= National Register of Historic Places listings in Santa Clara County, California =

Location of Santa Clara County in California

This is intended to be a complete list of the properties and districts on the National Register of Historic Places in Santa Clara County, California, United States. Latitude and longitude coordinates are provided for many National Register properties and districts; these locations may be seen together in an online map.

There are 120 properties and districts listed on the National Register in the county, including 6 National Historic Landmarks. Another property was once listed but has been removed.

This National Park Service list is complete through NPS recent listings posted September 11, 2026.

== Current listings ==
	Name on the Register	Image	Date listed	Location	City or town	Description
1	Agnews Insane Asylum	Agnews Insane Asylum	August 13, 1997 (#97000829)	4000 Lafayette Ave. 37°23′38″N 121°57′10″W	Santa Clara	
2	John Colpitts Ainsley House No. 3	John Colpitts Ainsley House No. 3	October 3, 2005 (#05001086)	300 Grant St. 37°17′26″N 121°56′37″W	Campbell	
3	Clifford Allen House		July 29, 2024 (#100009748)	637 Alvarado Row; 37°25′16″N 122°09′51″W	Stanford	
4	Theophilus Allen House	Theophilus Allen House	May 20, 1999 (#99000580)	601 Melville Ave. 37°26′37″N 122°08′53″W	Palo Alto	
5	Alviso Historic District	Alviso Historic District	October 9, 1973 (#73000449)	Generally bounded by the Alviso Marina County Park, Guadalupe River/Alviso Slough, Moffat St. and El Dorado St. 37°25′30″N 121°58′00″W	Alviso	
6	Jose Maria Alviso Adobe	Jose Maria Alviso Adobe	October 7, 1997 (#97001190)	92 Piedmont Rd. 37°26′17″N 121°52′08″W	Milpitas	
7	Ames Administration Building		January 11, 2017 (#100000467)	Bush Cir., NASA Ames Research Center; 37°24′43″N 122°03′44″W	Moffett Field	
8	Arc Jet Complex		January 11, 2017 (#100000466)	980 Mark Ave., NASA Ames Research Center; 37°25′08″N 122°03′32″W	Moffett Field	
9	Ashworth-Remillard House	Ashworth-Remillard House	December 12, 1976 (#76000529)	755 Story Rd. 37°19′43″N 121°51′34″W	San Jose	
10	Building at 27–29 Fountain Alley	Building at 27–29 Fountain Alley	March 2, 1982 (#82002265)	27–29 Fountain Alley; 37°20′10″N 121°53′23″W	San Jose	
11	Campbell Union Grammar School	Campbell Union Grammar School	July 20, 1979 (#79000544)	11 E. Campbell Ave. 37°17′16″N 121°56′52″W	Campbell	
12	Campbell Union High School Historic District	Campbell Union High School Historic District	August 17, 1989 (#89001048)	1 W. Campbell Ave. 37°17′13″N 121°57′14″W	Campbell	
13	Christian Church of Gilroy	Christian Church of Gilroy	April 1, 1982 (#82002261)	160 5th St. 37°00′28″N 121°34′14″W	Gilroy	
14	Civic Art Gallery	Civic Art Gallery	January 29, 1973 (#73000453)	110 Market St. 37°20′01″N 121°53′21″W	San Jose	
15	Coyote Creek Archeological District		October 14, 1971 (#71000192)	Address Restricted	Gilroy Hot Springs	
16	De Anza Hotel	De Anza Hotel	January 21, 1982 (#82002266)	233 W. Santa Clara St. 37°20′04″N 121°53′38″W	San Jose	
17	Pedro de Lemos House	Pedro de Lemos House	January 10, 1980 (#80000863)	100–110 Waverley Oaks; 37°26′01″N 122°08′24″W	Palo Alto	
18	Dohrmann Building	Dohrmann Building	February 20, 1986 (#86000264)	325 S. First St. 37°19′52″N 121°53′09″W	San Jose	
19	T. B. Downing House	T. B. Downing House	October 30, 1973 (#73000452)	706 Cowper St. 37°26′48″N 122°09′24″W	Palo Alto	
20	Dunker House	Dunker House	February 19, 1982 (#82002264)	420 Maple St. 37°27′25″N 122°08′59″W	Palo Alto	
21	East San Jose Carnegie Library	East San Jose Carnegie Library	December 10, 1990 (#90001813)	1102 E. Santa Clara St. 37°20′49″N 121°52′03″W	San Jose	
22	Fairglen Additions (Unit 1, Unit 2, and Unit 3)	Fairglen Additions (Unit 1, Unit 2, and Unit 3)	June 6, 2019 (#100004036)	Booksin, Fairvalley, Fairhill, Fairwood, Fairlawn, Fairorchard, Fairdell, and Andalusia Aves., Fairlawn, Fairvalley, Fairoak, and Fairgrove Courts, and Fairglen Dr. 37°16′53″N 121°54′12″W	San Jose	
23	First Unitarian Universalist Church	First Unitarian Universalist Church	November 17, 1977 (#77000343)	160 N. 3rd St. 37°20′23″N 121°53′20″W	San Jose	
24	Flight And Guidance Simulation Laboratory		January 11, 2017 (#100000469)	655 Cooper Ln., NASA Ames Research Center; 37°24′55″N 122°03′24″W	Moffett Field	
25	Forbes Mill Annex	Forbes Mill Annex	July 31, 1978 (#78000776)	75 Church St. 37°13′20″N 121°58′50″W	Los Gatos	
26	Fraternal Hall Building	Fraternal Hall Building	February 15, 1990 (#90000119)	140 University Ave. and 514 High St. 37°26′40″N 122°09′45″W	Palo Alto	
27	Arthur Monroe Free House	Arthur Monroe Free House	April 26, 2002 (#02000384)	66 S. 14th St. 37°20′32″N 121°52′31″W	San Jose	
28	Galindo-Leigh House	Galindo-Leigh House	August 22, 1980 (#80000857)	140 S. Peter Dr. 37°17′06″N 121°55′21″W	Campbell	
29	Gilroy Free Library	Gilroy Free Library	June 23, 1988 (#88000923)	195 Fifth St. 37°00′29″N 121°34′18″W	Gilroy	
30	Gilroy Southern Pacific Railroad Depot	Gilroy Southern Pacific Railroad Depot	July 12, 2019 (#100004192)	7250 Monterey St. 37°00′16″N 121°34′01″W	Gilroy	
31	Gilroy Yamato Hot Springs		August 21, 1995 (#95000996)	9.5 miles (15.3 km) northeast of the junction of New Ave. and Roop Rd. 37°06′30″N 121°28′39″W	Gilroy	
32	Green Gables	Green Gables	July 28, 2005 (#04000863)	Channing Ave., Ivy Ln., Greer Rd., Wildwood Ln. 37°26′45″N 122°07′27″W	Palo Alto	community of Eichler homes
33	Greenmeadow	Greenmeadow	July 28, 2005 (#04000862)	Nelson Dr., El Capitan Pl., Adobe Pl., Creekside Dr. 37°24′53″N 122°06′45″W	Palo Alto	community of Eichler homes
34	Willard Griffin House and Carriage House	Willard Griffin House and Carriage House	April 13, 1977 (#77000342)	12345 S. El Monte Ave. 37°21′43″N 122°07′30″W	Los Altos	
35	Hakone Historic District	Hakone Historic District	April 23, 2013 (#13000181)	21000 Big Basin Way; 37°15′15″N 122°02′22″W	Saratoga	
36	Capt. James A. Hamilton House	Capt. James A. Hamilton House	June 9, 1980 (#80000864)	2295 S. Bascom Ave. 37°16′54″N 121°55′52″W	San Jose	
37	Hanna-Honeycomb House	Hanna-Honeycomb House	November 7, 1978 (#78000780)	737 Frenchman's Rd. 37°25′00″N 122°09′45″W	Stanford	1937 house by Frank Lloyd Wright
38	Hayes Mansion	Hayes Mansion	August 1, 1975 (#75000481)	200 Edenvale Ave. 37°15′45″N 121°49′11″W	San Jose	
39	Hensley Historic District	Hensley Historic District	June 21, 1983 (#83001238)	Roughly bounded by Julian, 1st, 7th, and Empire Sts. 37°20′40″N 121°53′29″W	San Jose	
40	Hewlett-Packard House and Garage	Hewlett-Packard House and Garage	April 20, 2007 (#07000307)	367 Addison Ave. 37°26′35″N 122°09′17″W	Palo Alto	
41	Highway 152 Tree Row	Highway 152 Tree Row	July 3, 2007 (#07000635)	California State Route 152 between Uvas Creek Bridge and Santa Teresa Blvd; 37°00′43″N 121°36′47″W	Gilroy	
42	Edgar Holloway House	Edgar Holloway House	January 28, 1982 (#82002262)	7539 Eigleberry St. 37°00′31″N 121°34′16″W	Gilroy	
43	Lou Henry Hoover House	Lou Henry Hoover House	January 30, 1978 (#78000786)	623 Mirada Rd. 37°25′05″N 122°10′04″W	Stanford	
44	Hostess House	Hostess House	July 30, 1976 (#76000528)	University Ave. at El Camino Real; 37°26′35″N 122°09′56″W	Palo Alto	Originally a YWCA building; now the MacArthur Park Restaurant
45	Hotel Montgomery	Hotel Montgomery	April 20, 2006 (#06000328)	211 SW First St. 37°19′57″N 121°53′15″W	San Jose	
46	Hotel Sainte Claire	Hotel Sainte Claire	June 3, 1980 (#80000865)	302 and 320 S. Market St. 37°20′13″N 121°52′58″W	San Jose	
47	Warner Hutton House	Warner Hutton House	March 17, 2006 (#06000189)	13777a Fruitvale Ave. 37°16′05″N 122°00′52″W	Saratoga	
48	Kee House	Kee House	April 11, 1985 (#85000715)	2310 Yale St. 37°25′28″N 122°08′51″W	Palo Alto	1889 Eastlake-style house
49	Kotani-En Garden	Kotani-En Garden	November 7, 1976 (#76000527)	15891 Ravine Road; 37°14′14″N 122°00′41″W	Los Gatos	
50	Andrew J. Landrum House	Andrew J. Landrum House	February 19, 1982 (#82002271)	1219 Santa Clara St. 37°20′50″N 121°56′52″W	Santa Clara	
51	Lantarnam Hall		December 19, 1985 (#85003189)	12335 Stonebrook Ct. 37°21′24″N 122°07′31″W	Los Altos Hills	
52	Le Petit Trianon	Le Petit Trianon	November 15, 1972 (#72001552)	De Anza College campus 37°19′15″N 122°02′50″W	Cupertino	
53	Leib Carriage House	Leib Carriage House	June 2, 1980 (#80000866)	60 N. Keeble Ave. 37°19′59″N 121°54′29″W	San Jose	
54	James Lick Mill	James Lick Mill	March 2, 1982 (#82002272)	305 Montague Expwy. 37°23′59″N 121°56′30″W	Santa Clara	
55	Live Oak Creamery	Live Oak Creamery	March 11, 1982 (#82002263)	88 Martin St. 37°00′30″N 121°34′05″W	Gilroy	
56	Los Gatos Historic Commercial District	Los Gatos Historic Commercial District	September 13, 1991 (#91001382)	1–24 N. Santa Cruz Ave., 9–15 University Ave. and 14–198 W. Main St. 37°13′19″N 121°58′58″W	Los Gatos	
57	MacFarland House	MacFarland House	July 21, 2006 (#06000659)	775 Santa Ynez St. 37°25′01″N 122°10′07″W	Stanford	
58	Malaguerra Winery	Malaguerra Winery	October 23, 1980 (#80000858)	N. of Morgan Hill on Burnett Ave. 37°10′09″N 121°39′19″W	Madrone; Morgan Hill	
59	Paul Masson Mountain Winery	Paul Masson Mountain Winery	June 9, 1983 (#83001239)	Pierce Rd. 37°15′37″N 122°03′53″W	Saratoga	
60	McCullagh–Jones House	McCullagh–Jones House	October 29, 1974 (#74000558)	18000 Overlook Rd. 37°13′37″N 121°59′37″W	Los Gatos	
61	Messina Orchard	Messina Orchard	April 9, 2018 (#100002288)	721–781 N. Capitol Ave. 37°22′40″N 121°51′03″W	San Jose	
62	Miller Red Barn	Miller Red Barn	September 26, 2016 (#16000665)	7049 Miller Ave. 36°59′54″N 121°35′18″W	Gilroy	
63	Miller-Melone Ranch	Miller-Melone Ranch	April 1, 1993 (#93000260)	12795 Saratoga-Sunnyvale Rd. 37°16′57″N 122°01′58″W	Saratoga	
64	Milpitas Grammar School	Milpitas Grammar School	July 22, 1993 (#93000667)	160 N. Main St. 37°25′59″N 121°54′21″W	Milpitas	
65	Moir Building	Moir Building	October 29, 1982 (#82000991)	227–247 N. 1st St. 37°20′23″N 121°53′32″W	San Jose	
66	Charles Copeland Morse House	Charles Copeland Morse House	April 13, 1977 (#77000347)	981 Fremont St. 37°21′08″N 121°56′41″W	Santa Clara	
67	Mountain View Adobe	Mountain View Adobe	October 28, 2002 (#02001256)	157 Moffett Blvd. 37°23′45″N 122°04′37″W	Mountain View	
68	NASA Ames Wind Tunnel Historic District	NASA Ames Wind Tunnel Historic District	January 11, 2017 (#100000470)	NASA Ames Research Center; 37°24′55″N 122°03′46″W	Moffett Field	
69	New Almaden	New Almaden	October 15, 1966 (#66000236)	14 miles (23 km) south of San Jose on CR G8; 37°10′48″N 121°50′08″W	San Jose	
70	Norris House	Norris House	July 24, 1980 (#80000859)	1247 Cowper St. 37°26′33″N 122°08′57″W	Palo Alto	
71	Frank Norris Cabin	Frank Norris Cabin	October 15, 1966 (#66000235)	10 miles (16 km) west of Gilroy off CA 152; 37°02′11″N 121°42′45″W	Gilroy	
72	Old City Hall	Old City Hall	April 16, 1975 (#75000480)	7410 Monterey St. 37°00′26″N 121°34′07″W	Gilroy	
73	Our Lady of Guadalupe Mission Chapel (1953-1960)	Our Lady of Guadalupe Mission Chapel (1953-1960)	December 23, 2016 (#100000836)	2020 East San Antonio St. 37°21′09″N 121°50′41″W	San Jose	
74	Palo Alto Medical Clinic	Palo Alto Medical Clinic	June 21, 2010 (#10000357)	300 Homer Ave. 37°26′37″N 122°09′26″W	Palo Alto	also known as the Roth Building, and features 1932 murals by Victor Arnautoff.
75	Palo Alto Southern Pacific Railroad Depot	Palo Alto Southern Pacific Railroad Depot	April 18, 1996 (#96000425)	95 University Ave. 37°26′37″N 122°09′55″W	Palo Alto	
76	Palo Alto Stock Farm Horse Barn	Palo Alto Stock Farm Horse Barn	December 12, 1985 (#85003325)	Fremont Rd. 37°25′29″N 122°11′00″W	Stanford	
77	Luis Maria Peralta Adobe	Luis Maria Peralta Adobe	October 15, 1973 (#73000454)	184 W. St. John St. 37°20′11″N 121°53′36″W	San Jose	
78	Pettigrew House	Pettigrew House	November 25, 1980 (#80000860)	1336 Cowpers St. 37°26′29″N 122°08′55″W	Palo Alto	
79	Picchetti Brothers Winery	Picchetti Brothers Winery	May 10, 1979 (#79000545)	Southwest of Cupertino at 13100 Montebello Rd. 37°17′40″N 122°05′26″W	Cupertino	
80	Pomeroy Green	Pomeroy Green	March 24, 2021 (#100006330)	1087-1151 Pomeroy Ave. and 3201-3289 Benton St. 37°20′44″N 121°59′15″W	Santa Clara	
81	Poverty Flat Site		February 23, 1972 (#72000254)	Address Restricted	Morgan Hill	
82	Professorville Historic District	Professorville Historic District	October 3, 1980 (#80000861)	Roughly bounded by Embarcadero Rd., Addison Ave., Emerson and Cowper Sts. 37°26′29″N 122°09′05″W	Palo Alto	
83	Ramona Street Architectural District	Ramona Street Architectural District	March 27, 1986 (#86000592)	518–581 Ramona St. and 255–267 Hamilton Ave. 37°26′42″N 122°09′42″W	Palo Alto	
84	Henry A. Rengstorff House	Henry A. Rengstorff House	June 13, 1978 (#78000778)	3070 N. Shoreline Blvd. 37°25′54″N 122°05′13″W	Mountain View	
85	Ernest & Emily Renzel House	Ernest & Emily Renzel House	September 23, 2010 (#10000773)	120 Arroyo Way; 37°20′32″N 121°52′18″W	San Jose	
86	Rhoades Ranch	Rhoades Ranch	April 17, 2013 (#13000158)	2290-A Cochrane Road; 37°09′51″N 121°37′54″W	Morgan Hill	
87	Roberto-Suñol Adobe	Roberto-Suñol Adobe	March 17, 1977 (#77000344)	770 Lincoln Ave. 37°18′59″N 121°54′22″W	San Jose	
88	Roma Bakery	Roma Bakery	January 21, 1982 (#82002267)	655 Almaden Ave. 37°20′33″N 121°53′07″W	San Jose	
89	Ross House	Ross House	October 29, 1982 (#82000992)	693 S. 2nd St. 37°19′35″N 121°52′51″W	San Jose	
90	St. James Square Historic District	St. James Square Historic District	November 27, 1979 (#79000546)	Roughly bounded by N. 1st, N. 4th, E. St. James, and E. St. John Sts. 37°20′20″N 121°53′25″W	San Jose	
91	St. Joseph's Roman Catholic Church	St. Joseph's Roman Catholic Church	August 26, 1977 (#77000345)	Market and San Fernando Sts. 37°20′03″N 121°53′22″W	San Jose	
92	San Jose Central Fire Station	San Jose Central Fire Station	January 7, 2015 (#14001113)	201 N. Market St. 37°20′19″N 121°53′40″W	San Jose	
93	San Jose Downtown Historic District	San Jose Downtown Historic District	May 26, 1983 (#83003822)	E. Santa Clara, South First, Second, Third and E. San Fernando Sts. 37°20′10″N 121°53′15″W	San Jose	
94	Santa Clara Depot	Santa Clara Depot	February 28, 1985 (#85000359)	1 Railroad Ave. 37°21′11″N 121°56′06″W	Santa Clara	
95	Santa Clara Verein	Santa Clara Verein	January 19, 1984 (#84001199)	1082 Alviso St. 37°21′05″N 121°56′29″W	Santa Clara	Demolished in 1991
96	Saratoga Foothill Club	Saratoga Foothill Club	February 27, 2005 (#05000069)	20399 Park Place; 37°15′33″N 122°01′48″W	Saratoga	1915 Arts and Crafts-style clubhouse designed by Julia Morgan
97	Saratoga Village Library	Saratoga Village Library	January 17, 2007 (#06001238)	14410 Oak St. 37°15′28″N 122°01′53″W	Saratoga	now a used book store benefiting the Saratoga Library
98	Paul Shoup House	Paul Shoup House	September 23, 2011 (#11000696)	500 University Ave. 37°22′25″N 122°07′07″W	Los Altos	
99	Southern Pacific Depot	Southern Pacific Depot	April 1, 1993 (#93000274)	65 Cahill St. 37°19′49″N 121°54′06″W	San Jose	
100	Spillman Engineering 3-Abreast Carousel		April 13, 2000 (#00000366)	139 B Eastridge Mall; 37°19′33″N 121°48′47″W	San Jose	Carousel made c. 1920 by Allan Herschell Company, restored and located in the Eastridge Mall.
101	John Adam Squire House	John Adam Squire House	March 6, 1972 (#72000255)	900 University Ave. 37°27′11″N 122°09′14″W	Palo Alto	
102	John Steinbeck House		December 28, 1989 (#89002117)	16250 Greenwood Ln. 37°13′55″N 122°00′07″W	Monte Sereno	
103	Troy Laundry	Troy Laundry	January 28, 1982 (#82002268)	722 Almaden Ave. 37°19′26″N 121°53′04″W	San Jose	no longer exists; Troy Apartments now occupy this location
104	Twohy Building	Twohy Building	October 6, 2003 (#03000989)	210 S. First St. 37°19′59″N 121°53′12″W	San Jose	
105	U.S. Post Office	U.S. Post Office	April 5, 1981 (#81000175)	380 Hamilton Ave. 37°26′45″N 122°09′33″W	Palo Alto	
106	Unitary Plan Wind Tunnel	Unitary Plan Wind Tunnel	October 3, 1985 (#85002799)	Ames Research Center; 37°25′03″N 122°03′35″W	Moffett Field	
107	US Naval Air Station Sunnyvale, California, Historic District	US Naval Air Station Sunnyvale, California, Historic District	February 24, 1994 (#94000045)	Moffett Federal Airfield; 37°24′46″N 122°03′13″W	Sunnyvale	NASA Ames Historic Properties
108	Veterans Affairs (VA) Hospital Site		October 21, 2019 (#100004526)	Address Restricted	Palo Alto	
109	Villa Mira Monte	Villa Mira Monte	May 25, 1978 (#78000777)	17860 Monterey Rd. 37°08′05″N 121°39′26″W	Morgan Hill	
110	Villa Montalvo	Villa Montalvo	May 1, 1978 (#78000784)	14800 Montalvo Rd. 37°14′38″N 122°01′52″W	Saratoga	
111	We and Our Neighbors Clubhouse	We and Our Neighbors Clubhouse	December 20, 1978 (#78000781)	South of San Jose at 15460 Union Ave. 37°14′37″N 121°55′52″W	San Jose	
112	Welch-Hurst	Welch-Hurst	September 18, 1978 (#78000785)	15800 Sanborn Rd. 37°14′22″N 122°04′22″W	Saratoga	most recently known as the Sanborn Park Hostel; closed in March 2010
113	Wheeler Hospital	Wheeler Hospital	September 13, 1990 (#90001442)	650 Fifth St. 37°00′23″N 121°34′38″W	Gilroy	
114	Wilson House	Wilson House	January 2, 1980 (#80000862)	860 University St. 37°27′09″N 122°09′16″W	Palo Alto	
115	Winchester House	Winchester House	August 7, 1974 (#74000559)	525 S. Winchester Blvd. 37°19′05″N 121°57′00″W	San Jose	Also known as Winchester Mystery House
116	Woman's Club of Palo Alto	Woman's Club of Palo Alto	January 7, 2015 (#14001114)	475 Homer Ave. 37°26′45″N 122°09′20″W	Palo Alto	
117	Woodhills	Woodhills	December 20, 1978 (#78000773)	South of Cupertino on Prospect Rd. 37°17′12″N 122°03′35″W	Cupertino	Also known as Fremont Older House
118	Earl and Virginia Young House	Earl and Virginia Young House	January 8, 2009 (#08001279)	1888 White Oaks Road; 37°15′39″N 121°56′55″W	Campbell	
119	Yung See San Fong House	Yung See San Fong House	September 8, 1983 (#83001240)	16660 Cypress Way; 37°12′58″N 121°57′36″W	Los Gatos	
120	Theodore Zschokke Cottages		May 26, 2020 (#100005218)	617 and 621 High St. 37°26′35″N 122°09′42″W	Palo Alto	

== Former listings ==
	Name on the Register	Image	Date listed	Date removed	Location	City or town	Description
1	Donner-Houghton House	Donner-Houghton House	January 24, 2002 (#01001483)	July 17, 2013	156 E. St. John; 37°20′26″N 121°53′19″W	San Jose	Destroyed by fire July 19, 2007
2	Murphy Building		April 28, 1975 (#75002133)	1976	36 S. Market St.	San Jose	Built by Martin Murphy Jr. in 1862, and demolished January 12, 1976.

== See also ==
- List of National Historic Landmarks in California
- National Register of Historic Places listings in California
- California Historical Landmarks in Santa Clara County, California
