= Alfred W. Smith =

American architect

Alfred William Smith
- Born: 1864; Louisiana, U.S.
- Died: 1933 (aged 68–69); Berkeley, California, U.S.
- Education: Oakland High School
- Occupation: Architect
- Spouse: Lilias Smith
- Children: 2 daughters

Alfred W. Smith (1864 – 1933) was an American architect. He designed many commercial and residential buildings as well as churches in the Bay Area of California. For example, he designed the San Francisco Korean Methodist Church in 1930, the Theophilus Allen House in Palo Alto (which is listed on the National Register of Historic Places), and several fraternity houses near the campus of the University of California, Berkeley.
