= Messina Orchard =

Historic Orchard in California

- U.S. National Register of Historic Places
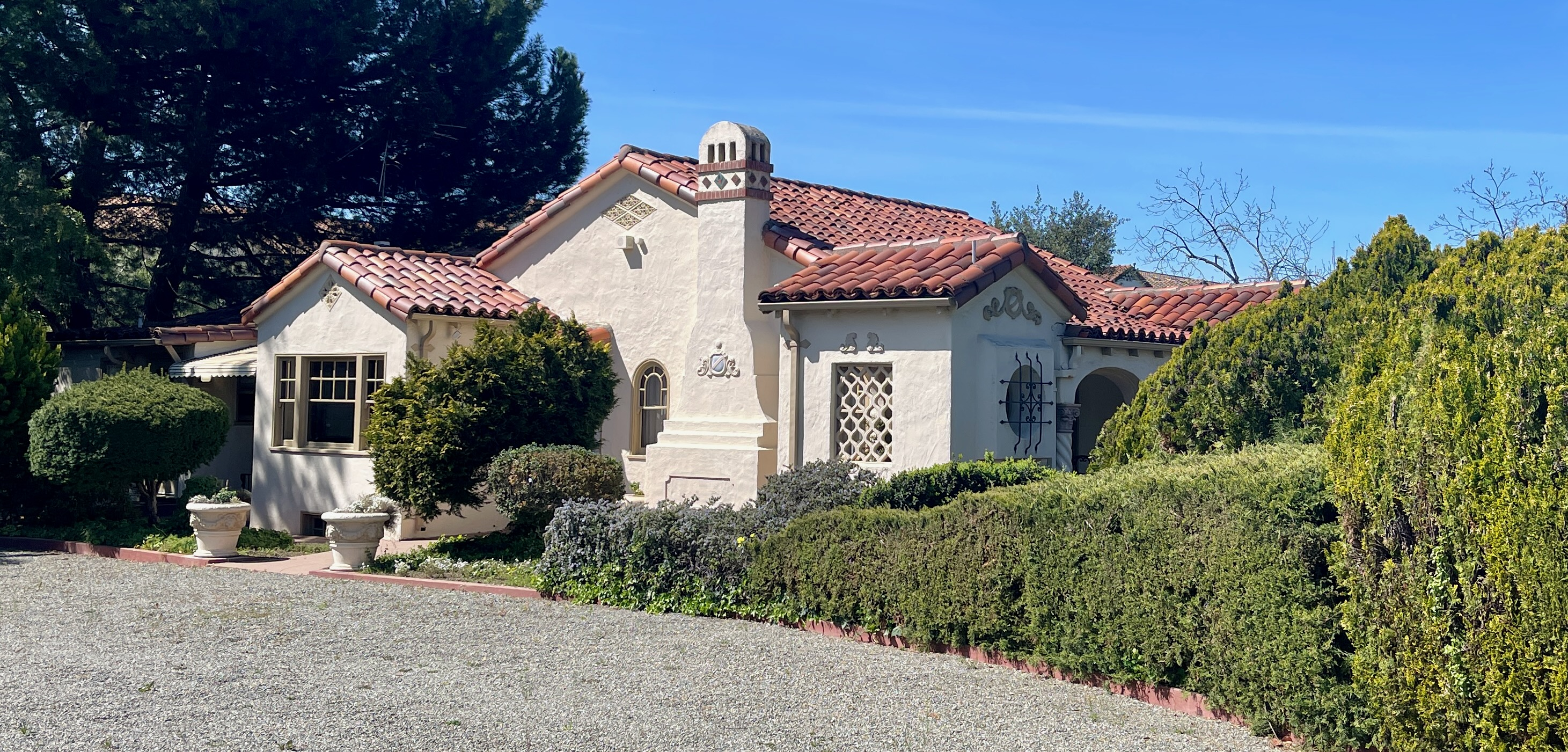
- Stefano and Marie Messina house

- Location within San Jose, California
- Location: 721–781 N. Capitol Avenue, San Jose, California, US
- Coordinates: 37°22′40″N 121°51′03″W
- Area: 4.96 acres (2.01 ha)
- Built: 1935; 91 years ago; 1949; 77 years ago
- Built by: Vincent Joseph (V.J.) Sunzeri
- Architect: Vincent Joseph (V.J.) Sunzeri
- Architectural style: Spanish Revival; Mediterranean Revival
- NRHP reference No.: 100002288
- Added to NRHP: April 9, 2018

The Messina Orchard is a historic orchard, located in San Jose, California, US. The 4.96 acres (2.01 ha) tract of land has two residences associated with the Messina family. It holds significance in the realm of agriculture for its connection to the agricultural growth of the Santa Clara Valley, as well as for its architectural value due to the presence of two period-revival family homes. The Messina Orchard was officially recognized and listed on the National Register of Historic Places on April 9, 2018.

== History ==
Stefano and Marie Messina migrated from Sicily in 1905 as youngsters and established themselves in the Santa Clara Valley. Upon their marriage in 1922, they acquired 40 acres (16 ha) of orchard land, including what is now known as Messina Orchard, which was previously owned by Floyd Lundy, a horticulturist from the vicinity. They cultivated apricots, prunes, and peaches on the premises.

The Messina Orchard was later reduced to 4.96 acres (2.01 ha). The property is a rectangular plot situated southeast of the junction of North Capitol Avenue and Mabury Road in San Jose, California. Within this parcel lie five structures. The Stefano and Marie Messina house, built in 1935, is a Spanish Revival-style home with a matching garage. This house replaced the original Lundy Victorian-style house. In 1949, a second house was built by Messina's son, Richard and his wife Anita, incorporating Mediterranean Revival architecture.

Additionally, there are two equipment sheds and a water tank built in 1925, and numerous orchard trees spread across an open area. The landscape surrounding the 1935 residence has extensive and formal plantings, including a circular walkway, fountain, and palm trees arranged in pairs to the east. The 1949 house is also enhanced by structured landscaping and a brick wall positioned at the northeast border of the premises. All structures and areas within the orchard's boundaries date back to the significant period of operation spanning from 1925 to 1960. The Messina Gardens Park is adjacent to the property on Messina Gardens Lane. The Messina Orchard had a workforce of 25 individuals involved in fruit cultivation and processing.

== Design ==
The Stefano and Marie Messina residence, built in 1935, was designed by an unidentified architect. The garden and lawn were designed by landscape architect George Martin from Los Gatos. The house is a one-story, wooden-framed dwelling supported by a concrete foundation along its perimeter. Its layout is irregular, featuring a cross-gable roof with Spanish clay tiles. A hipped roof covers the rear portion, designated for the sleeping quarters. External walls are adorned in stucco, with tile on the chimney and gable ends. The windows include arched, multi-light wooden sash windows, six-over-one double-hung wooden sash windows, and multi-light wooden casement windows.

Architect Vincent Joseph (V.J.) Sunzeri designed and built the Richard and Anita Messina house in 1949. A brick landscaping wall spans the north and east boundaries, linking the two driveway entrances, each with a brick entrance. The home is a two-story structure with an irregular floor plan, with wooden-framed walls supported by a concrete foundation around its perimeter. The roof design is intricate, incorporating both hipped and shed roofs topped with clay-barrel tiles. Exterior walls are coated with flat stucco, and the roof eaves display exposed rafters. The house contains the original multi-pane windows. The interior remains largely intact and has stepped archways to define spaces, wooden flooring, a wrought-iron staircase, and a brick fireplace in the living room, Mid-Century Modern-style metal windows, and a family room featuring metal ceiling beams and curved frosted glass.

== Historical status ==
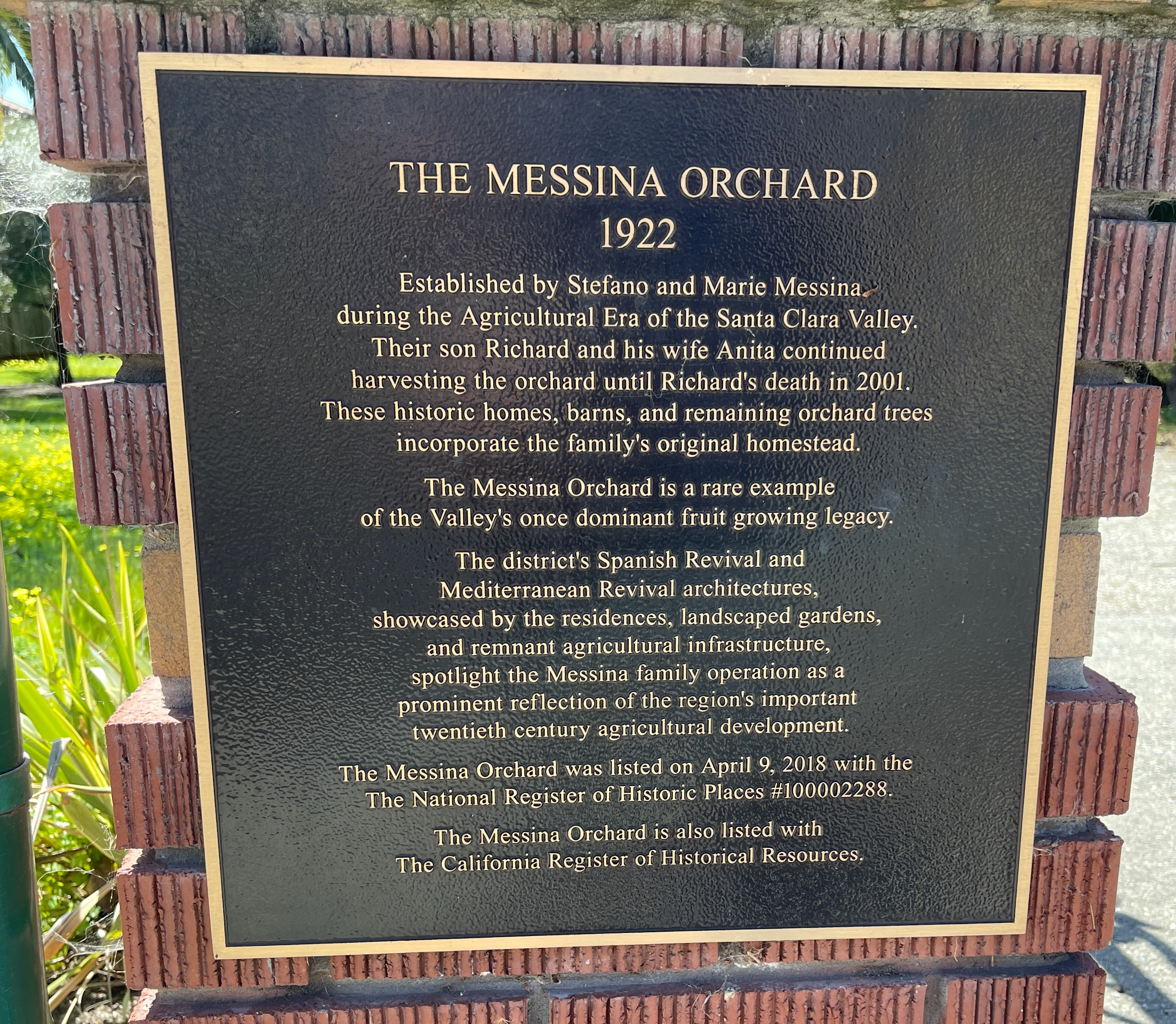
The Messina Orchard Plaque (1922)

The Messina Orchard was nominated to the National Register of Historic Places on February 8, 2013. and registered on April 9, 2018.

The Messina Orchard is historically significant in agriculture due to its connection to the agricultural advancement of the Santa Clara Valley. The Orchard played a role in the extensive fruit production that led to the Santa Clara Valley being dubbed the "Valley of Heart's Delight." Additionally, Rhoades Ranch holds significance in architecture for its two well-preserved, period-revival single-family residences, alongside formal landscaping, existing farm structures, and orchard trees.

A plaque has been placed in front of the Stefano and Marie Messina house, which says:

"The Messina Orchard Plaque (1922). Established by Stefano and Marie Messina during the Agricultural Era of the Santa Clara Valley. Their son Richard and his wife Anita continued harvesting the orchard until Richard's death in 2001. These historic homes, barns, and remaining orchard trees incorporate the family's original homestead. This Messina Orchard is a rare example of the Valley's once dominant fruit growing legacy. The district's Spanish Revival and Mediterranean Revival architectures, showcased by the residences, landscaped gardens, and remnant agricultural infrastructure, spotlight the Messina family operation as a prominent reflection of the region's important twentieth century agricultural development. The Messina Orchard was listed on April 9, 2018 with The National Register of Historic Places #100002288. The Messina Orchard is also listed with the California Register of Historic Resources."

== See also ==
- National Register of Historic Places listings in Santa Clara County, California
