= Theophilus Allen House =

Historic house in California, United States

- U.S. National Register of Historic Places
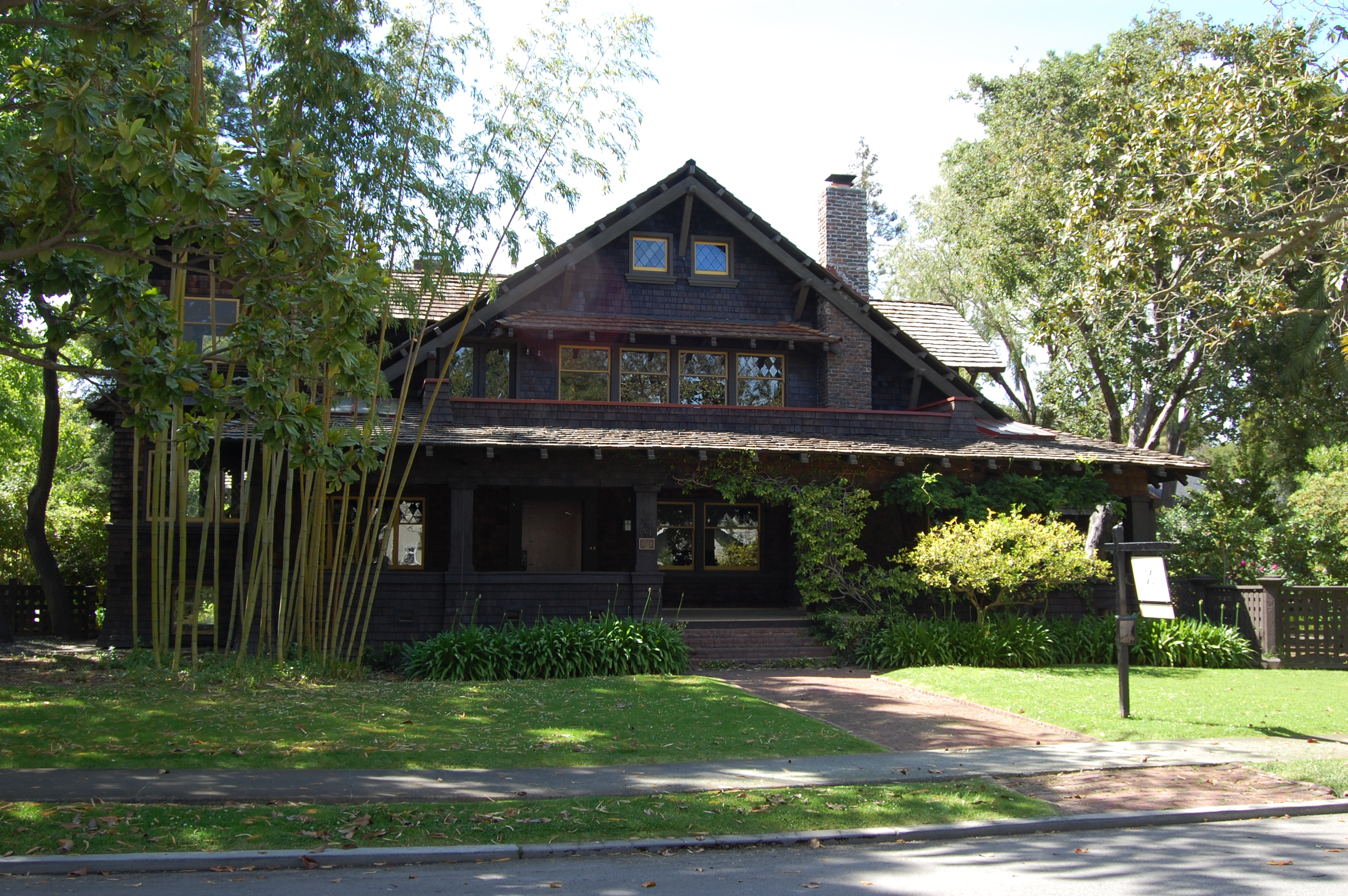
- The Theophilus Allen House in 2010

- Location within California Location within the United States
- Location: 601 Melville Avenue, Palo Alto, California
- Coordinates: 37°26′38″N 122°8′49″W
- Area: 0.5 acres (0.20 ha)
- Built: 1905
- Architect: Alfred W. Smith; Gustav Laumeist
- Architectural style: Bungalow/American Craftsman
- NRHP reference No.: 99000580
- Added to NRHP: May 20, 1999

The Theophilus Allen House is a historic house in Palo Alto, California, U.S.. It was built in 1905 for Theophilus Allen, the founder of the Palo Alto Christian Science Church. It was designed in the American Craftsman style by architect Alfred W. Smith. It has been listed on the National Register of Historic Places since May 20, 1999.
