= Warner Hutton House =

Historic house in California, United States

- U.S. National Register of Historic Places
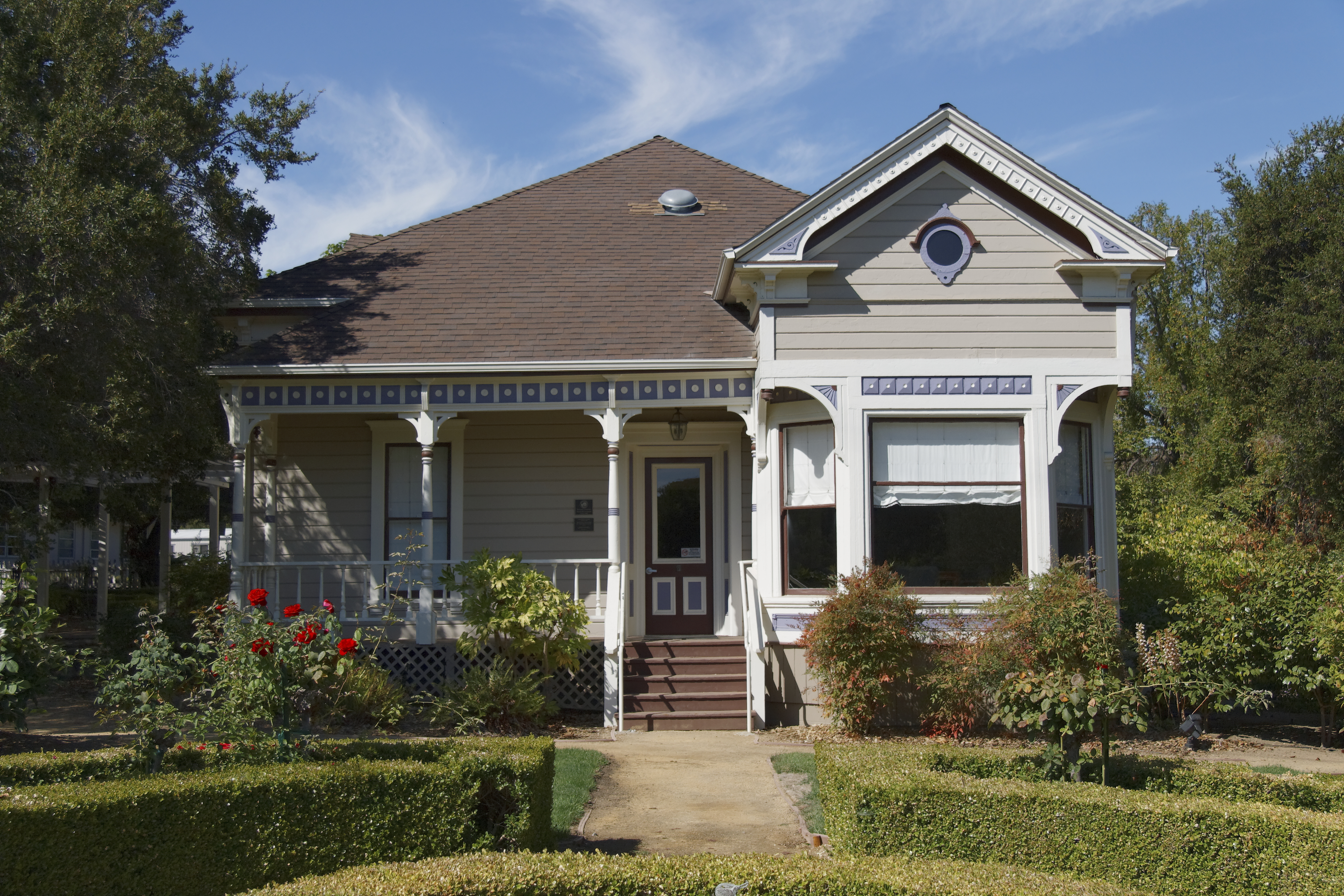
- The house in 2012

- Location within California
- Location: 13777a Fruitvale Avenue, Saratoga, California
- Coordinates: 37°16′06″N 122°00′43″W
- Area: less than one acre
- Built: 1896
- Architectural style: Queen Anne
- NRHP reference No.: 06000189
- Added to NRHP: March 17, 2006

The Warner Hutton House is a historic house in Saratoga, California. It was built in 1896 for Warner Hutton. Hutton was born in New York, and he inherited landholdings from his father, a fruit farmer. The house was acquired by the city of Saratoga in 1987.

The house was designed in the Queen Anne architectural style. It has been listed on the National Register of Historic Places since March 17, 2006.
