= Villa Mira Monte =

Historic house in California, United States

- U.S. National Register of Historic Places
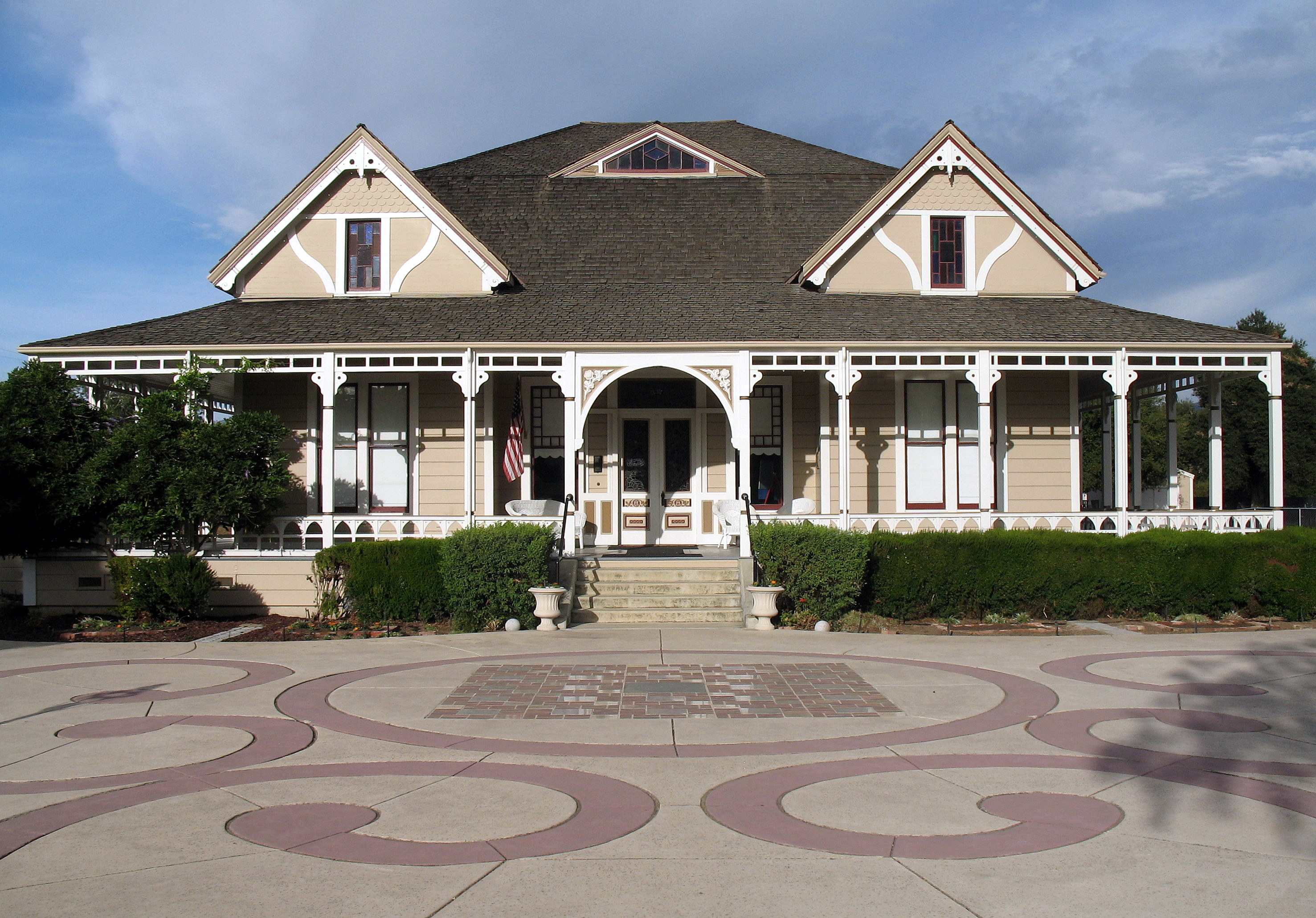
- Villa Mira Monte in 2012

- Location within California
- Location: 17860 Monterey Road, Morgan Hill, California
- Coordinates: 37°08′04″N 121°39′22″W
- Area: 1.4 acres (0.57 ha)
- Built: 1886
- Architectural style: Stick/eastlake, Victorian Stick
- NRHP reference No.: 78000777
- Added to NRHP: May 25, 1978

Villa Mira Monte is a historic villa in Morgan Hill, California, United States, which is listed on the National Register of Historic Places. It was built for Hiram Morgan Hill, founder of Morgan Hill, and his wife Diana Helen Murphy Hill, a Californio heiress.

== History ==
The Hiram Morgan Hill house was built in 1886 for Morgan Hill and his wife, Diana Helen Murphy (the daughter of Daniel Martin Murphy). The site also includes the Morgan Hill Museum, a farmhouse built in 1911 by John Acton.

Hill was from Missouri; his wife Diana was an heiress. The house was built on land inherited by Diana from her father, Daniel Murphy. Her Irish-born grandfather had emigrated to Canada penniless and acquired land grants in Alta California when it was a federal territory of the First Mexican Republic.

With the Hill couple separated, Hiram became a cattle rancher in Nevada, and Diana became a socialite in Washington, D.C. Their daughter, also named Diana, married Baron Hardouin Reinhach-Werth in 1911 and died by suicide in 1912. The father died in 1913. The mother emigrated to England and married Sir George Rhodes. She became known as Lady Diana Helen Murphy Hill Rhodes, and she died in Cannes in 1937. She was buried in the Santa Clara Cemetery with the rest of her family.

== Architecture ==
The house was designed in the Stick-Eastlake architectural style. It has been listed on the National Register of Historic Places since May 25, 1978.
