= Wheeler Hospital =

Historic hospital in Gilroy, California, United States

- U.S. National Register of Historic Places
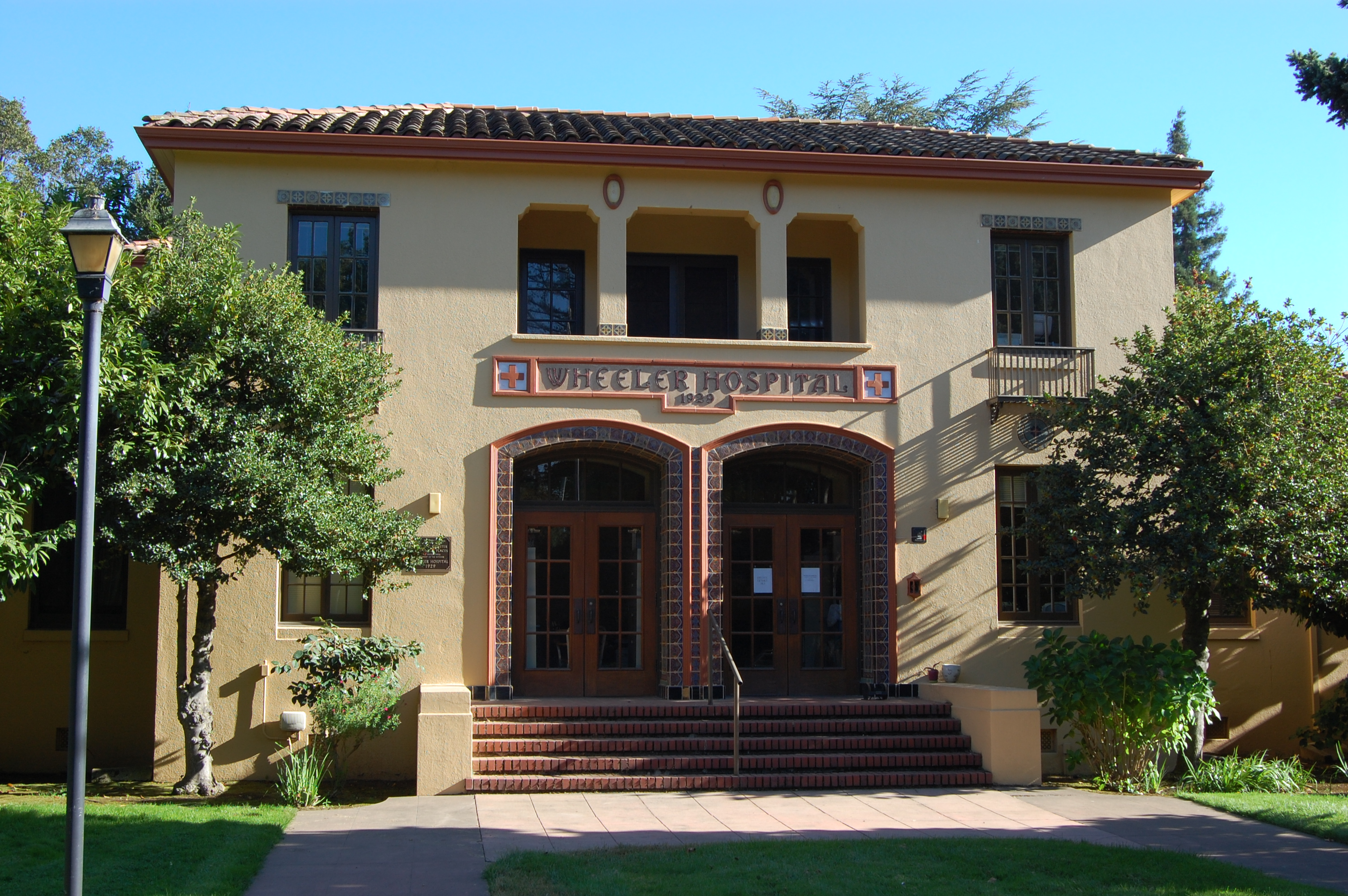
- Wheeler Hospital

- Location within California
- Location: 650 Fifth Street, Gilroy, California, US
- Coordinates: 37°0′23″N 121°34′38″W
- Area: 3.74 acres (1.51 ha)
- Built: 1929
- Built by: William Radtke
- Architect: William H. Weeks
- Architectural style: Mediterranean Revival architecture
- Website: edenhousing.org/properties/wheeler-manor/
- NRHP reference No.: 90001442
- Added to NRHP: September 13, 1990

The Wheeler Hospital was a historic hospital constructed in 1929, in Gilroy, California. The hospital was designed by California architect William Henry Weeks and funded by merchant Lin Walker Wheeler. The Wheeler Hospital was placed on the National Register of Historic Places on September 13, 1990. In 1990, the Wheeler Hospital merged with an elder care facility to establish the Wheeler Manor Senior Apartments.

== History ==
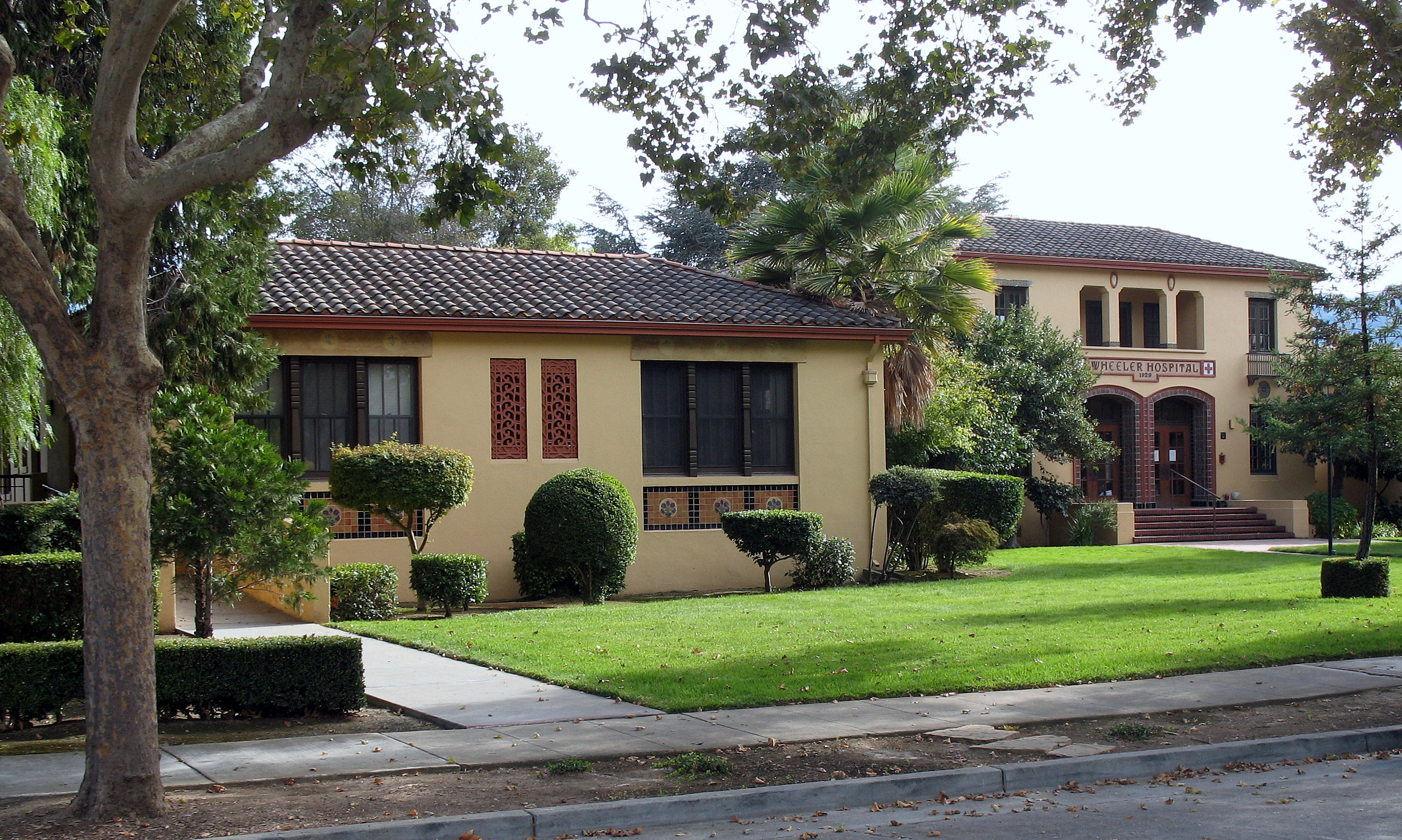
Wheeler Hospital, built in 1929 in a Mediterranean Revival style, 650 Fifth St., Gilroy.

Lin Walker Wheeler (1868–1944) provided $40,000 (equivalent to $750,000 in 2025) for the construction of a two-story hospital in the Mediterranean Revival style. The hospital opened its doors on July 27, 1929, initially accommodating 29 beds. The construction of the hospital was supervised by builder William Radtke.

During the economic challenges of the Great Depression, city-sponsored development initiatives continued to thrive throughout the latter part of the 1930s, through financial support from influential Gilroy families such as the Wheelers. In 1962, a new 50-bed wing was incorporated into the Wheeler Hospital, situated adjacent to the original 1929 structure and connected by a walkway. Every room and department within this new building featured a wall plaque denoting a memorial contribution from various sources, including individuals, families, businesses, employee groups, and clubs.

During the 1979 Coyote Lake earthquake, the Wheeler Hospital treated six cases of injuries related to the earthquake. In 1990, Wheeler Hospital merged with a nearby elder care facility to establish the Wheeler Manor Senior Apartments. In 1993, Wheeler Manor introduced a new senior housing complex called Building B. In 2018, a renovation project was undertaken to safeguard historical elements of the original hospital, which included the preservation of the original foundation and walls, the clay tile roof, double hung windows, arched entrance, and tile inlay.

== Design ==
The Wheeler Hospital was designed by California architect William H. Weeks (1864-1936) in 1928. It was done in the Mediterranean Revival (Spanish Eclectic) architectural style, which was a hallmark of Weeks' work in Gilroy between 1921 and 1934. The Wheeler Hospital was a 10,144 square feet (942.4 m^{2}) medical facility that occupied a 3.74 acres (1.51 ha) city block, sharing the space with a newer hospital completed in 1962. The Wheeler Hospital was designed in the shape of an "H." In each part of the structure, are low-pitched hipped tile roofs, covered with straight barrel mission-style terracotta tiles, arranged in a regular pattern. It was constructed from reinforced concrete and features, stucco siding, and decorative ceramic tile, and wrought iron elements on the front facade.

The hospital was equipped with 22 patient rooms, each having a toilet, with many also including full baths. Each patient station was furnished with a built-in radio equipped with earphones and a nurses call button, representing an innovative feature and making it the only hospital in the state with this equipment. The central section of the building consists of two stories, with a second-story recessed loggia situated above a double-arched, tiled entryway. It spans five structural units and features a second story above the central section. The building's concrete foundation includes a partial basement used to house the furnace and water heaters. The lower part of the central section encompassed the main entrance, offices, and a stairway to the second floor. The upper floor, spanning approximately 1,300 square feet (120 m^{2}), originally served as the nurses' quarters and featured five bedrooms, two fully tiled baths, and a sitting room with a balcony overlooking the main entrance. The wings of the building are single-story, and they include windows of various sizes, including single, double, and triple configurations with wooden mullions.

The building's exterior walls are primarily stucco, with ceramic tile embellishments located beneath the windows on the north side. The building's exterior remains largely unaltered, except for the plywood coverings added to the windows, doors, and transoms in 1989. Internally, some modifications have been made, including the removal of certain walls. The ground plan's east wing accommodated surgery suites, an emergency room, a dining area, and the primary kitchen. The west wing housed a maternity and nursery rooms, private patient rooms, and a visitors' room. Male and female surgical patients had their rooms on the east and west sides of the central two-story section. Inside, the walls were constructed using lath and plaster, with wainscoting extending up to three feet, except in the maternity and surgery areas, where the walls are entirely covered in ceramic tile. Additionally, all the wood used throughout the building is of high-quality full-dimension redwood or better.

In 1962, a new wing was added to the Wheeler Hospital, adjacent to the original 1929 structure. A roof designed in an awning-style provides shelter for a walkway extending from the rear center of the 1929 building to the 1962 building, which is situated on the south side of the block.

== Historical significance ==
The Wheeler Hospital was placed on the National Register of Historic Places on September 13, 1990. This hospital holds historical significance under California Register of Historical Resources criterion "C" within the field of Agriculture History as the work of local architect, William H. Weeks. The period of significance is in 1929 when the hospital was constructed to support Gilroy's needs for a community hospital.

== See also ==
- National Register of Historic Places listings in Santa Clara County, California
