= Poverty Flat Site =

Historic site in Morgan Hill, California, United States

- U.S. National Register of Historic Places
- Location within California
- Location: Poverty Flat Road, Morgan Hill, California
- Coordinates: 37°11′00″N 121°30′03″W
- Area: 2,000 ft (610 m)
- Built: Prehistoric
- NRHP reference No.: 72000254
- Added to NRHP: February 23, 1972

Poverty Flat Site is a prehistoric village site in Morgan Hill, California, located in Henry W. Coe State Park. Poverty Flat Site was officially recognized and listed on the National Register of Historic Places on February 23, 1972.

== History ==
Poverty Flat features five designated sites. Sites 1 through 4 are located on the north bank of the Middle Fork Coyote Creek, while site 5 is situated on the southern bank.

The Poverty Flat Site area spans 300 300 ft (91 m) in length and 100 ft (30 m) feet in width, with depths ranging from 2 ft (0.61 m) to 5 ft (1.5 m). Comprising a significant deposit of dark gray ashy debris, it contains numerous fire-fractured rocks, human bone, as well as chips and flakes of obsidian mixed with chert. Situated near ample water sources and abundant food reserves at the canyon's base, it suggests the site served as a semi-permanent Costanoan Native American village.

== See also ==
- National Register of Historic Places listings in Santa Clara County, California
- Timeline of North American prehistory
