= Dohrmann Building =

- U.S. National Register of Historic Places
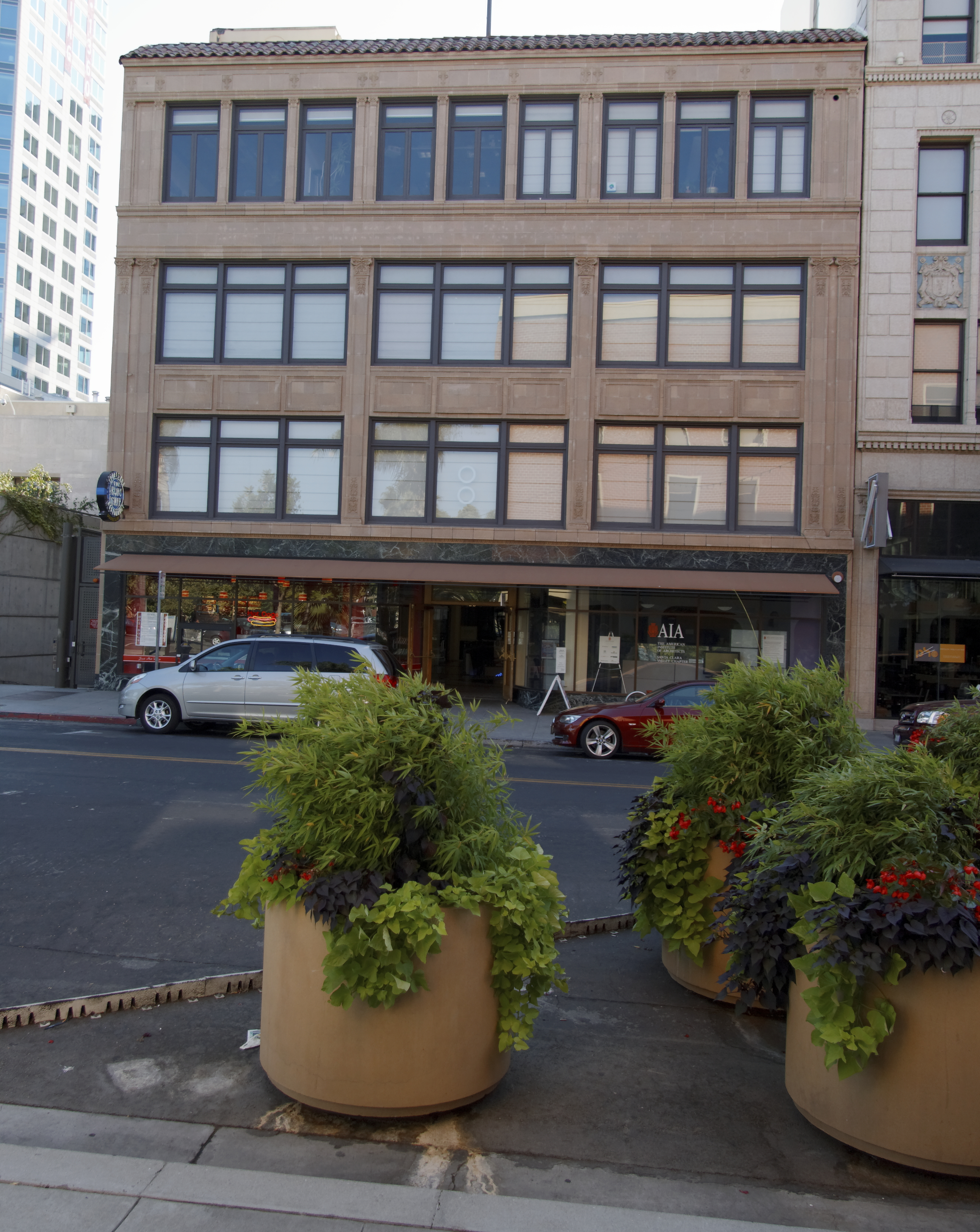
- The building in 2012

- Location within California
- Location: 325 South First Street, San Jose, California
- Coordinates: 37°19′52″N 121°53′09″W
- Area: 0.2 acres (0.081 ha)
- Built: 1926
- Architect: Ashley & Evers
- Architectural style: Classical Revival, Mission/spanish Revival
- NRHP reference No.: 86000264
- Added to NRHP: February 20, 1986

The Dohrmann Building, also known as the Dohrmann Hotel Supply Company Building, is a historic building in San Jose, California. It was built in 1926 for A.B.C. Dohrmann, a businessman from San Francisco. It was first used as an office building by the Dohrmann Hotel Supply Company in 1927.

The building was designed in the Classical Revival and Spanish Colonial Revival architectural styles. It has been listed on the National Register of Historic Places since February 20, 1986.
