= San Jose Central Fire Station =

Historic Fire Station in California, United States

- U.S. National Register of Historic Places
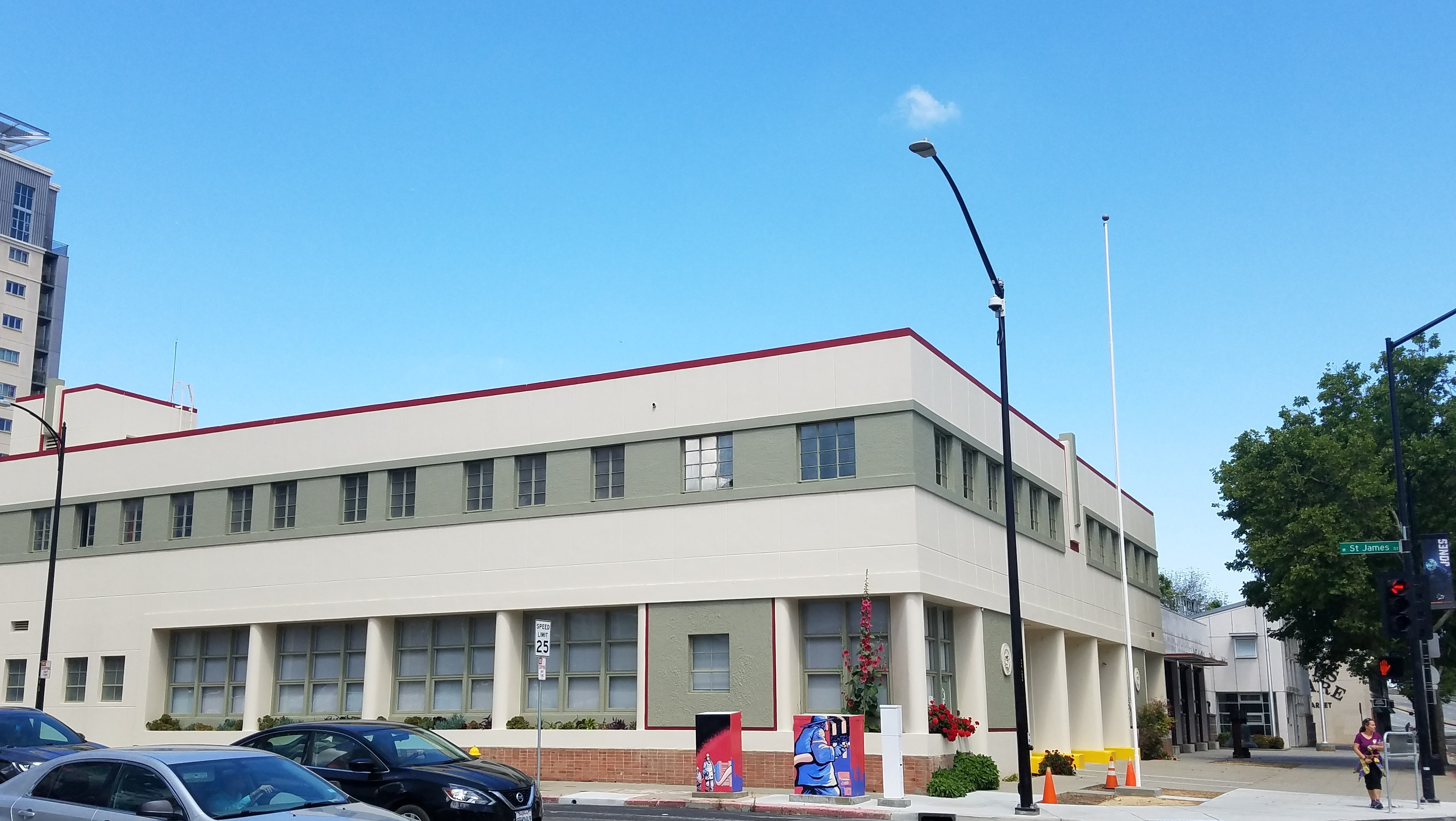
- San Jose Old Central Fire Station

- Location within San Jose, California
- Location: 201 N. Market Street, San Jose, California, US
- Coordinates: 37°20′19″N 121°54′40″W
- Built: 1950–1951
- Architectural style: International and Moderne
- Website: www.sjfiremuseum.org
- NRHP reference No.: 14001113
- Added to NRHP: January 7, 2015

The San Jose Central Fire Station, also known as San Jose Fire Station One, was the central fire station for the San Jose Fire Department in downtown San Jose, California. The International-style firehouse was designed by the architectural firm Binder & Curtis and built in 1951. The station became the city's central fire station, equipped with a new communication system that served as a command center for emergency services across the entire city. Its historical significance is association with the mid-century expansion of San Jose. The building now houses the San Jose Fire Museum on Market Street. The Fire Station was listed on the National Register of Historic Places on January 7, 2015. On January 31, 2024, The Mercury News announced the celebration of the San Jose Fire Department's 170th anniversary at the San Jose Fire Museum.

== History ==
After World War II, the San Jose Fire Department raised $350,000 (equivalent to $5,778,584 in 2025) fire bond to provide funds to build five new fire stations in 1946. The San Jose Central Fire Station (Station No. 1) was designated as the central fire station and emergency communications center for the San Jose Fire Department. The opening of the San Jose Central Fire Station took place in 1951, during the onset of significant growth in San Jose.

From 1951 to 2000, San Jose's Central Fire Station served as the city's main hub for firefighting equipment and personnel. This Modern style building also accommodated the City of San Jose's emergency communications and command center until the late 1950s. A new facility was built in 2000, to the north on the same block, replacing the Central Fire Station. Despite their proximity, the two structures were kept distinct, offering the city the option to repurpose the 1951 firehouse into a civic firefighting museum.

== San Jose Fire Museum ==
The former San Jose Central Fire Station, now the San Jose Fire Museum, stood at the intersection of North Market and West St. James Streets in downtown San Jose. On the opposite end of the same block stands its modern replacement, the San Jose Fire Station No. 1.

The San Jose Fire Museum has a collection of ladders, helmets, documents, and trucks dating back to 1810. John McMillan, president of the San Jose Fire Museum, said "Our goal is to restore this beautiful, historic Old Fire Station One and make it a destination in downtown San Jose."

=== Design ===
The San Jose Fire Station building was designed by the architectural firm Binder & Curtis with William Binder and Ernest N. Curtis as the main architects. The building is a two-story building built in an International Style and Art Moderne in its horizontal banding of windows. Its design featured three bays labeled Battalion 1, Truck 1, and Engine 1. The Central Fire Station was designed to accommodate up to six vehicles inside, two in each bay. This was the first fire station constructed with drive-through bays. The building is constructed using cast-in-place concrete. Its exterior walls feature both horizontal and vertical scoring, mimicking large blocks on each of the four sides. The windows are a combination of multi-light metal casement, tilt, and fixed windows. On the second level, the windows are arranged horizontally and come with integrated concrete header and sill trim, creating a visual band that wraps around and unifies the windows.

== Significance ==
The San Jose Fire Station was placed on the National Register of Historic Places by the State Historic Preservation Office on January 7, 2015. The City of San Jose has designated this site as a city landmark (HL08-169) in 2012. The station is historically significant under Criterion A, in the areas of Patterns and Events at the local level for its association with the mid-century expansion of downtown San Jose during the city's transformation from an agricultural community to the heart of the Silicon Valley. Additionally, it holds significance under Criterion C, in architecture as an example of the later work of the architectural firm Binder & Curtis. The period of significance from 1951 to 1954.

== See also ==
- National Register of Historic Places listings in Santa Clara County, California
- Official website
