= Edgar Holloway House =

Historic house in California, United States

- U.S. National Register of Historic Places
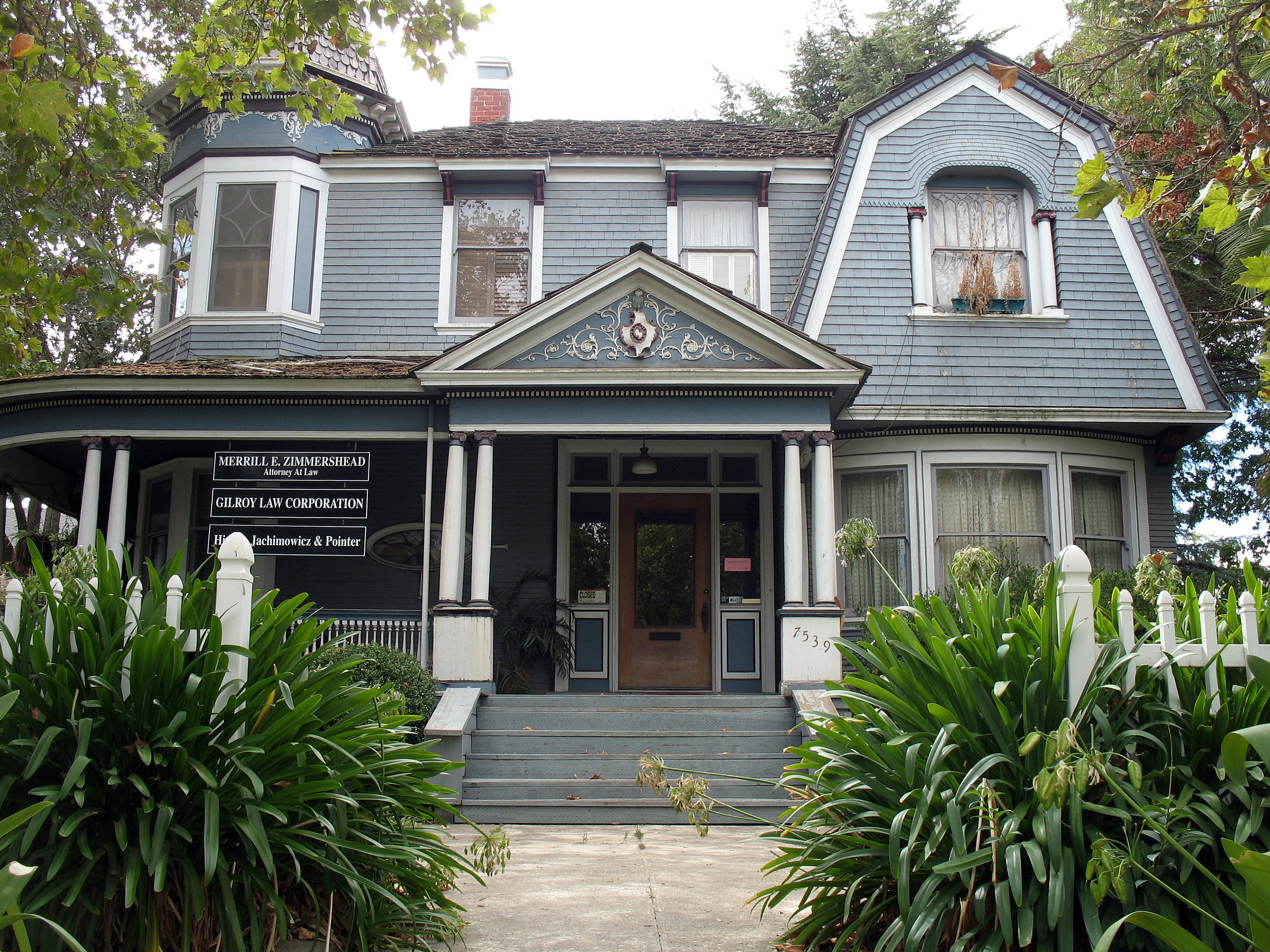
- The house in 2012

- Location within California
- Location: 7539 Eigleberry Street, Gilroy, California
- Coordinates: 37°00′32″N 121°34′12″W
- Area: 0.3 acres (0.12 ha)
- Built: 1903
- Architect: William H. Weeks
- Architectural style: Colonial Revival, Late Victorian, Modified Colonial
- NRHP reference No.: 82002262
- Added to NRHP: January 28, 1982

The Edgar Holloway House is a historic house in Gilroy, California. It was built in 1903 for Edgar and Dora Holloway, whose grandparents had taken part in the California Gold Rush. After they died in 1912–1913, the house was sold out of the Holloway family. It belonged to the Barshinger family until 1949, and it was later repurposed as a battered women's shelter.

The house was designed by William H. Weeks in the Colonial Revival and Victorian architectural styles. It has been listed on the National Register of Historic Places since January 28, 1982.
