= Capt. James A. Hamilton House =

Historic house in California, United States

- U.S. National Register of Historic Places
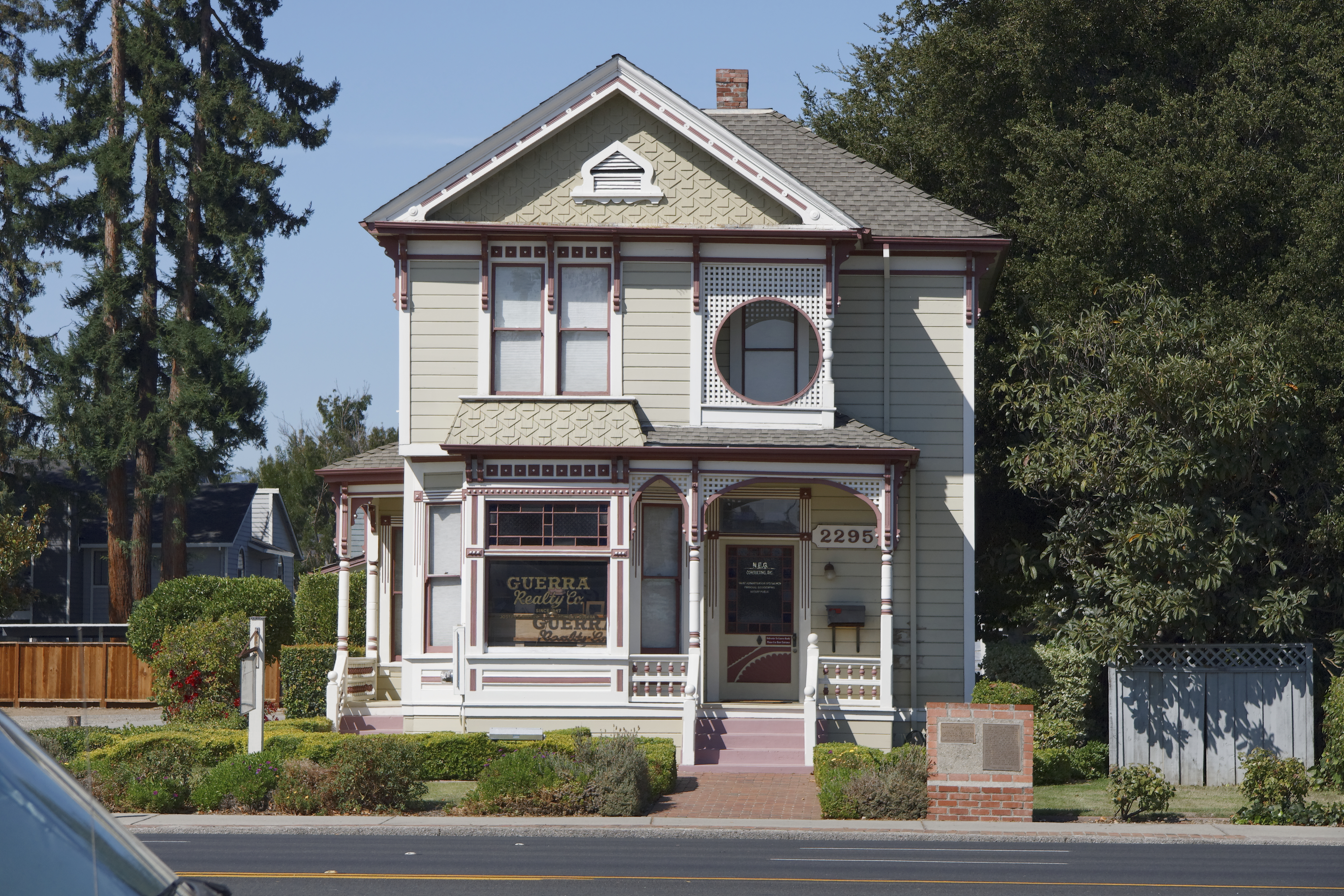
- The house in 2012

- Location within California
- Location: 2295 S. Bascom Ave.
- Nearest city: San Jose, California
- Coordinates: 37°16′54″N 121°55′52″W
- Area: 0.3 acres (0.12 ha)
- Built: 1882
- Architectural style: Italianate, Queen Anne
- NRHP reference No.: 80000864
- Added to NRHP: June 9, 1980

The Captain James A. Hamilton House is a historic house in San Jose, California. It was built in 1882 for James A. Hamilton, his wife, née Anna Thrum, and their children. Hamilton was a sailor.

The Hamilton house was designed in the Italianate and Queen Anne architectural styles. It has been listed on the National Register of Historic Places since June 9, 1980.

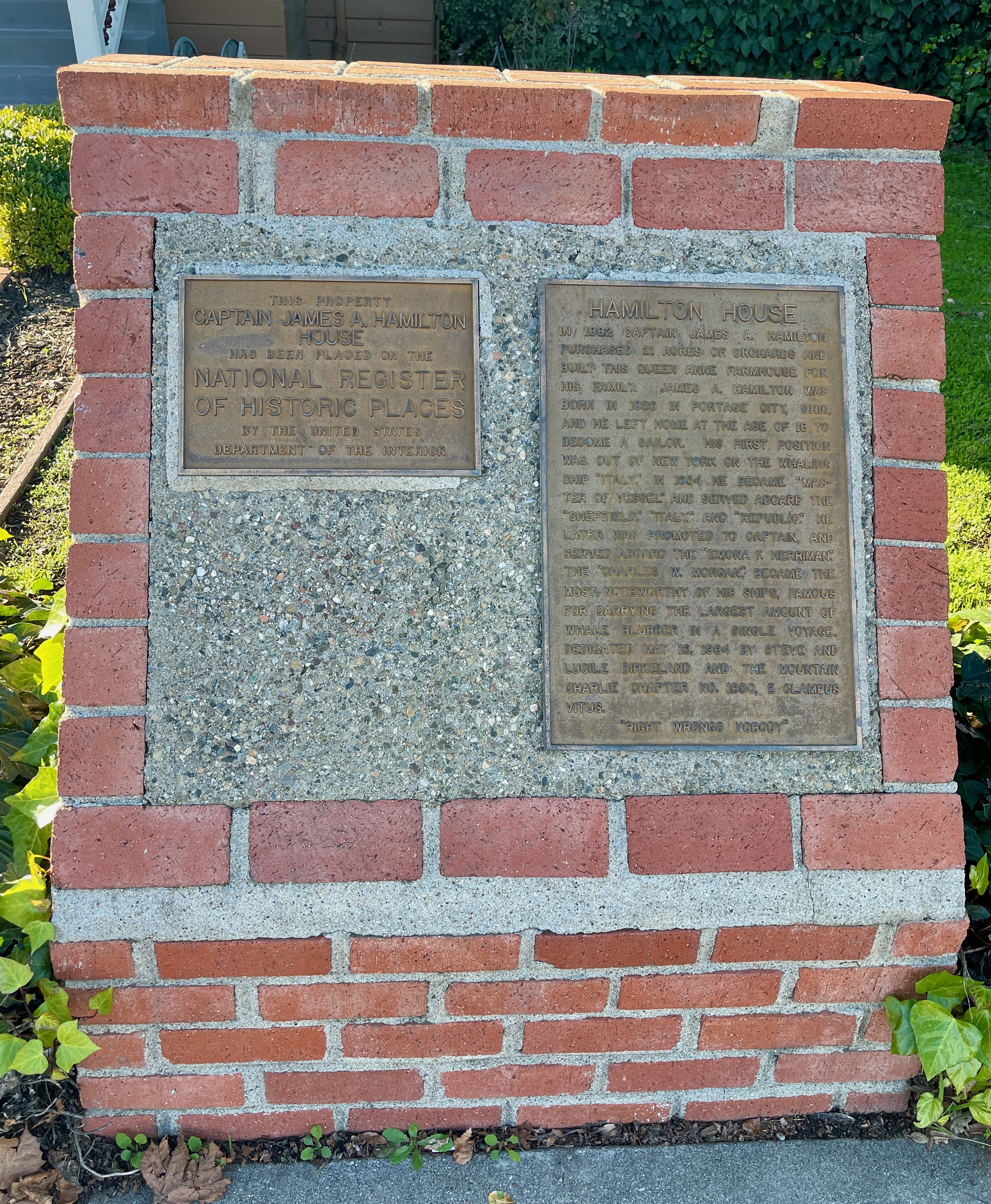
Hamilton House plaque

The Hamilton House has two plaques located on a brick wall in front of the house on 2295 S. Bascom Ave. The one on the left says the house was placed on the National Register of Historic Places by the U.S. Department of the Interior. The second plaque tells the story about Captain James A. Hamilton purchasing 21 acres of orchards and that he built this house for his family.

== See also ==
- National Register of Historic Places listings in Santa Clara County, California
