= Troy Laundry Building (San Jose, California) =

Laundry in San Jose, California

- Troy Laundry
- U.S. National Register of Historic Places
- Troy Steam Laundry
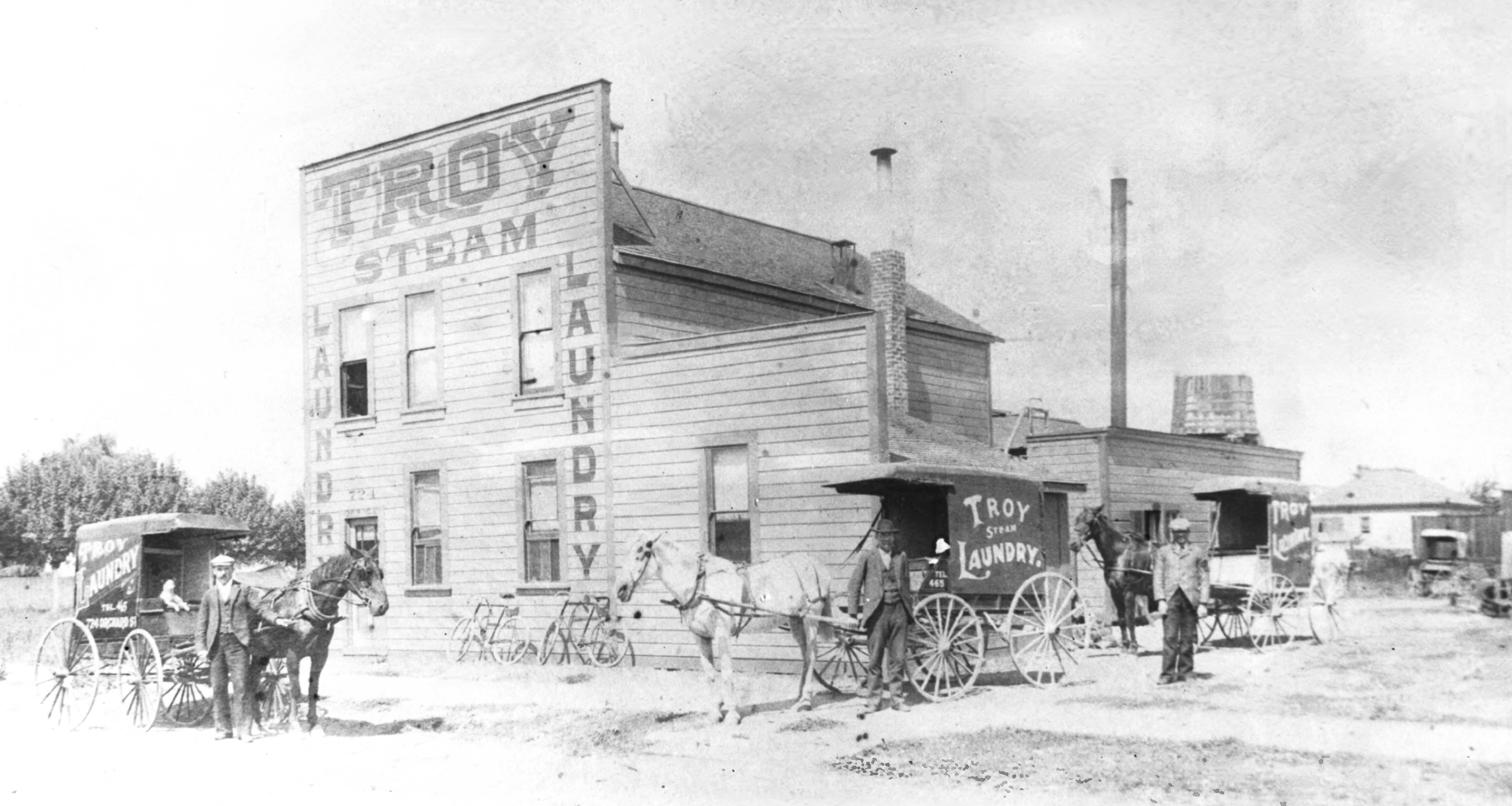
- Troy Laundry, c. 1896

- Location within San Jose, California
- Location: 722 Almaden Avenue, San Jose, California, US
- Coordinates: 37°19′26″N 121°53′04″W
- Area: 11,000 square feet (1,000 m^{2})
- Built: 1895; 131 years ago
- Architectural style: Western false front architecture
- NRHP reference No.: 82002268
- Added to NRHP: January 28, 1982

The Troy Laundry, also known as the Troy Steam Laundry, established in 1895 by Charles Larnell Southgate, was a historic laundry located at 722 Almaden Avenue in San Jose, California. The Troy Laundry operated at this site from 1896 to 1979, serving as an example of 19th-century false front wooden industrial architecture. The site is now occupied by the Troy Apartments. The Troy Laundry was recognized and officially listed on the National Register of Historic Places on January 28, 1982.

== History ==
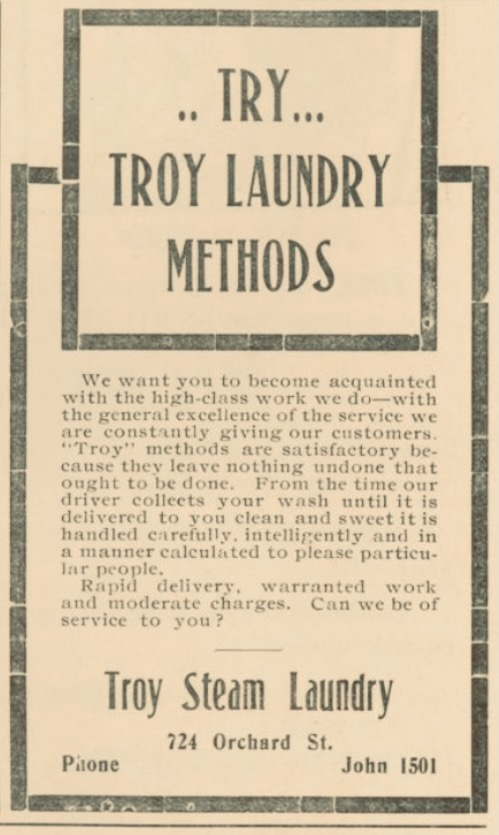
Troy Steam Laundry Advertisement, c. 1906

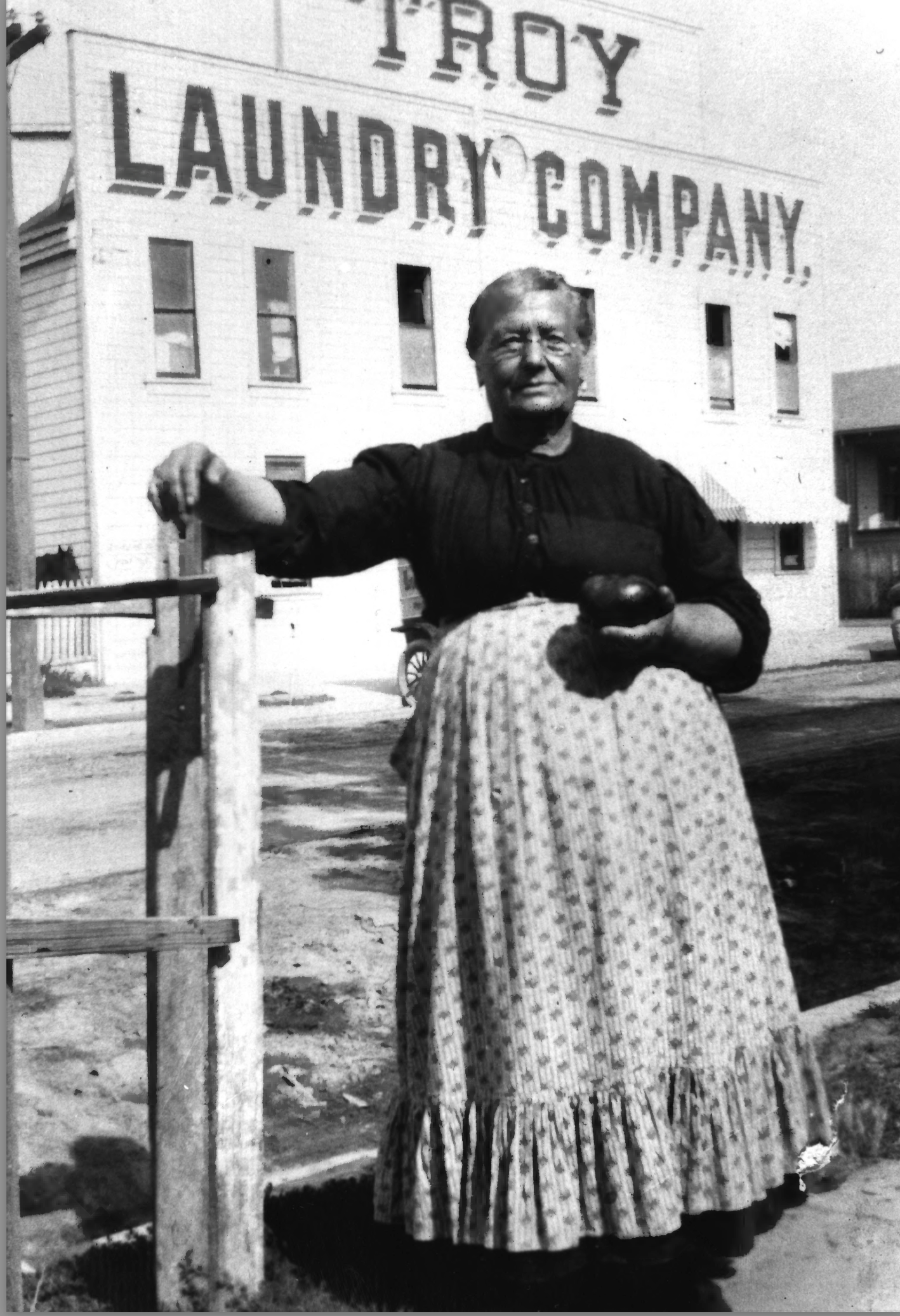
Stella Guarino, who operated a grocery across the street from the Troy Laundry c. 1920

Charles Larnell Southgate (1862-1939) established Troy Laundry and served as its owner. Originally from Brooklyn, New York, he relocated to San Jose in 1895 to start the laundry business. The original name of the company was Troy Steam Laundry, and it was located at 724 Orchard Street in 1896 (renamed Almaden Avenue). In 1895, Southgate partnered with Stiner G. Stinerson. The laundry underwent expansion in 1922-23, overseen by carpenter, Mike Solimine. Southgate remarried in 1922. He had two sons from his first wife. Following Stinerson's death in 1936, Southgate died in 1939. In 1946, ownership passed to the Dalesandro family. Eva and Frank Dalesandro managed the laundry until 1966 when Norman Little acquired it in an estate sale. He operated the business until its sale to Robert E. Fazo in 1979.

The Troy Steam Laundry competed with several other laundries in San Jose, such as the Red Star, Temple, Consolidated, Diamond, Individual, and R&W Wet Wash. Its clientele included prominent establishments in San Jose, such as the Hotel Montgomery, Vendom Hotel, Costa Hotel, San Jose State University, numerous restaurants, and sporting houses. Laundry services were provided to distant locations, including the Lick Observatory, New Almaden Mines, Watsonville, Gilroy, and Stanford University. Initially, laundry was transported by horse-drawn wagons, and later by locally designed trucks from the Southern Pacific Depot in San Jose.

By 1995 the Troy Laundry had been demolished and replaced by Troy Apartments.

== Design ==
The Troy Laundry exemplified late 19th century Western false front architecture, featuring one and two-story wood frame construction spanning an area of 11,000 square feet (1,000 m^{2}). Additions were made in 1922-23, including the replacement of the boiler. The exterior had horizontal wood siding with a gabled roof covered in wood shingles. Windows were double hung with one fixed window in the clerestory to provide light. The false front rose in steps to obscure the gabled roofline and accommodate signage. A one-story section extended to the rear, accommodating the boiler and other facilities.

Post and beam construction was utilized in the laundry work area to create a spacious, open layout like what is commonly seen in today's industrial and manufacturing buildings. A skylight was installed to offer natural light to the steam engine, situated east of the clerestory space. Adjacent to the steam engine, the boiler was positioned and partitioned by a pair of brick walls. This double brick wall extended around the boiler, creating a distinct boiler room.

== Historical status ==
The Troy Laundry was placed on the National Register of Historic Places on January 28, 1982. The Troy Laundry holds historical significance as a landmark commercial establishment, operating in San Jose from 1896 to 1979, and representing a 19th-century false-front wooden industrial architecture.

== See also ==
- National Register of Historic Places listings in Santa Clara County, California
