= Roma Bakery =

Historic bakery in Santa Clara County, California, United States

- U.S. National Register of Historic Places
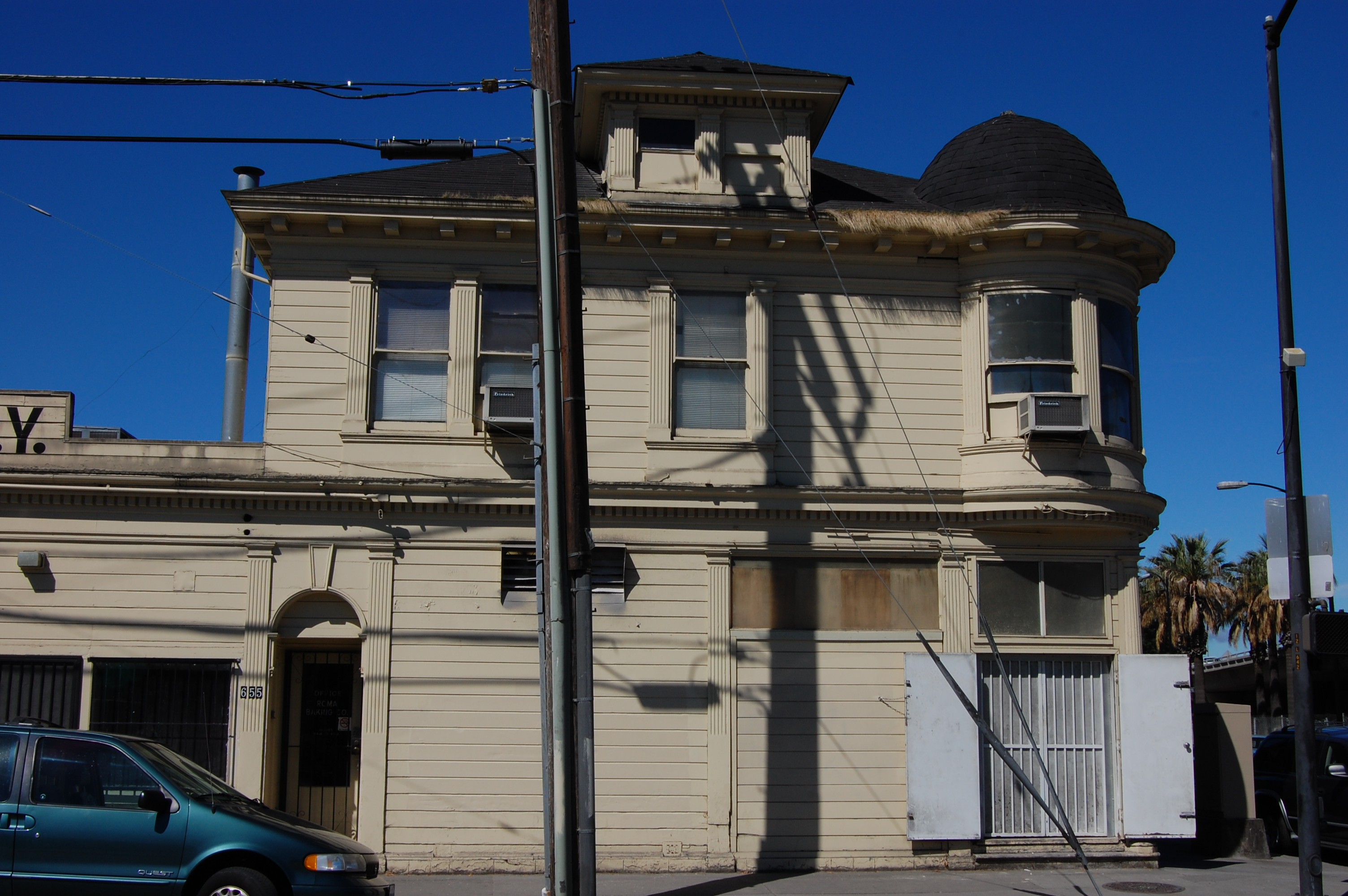
- San Jose Roma Bakery

- Location within San Jose, California
- Location: 655 Almaden Avenue, San Jose, California, US
- Coordinates: 37°20′33″N 121°53′07″W
- Built: 1911
- Architect: Vittorio Pera
- Architectural style: Colonial Revival and Queen Anne
- NRHP reference No.: 82002267
- Added to NRHP: January 21, 1982

The Roma Bakery is a bakery located in San Jose, California built by Vittorio Pera in 1911. The building's architectural style is a blend of Colonial Revival and Queen Anne. The bakery was placed on the National Register of Historic Places on January 21, 1982.

== History ==
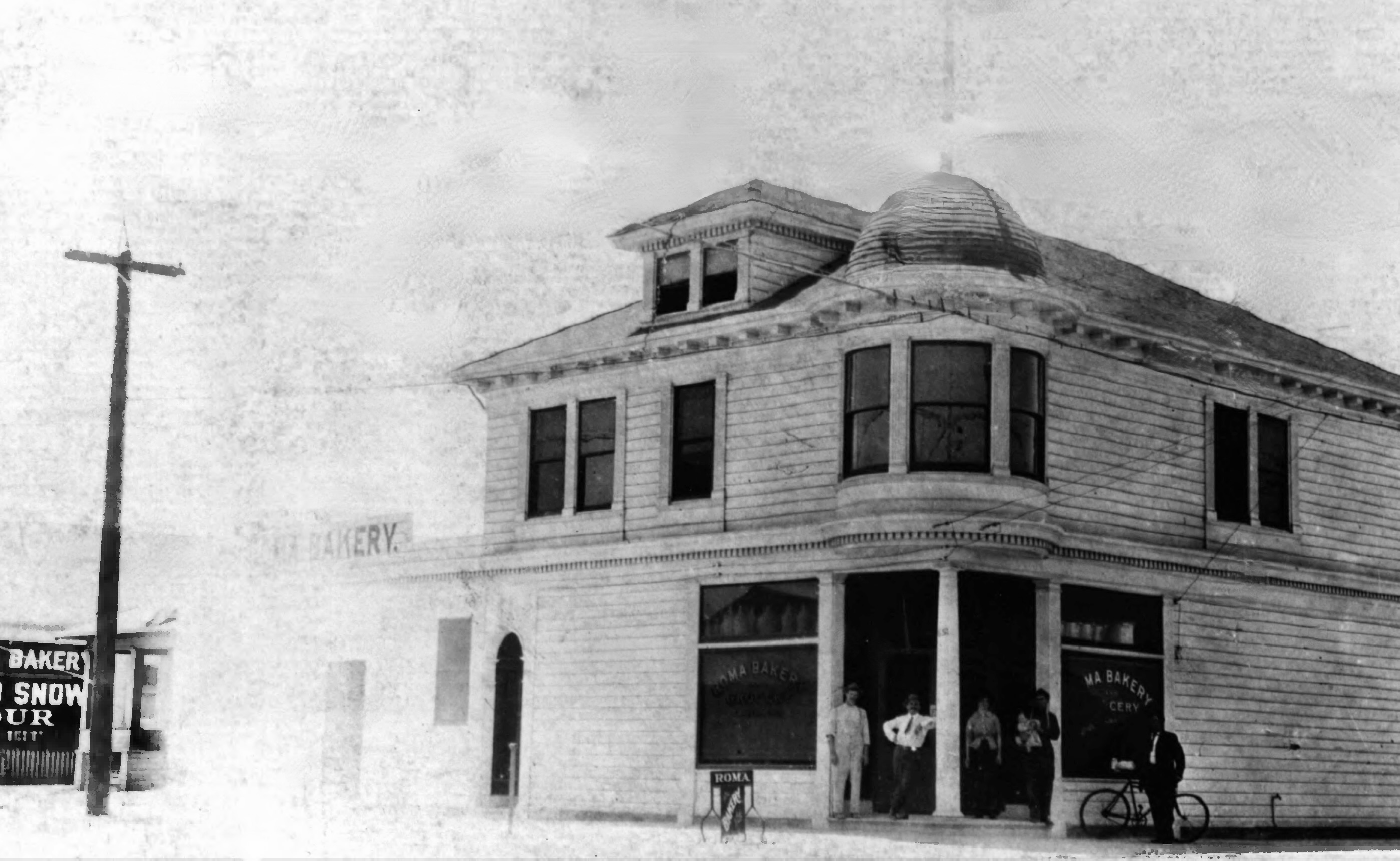
Roma Bakery, view looking southwest, c. 1919.

Pera, who arrived in the United States sometime after 1900 undertook the bakery project for his cousin, Rizieri Pera and his wife Rosa, who had initiated the bakery-grocery business back in 1907. The Pera family has continued to run the same business for three generations.

Mario Pera re-established his father's 1907 Roma Bakery in San Jose in 1952 and sold French and sourdough bread and rolls throughout the Bay Area. Steven Pera, was co-owner of Roma Bakery in Sept. 4, 2020.

== Design ==
The structure's most distinctive architectural feature is the second level turret that occupies the northeast corner of the building. This turret, characteristic of the Queen Anne Victorian-style popular in the 1890s, has a shingled, rounded roof and was once adorned with a flagpole. The entrance has been sealed with horizontal wood siding, and two plate glass windows that flanked the entrance have been partially covered, although the upper sections of these windows remain visible. The original trio of columns still stands within this sealed entrance.

== Historical significance ==
Its architectural style is a blend of Colonial Revival and Queen Anne styles. The Roma Bakery was placed on the National Register on October 23, 1980.

== See also ==
- List of bakeries
- History of California bread
- National Register of Historic Places listings in Santa Clara County, California
