= Pedro de Lemos House =

Historic house in California, United States

- U.S. National Register of Historic Places
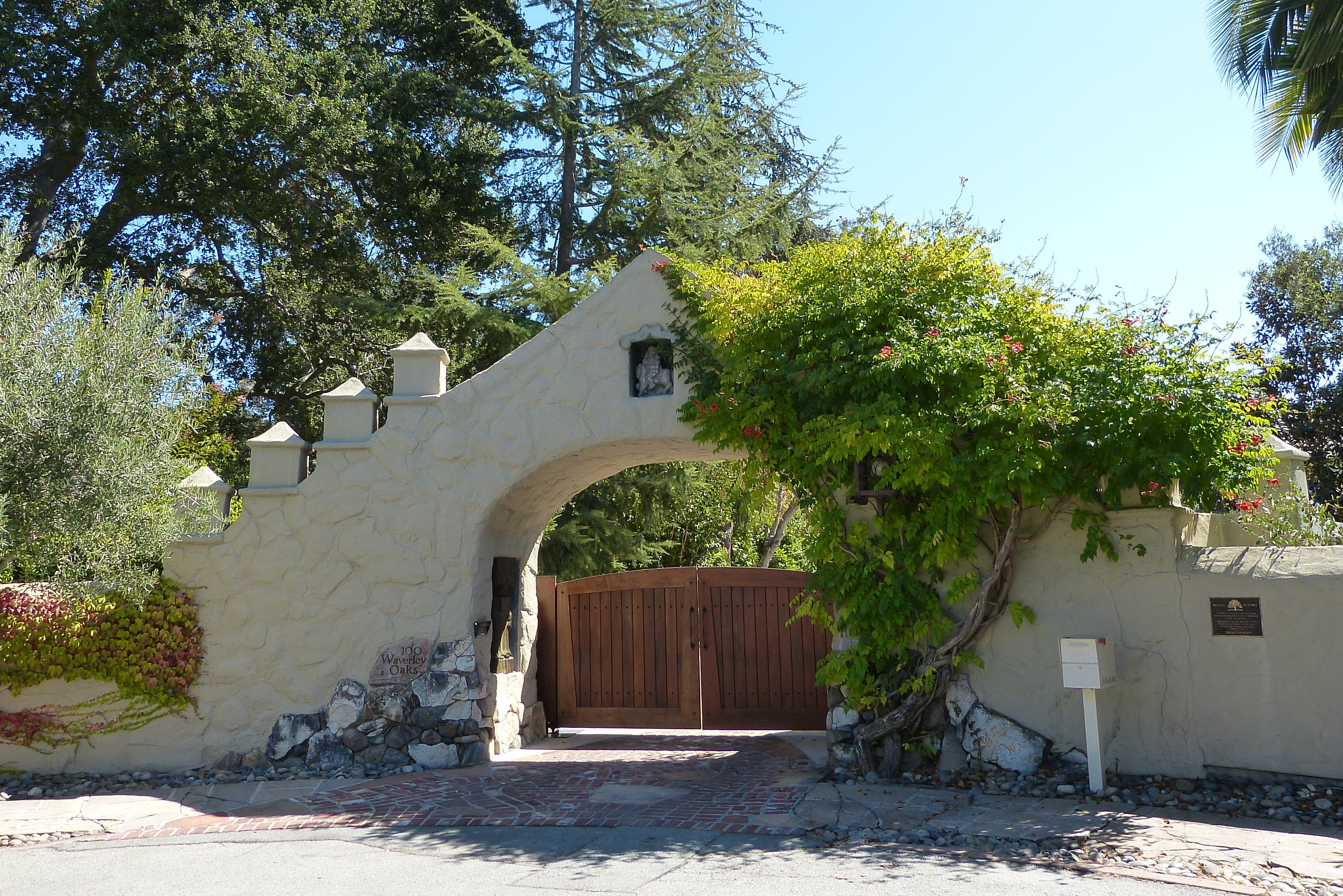
- Front gate

- Location within San Francisco Bay Area Location within California Location within the United States
- Location: 100-110 Waverley Oaks, Palo Alto, California
- Coordinates: 37°26′1″N 122°08′24″W
- Area: 0.7 acres (0.28 ha)
- Built: 1931
- Architectural style: Spanish Colonial Revival
- NRHP reference No.: 80000863
- Added to NRHP: January 10, 1980

The Pedro de Lemos House, also known as Hacienda de Lemos and Waverley Oaks, is a historic house in Palo Alto, California. It was built from 1931 to 1941 for Pedro Joseph de Lemos, a painter, printmaker, illustrator and architect. Lemos also served as the director of the Stanford University Museum of Art from 1918 to 1947. The approximately 9,000 square foot house was design and built by Lemos, from 1931 until 1941.

The house is designed in the Spanish Colonial Revival architectural style. It has been listed on the National Register of Historic Places since January 10, 1980.

In 2005, the house was purchased by entrepreneur Larry Page and is a private residence.

== See also ==
- National Register of Historic Places listings in Santa Clara County, California
