= Frank Norris Cabin =

Historic house in California, United States

- U.S. National Register of Historic Places
- U.S. National Historic Landmark
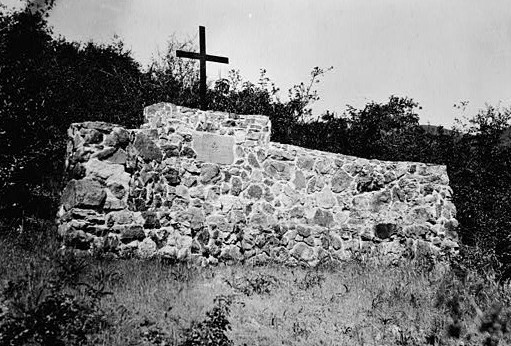
- Frank Norris Memorial

- Location within California Location within the United States
- Nearest city: 7155 L Redwood Retreat Road, Gilroy, California
- Coordinates: 37°2′11″N 121°42′45″W
- Built: 1902
- Architectural style: Log cabin
- NRHP reference No.: 66000235

Significant dates
- Added to NRHP: October 15, 1966
- Designated NHL: December 29, 1962

The Frank Norris Cabin, also known as Redwood Retreat, was a retreat of the author Frank Norris in the Santa Cruz Mountains near Gilroy, California. A log cabin, it was only briefly owned by Norris before his untimely death in October 1902. A circular stone bench, the Frank Norris Memorial, was erected nearby by Fanny Stevenson, a close friend. It was declared a National Historic Landmark in 1962 for its association with Norris, whose novels McTeague and The Octopus: A Story of California are major American literary works of the turn of the 20th century.

== Description ==
The Frank Norris Cabin is located on a remote parcel of private land in the Santa Cruz Mountains, northwest of Gilroy, accessed via the Redwood Retreat Road and a steep 1 mile (1.6 km) hiking trail on that property. It is a single-story log structure with two chambers, and a stone porch. Located a short distance from the cabin is a semicircular stone bench, in which is mounted a plaque bearing the inscription "FRANK NORRIS, 1870 – 1902. Simpleness and gentleness and honor and clean mirth."

Frank Norris purchased 10 acres (4.0 ha) from the owner of the nearby Redwood Retreat Hotel in the summer of 1902, at which time the cabin was already on the property. He had been introduced to the area by Fanny Stevenson, who owned a larger tract immediately adjacent. Norris and his wife Jeannette had spent time on the Stevenson property in 1899, and had become so enamored of the place that he wanted to stay nearby. He named the property "Quien Sabe" after a retreat so named in The Octopus. Norris's usage of the property is unclear: he made arrangements to enlarge the cabin, which had only one room when he bought it, but died quite suddenly (of complications from a burst appendix) in October 1902.

== See also ==
- List of National Historic Landmarks in California
- National Register of Historic Places listings in Santa Clara County, California
