= Ross House (San Jose, California) =

Historic house in California, United States

- U.S. National Register of Historic Places
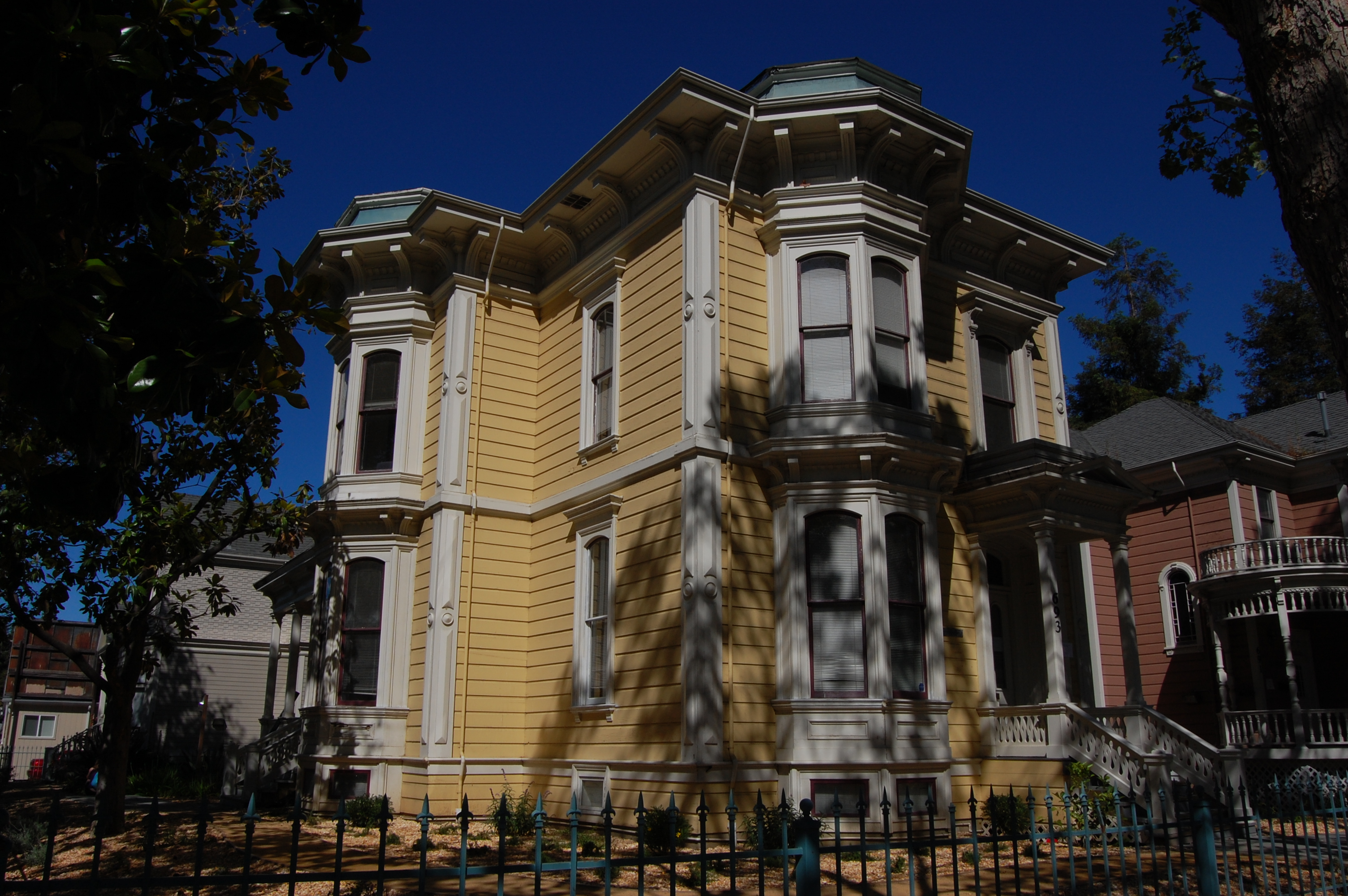
- The house in 2010

- Location within California
- Location: 693 South 2nd Street, San Jose, California
- Coordinates: 37°19′35″N 121°52′51″W
- Area: 0.3 acres (0.12 ha)
- Built: 1878
- Architectural style: Italianate
- NRHP reference No.: 82000992
- Added to NRHP: October 29, 1982

The Ross House is a historic house in San Jose, California. It was built in 1878 for Lyman Ross and his son Oscar. The Rosses were fruit dealers. They owned the house until 1889. From 1900 to 1931, it belonged to William E. Keith, a surgeon. In 1949, the house was "converted to apartments."

The house was designed in the Italianate architectural style. It has been listed on the National Register of Historic Places since October 29, 1982.
