= Lantarnam Hall =

Historic house in California, United States

- U.S. National Register of Historic Places
- Location within California
- Location: 12355 Stonebrook Drive, Los Altos Hills, California
- Coordinates: 37°21′24″N 122°07′19″W
- Area: 7 acres (2.8 ha)
- Built: 1916
- Architect: John H. Powers
- Architectural style: Tudor Revival
- NRHP reference No.: 85003189
- Added to NRHP: December 19, 1985

Lantarnam Hall is a historic mansion in Los Altos Hills, California. It was built in 1914 to 1916 for Percy Morgan, a director of Wells Fargo and trustee of Stanford University. The house was later repurposed as a school.

The house was designed by architect John H. Powers in the Tudor Revival style. It has been listed on the National Register of Historic Places since December 19, 1985.
