= Christian Church of Gilroy =

Historic church in California, United States

- U.S. National Register of Historic Places
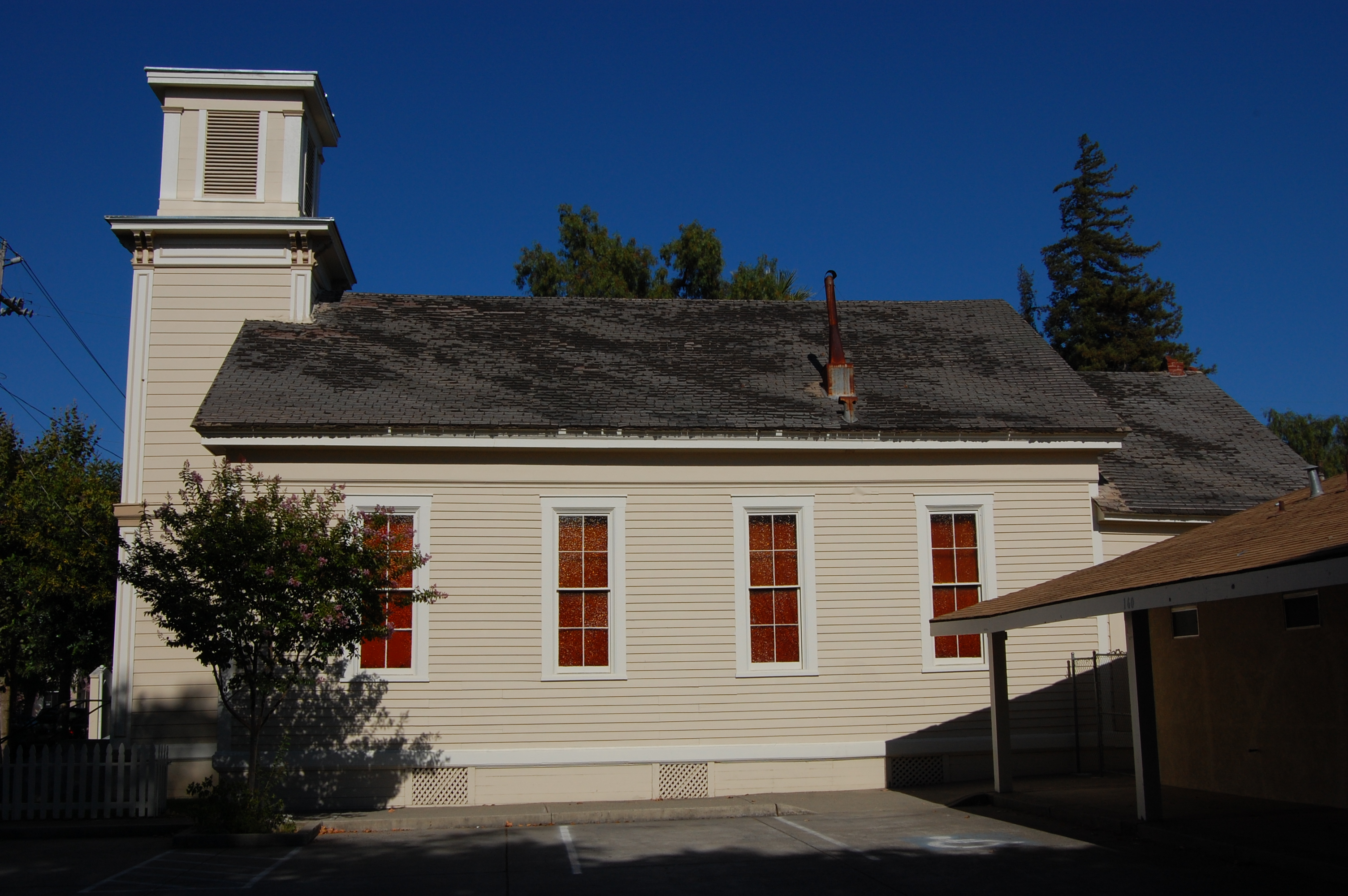

- Location within California Location within the United States
- Location: 160 5th St., Gilroy, California
- Coordinates: 37°0′28″N 121°34′14″W
- Area: 0.4 acres (0.16 ha)
- Built: 1857
- Architectural style: Greek Revival
- NRHP reference No.: 82002261
- Added to NRHP: April 1, 1982

Christian Church of Gilroy is a historic church located at 160 5th Street in Gilroy, California. The church was built in 1857 for Gilroy's congregation of the Christian Church, also known as the Disciples of Christ. The congregation was one of the first of any denomination in Gilroy, and it was the first to build its own church. The Greek Revival church is a rectangular, 1 1/2-story building with a bell tower over the northern entrance. The tower features louvered openings, corner pilasters, and a projecting cornice at the top. The church held the 1859 State Meeting of the Disciples of Christ, which attracted roughly 1,000 attendees. In 1885, the church moved several blocks to its present location.

The church was added to the National Register of Historic Places in 1982.
