= Wilson House (Palo Alto, California) =

Historic house in California, United States

- Carl Wilson House
- U.S. National Register of Historic Places
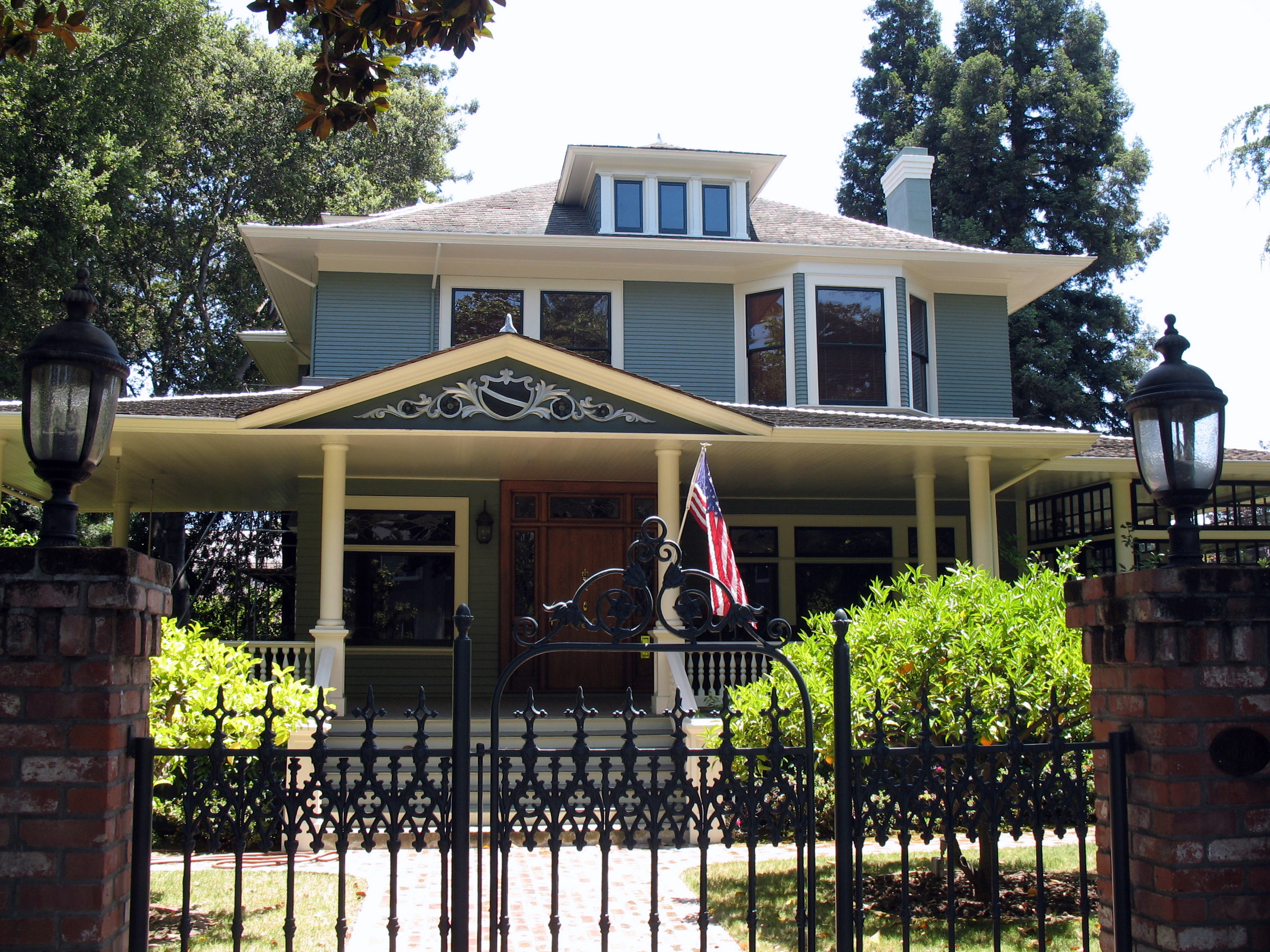
- The Wilson House in 2012

- Location within California
- Location: 860 University Avenue, Palo Alto, California
- Coordinates: 37°27′11″N 122°09′13″W
- Area: 0.5 acres (0.20 ha)
- Built: 1906
- Architectural style: Colonial Revival
- NRHP reference No.: 80000862
- Added to NRHP: January 2, 1980

The Carl Wilson House is a historic house in Palo Alto, California. It was built in 1906. It was designed in the Colonial Revival architectural style. It has been listed on the National Register of Historic Places since January 2, 1980. According to the NRHP: "Almost two stories in height, it is, in terms of size, shape and quality among the finest residential example of its era in Palo Alto. The design is complex, the colors striking, and the rounded forms dictated by the bay are both unusual and difficult to execute. The workmanship is particularly well done."
