= Pettigrew House =

Historic house in California, United States

- U.S. National Register of Historic Places
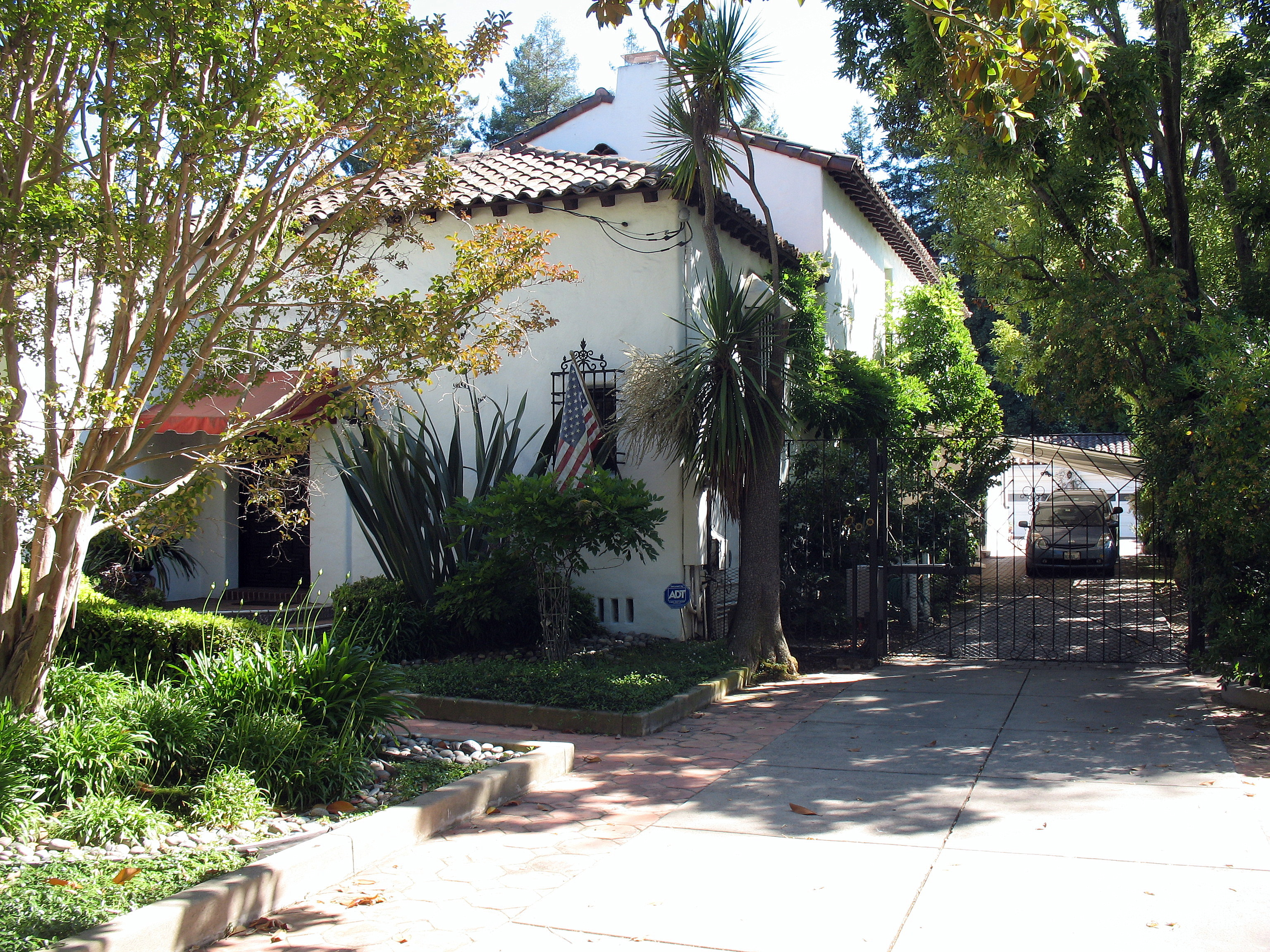

- Location within California Location within the United States
- Location: 1336 Cowper St., Palo Alto, California
- Coordinates: 37°26′29.5″N 122°8′54.5″W
- Area: 0.6 acres (0.24 ha)
- Built: 1925
- Architect: Smith, George W.
- Architectural style: Spanish Colonial Revival
- NRHP reference No.: 80000860
- Added to NRHP: November 25, 1980

The Pettigrew House is a historic house located at 1336 Cowper St. in Palo Alto, California. Architect George Washington Smith designed the Spanish Colonial Revival house, which was built in 1925. Smith, best known for his work in Santa Barbara, is credited with popularizing Spanish Colonial Revival architecture in California. The house is L-shaped with one story in the front and two on the rear wing; it has a white stucco exterior with a red tile roof. The two front windows are covered with iron grilles. French windows in the back of the house open to a garden and paved patio. A decorative system of wooden beams supports the living room and dining room ceilings, and decorative tiles cover the floors of most first-floor rooms.

The house was added to the National Register of Historic Places on November 25, 1980.
