= Fraternal Hall Building =

- U.S. National Register of Historic Places
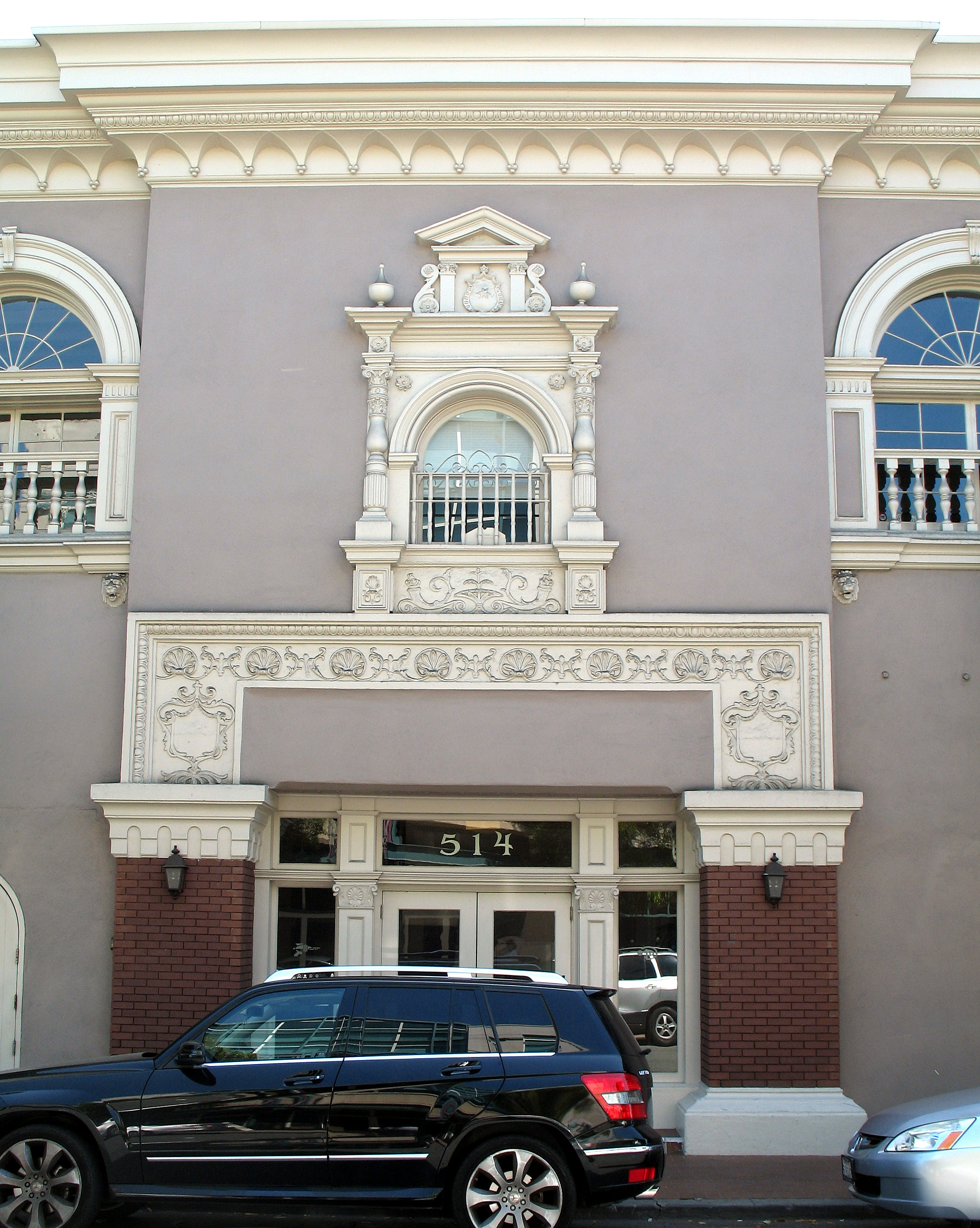

- Location within California
- Location: 140 University Avenue and 514 High Street, Palo Alto, California
- Coordinates: 37°26′36″N 122°09′44″W
- Area: 0.1 acres (0.040 ha)
- Built by: M.P. Madison
- Architect: Samuel Newsom
- Architectural style: Renaissance
- NRHP reference No.: 90000119
- Added to NRHP: February 15, 1990

The Fraternal Hall Building is a historic building in Palo Alto, California. It was built in 1898 for the Fraternal Hall Association. The founding members included Knights of Pythias and Freemasons. The association sold the building in 1925, and the second floor was home to the Elks Club.

The building was designed in the Renaissance architectural style. It has been listed on the National Register of Historic Places since February 15, 1990.
