= Galindo-Leigh House =

Historic house in California, United States

- U.S. National Register of Historic Places
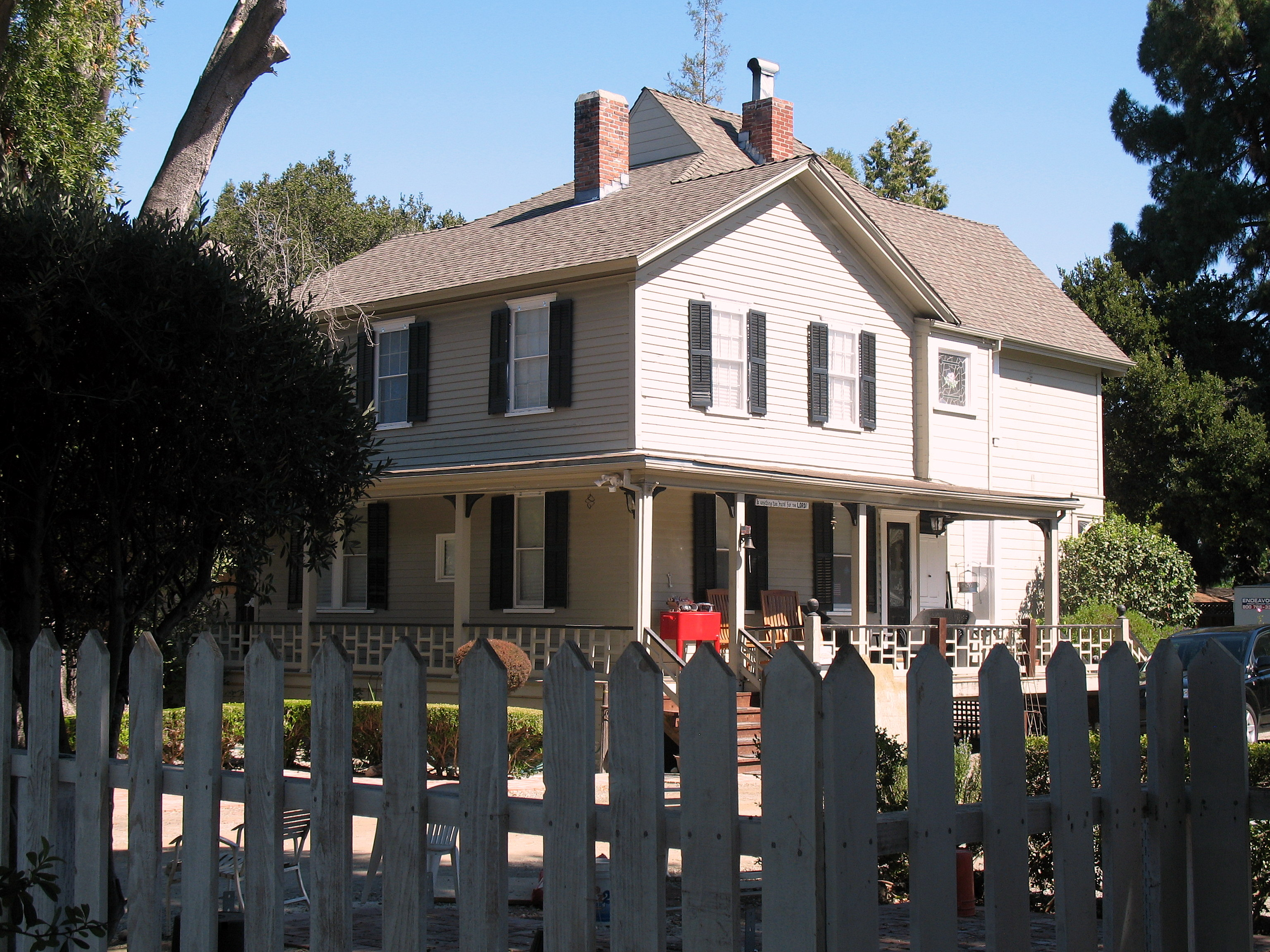
- The house in 2012

- Location within California
- Location: 140 South Peter Drive, Campbell, California
- Coordinates: 37°17′06″N 121°55′21″W
- Area: 1 acre (0.40 ha)
- Built: 1830
- NRHP reference No.: 80000857
- Added to NRHP: August 22, 1980

The Galindo-Leigh House is a historic house in Campbell, California. It was built in the 1830s for Juan Crisostobal Galindo, who became the Major Domo of the Mission Santa Clara a decade later. Galindo expanded the house in the 1840s. It was purchased by John D. Gueraz in 1857, and by Delicia Leigh, in 1874. Leigh was an aristocrat whose father, Alexander Leigh, who was a surgeon, had treated Napoleon. The property has been listed on the National Register of Historic Places since August 22, 1980.
