= Andrew J. Landrum House =

Historic house in California, United States

- U.S. National Register of Historic Places
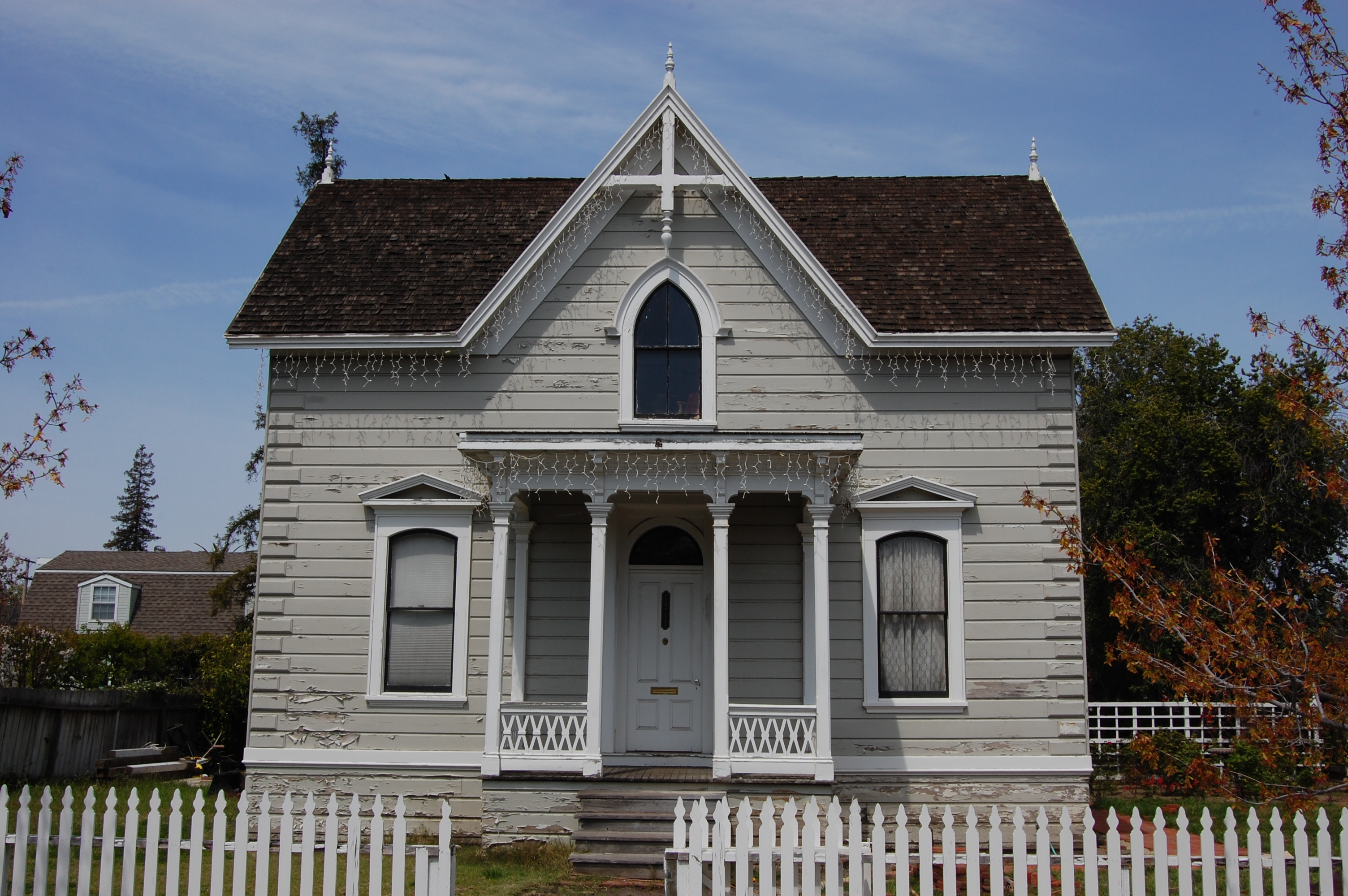
- Location: Santa Clara, California
- Coordinates: 37°20′46.50″N 121°56′44.79″W
- Built: 1875
- Architect: Landrum, Andrew J.
- Architectural style: Italianate / Gothic Revival
- NRHP reference No.: 82002271
- Added to NRHP: February 19, 1982

The Andrew J. Landrum House in Santa Clara, California, was built by Andrew J. Landrum, a prominent Santa Clara pioneer. Constructed in 1875, the house is an example of eclecticism in architectural styles. Landrum combined the then-popular Italianate and Carpenter Gothic styles he found in pattern books, as seen in the corner quoins, the Italianate porch with scroll brackets, gables with cross-bracing and the cruciform interior plan. The two-story wooden residence was built on a T-shaped plan which exhibits crossed, steeply gabled rooflines which are punctuated by a brick chimney and sheathed in wooden shingles.

It is said locally that the Landrum House was one of the few buildings in Santa Clara whose chimney did not crumble in the 1906 San Francisco earthquake. No major alterations have changed the building over the last 125 years and it remains one of Santa Clara's oldest and best preserved houses.

The Landrum house is located at 1217 Santa Clara St. This is a private residence and is not open to the public.
