= Palo Alto Medical Clinic =

- U.S. National Register of Historic Places
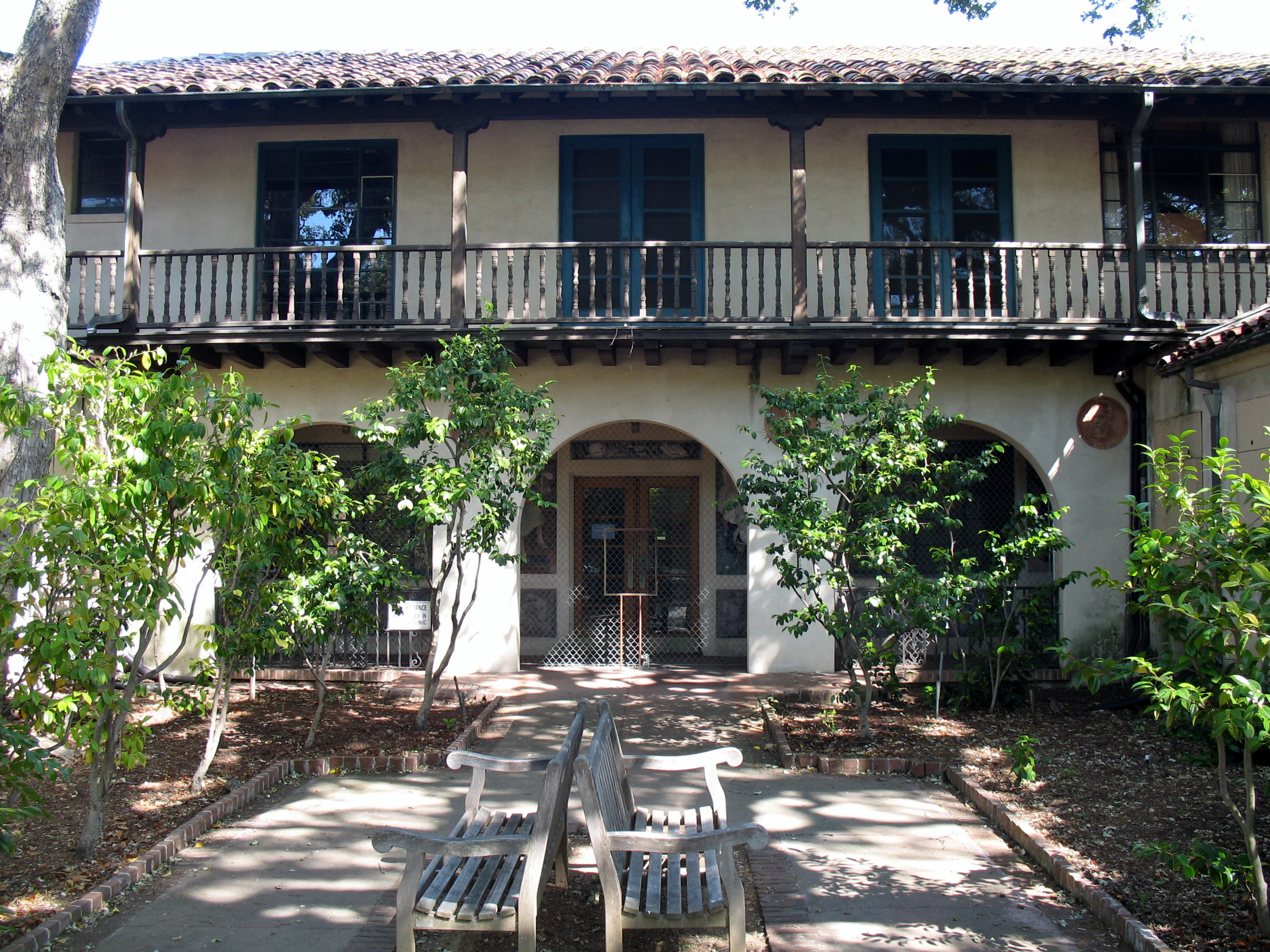

- Location within San Francisco Bay Area Location within California Location within the United States
- Location: 300 Homer Street, Palo Alto, California
- Coordinates: 37°26′37″N 122°09′26″W
- Built: 1932
- Architectural style: Spanish Revival
- NRHP reference No.: 10000357
- Added to NRHP: 2010

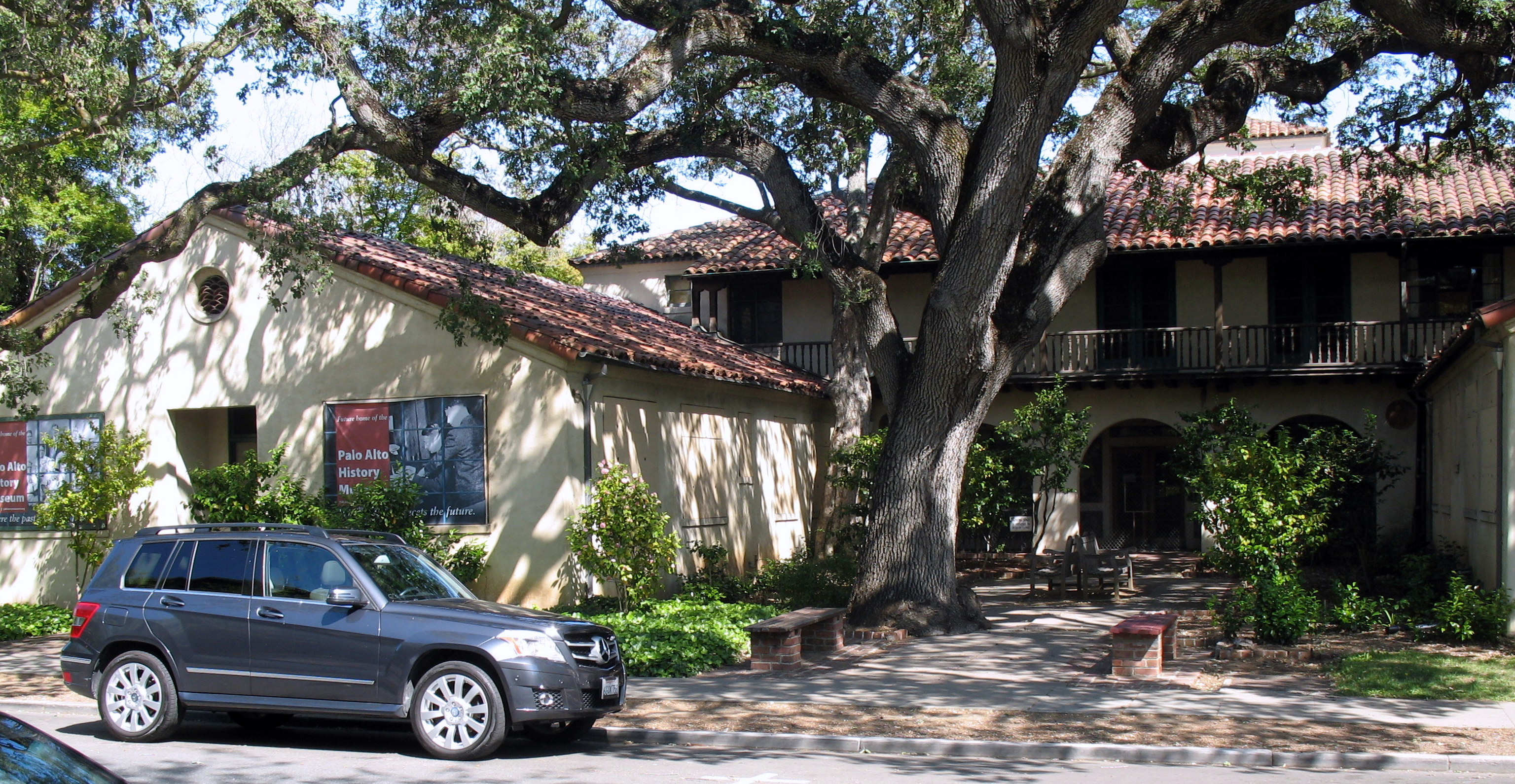
Palo Alto Medical Clinic (2012)

Palo Alto Medical Clinic, also known as the Roth Building (structure built in 1932) was a former medical clinic. The building is located at 300 Homer street, at the corner of Bryant street in Palo Alto, California. It is listed on the National Register of Historic Places listings in Santa Clara County, California since 2010. The building is a good example of Spanish Colonial Revival architecture, and has historical relevance for the Palo Alto community, art history, and medical history.

== History ==
=== Medical clinic ===
In 1924, Dr. Russell Van Arsdale Lee (1895–1982) went into medical practice with Dr. Thomas Williams at an office located at Bryant Street at Hamilton Street in Palo Alto. However the medical clinic grew quickly and they decided to partner with a team of new doctors and move the clinic to a larger space. As a result, the Palo Alto Medical Clinic was founded in 1930 by Russell V. Lee, and five other doctors. The early doctors and founding partners to form the clinic included Edward "Fritz" Roth, Blake Colburn Wilbur, Herbert Niebel, Milton Saier, and Esther Bridgman Clark.

In 1927, pediatrician Esther Clark became a founding partner of the clinic, she was one of the first female doctors on the San Francisco Peninsula, and she went on to later found the Children's Health Council of Palo Alto.

Palo Alto Medical Clinic was an early place for innovations in medicine, they pioneered the model of group practice, and was a predecessor to the Palo Alto Medical Foundation.

=== Building and architecture ===
The Palo Alto Medical Clinic building was designed by Esther Bridgman Clark's brother, local architect Birge Clark and the builder was Wells P. Goodenough. Clark was known for his Spanish Colonial Revival architecture style. The structure was built in 1932. The building is in a U-shape, and built of concrete, stucco and features clay roof tiles and a second floor rustic wood balcony. Below the balcony is an arched arcade which defined a loggia and a courtyard entrance.

=== Arnautoff murals ===
In 1932, Russell V. Lee commissioned artist Victor Arnautoff to paint a series of fresco paintings around the entrance of the building. Arnautoff's mural series all were medically-themed murals done in the recessed under a loggia with four panels of modern medicine and other panels showing primitive medicine, and additionally he four painted medallions of Joseph Lister, Hippocrates, Louis Pasteur, and Wilhelm Röntgen are on the exterior wall of the loggia. The four murals done in color feature modern medicine and depict Luther Emmett Holt, William Osler, and Harvey Cushing. The unveiling of these murals caused a traffic jam and some controversy, in part because one of the murals showed a doctor examining a female patient whose bare breasts were at eye-level.

== Modern-day ==
In 2000, the city of Palo Alto bought the building with the intention of restoration and eventually becoming the home of the Palo Alto History Museum and Palo Alto's historical archives. However the renovations have been delayed due to a lack of funds and a reduced priority by the city budget.

== See also ==
- National Register of Historic Places listings in Santa Clara County, California
