= Alta Mesa Memorial Park =

Burial ground in Palo Alto, California, US

Coordinates: 37°23′54″N 122°07′43″W

- Interactive map of Alta Mesa Memorial Park

Details
- Established: 1904
- Location: Palo Alto, California
- Country: United States
- Size: 72 acres (29 ha)
- Website: www.altamesacemetery.com
- Find a Grave: Alta Mesa Memorial Park

Alta Mesa Memorial Park is a non-denominational burial ground located in Palo Alto, California, United States. It was established in 1904 as a 72-acre (29 ha) cemetery. It includes traditional burial plots, a mausoleum and a columbarium.

Context view of "Pigpen" McKernan's headstone at Alta Mesa

== Notable burials ==
- Frank Bacon (1864–1922), actor and playwright
- Thomas A. Bailey (1902–1983), American historian
- Larry Wu-tai Chin (1922–1986), Chinese spy who worked for the U.S. government for 37 years
- Arthur Bridgman Clark (1866–1948), architect, professor, first Mayor of Mayfield
- Birge Clark (1893–1989), architect
- Leonid (Joseph) Dukhovny (1938–2022), Soviet and American songwriter, poet, musician, bard, producer.
- Tennessee Ernie Ford (1919–1991), musician
- Wilhelmina Harper (1884–1973), successful children's author in the 1930s and 1940s, and published more than 40 compilations of children and young adult stories
- Steve Jobs (1955–2011), co-founder of Apple Inc. (unmarked grave)
- Henry Seymour Kaplan (1918–1984), American radiologist and pioneer in radiation therapy and radiobiology, and the first physician credited with the Atoms for Peace Award.
- Ron "Pigpen" McKernan (1945–1973), keyboardist, harmonica player and lead vocalist, founding member of the Grateful Dead
- Glenn McQueen (1960–2002), Canadian animator at Pixar
- Charles Gilman Norris (1881–1945), novelist
- Kathleen Thompson Norris (1880–1966), American novelist
- David Packard (1912–1996), co-founder of Hewlett-Packard and U.S. Deputy Secretary of Defense
- Guy H. Preston (1864–1952), US Army brigadier general
- Herold Ruel (1896–1963), major-league American baseball player
- William Shockley (1910–1989), developed transistor and won Nobel Prize for Physics
- Shirley Temple (1928–2014), American film and television actress, singer, dancer, and public servant
- Frederick Terman (1900–1982), considered (along with Shockley) the father of Silicon Valley
- Stephen Timoshenko (1878–1972), Professor of Applied Mechanics, Stanford University and namesake of the Timoshenko Medal
- Y.A. Tittle (1926–2017), football player
- Sidney Dean Townley (1867–1946), Professor of Astronomy, Stanford University
- Ray Lyman Wilbur (1875–1949), physician, third president of Stanford University and 31st U.S. Secretary of the Interior
- Bertha Wright (1876–1971), founder of the Children's Hospital Oakland
