= Esther Clark =

Esther Clark may refer to:

- Esther Lewis (poet), English poet, known as Esther Clark after marriage
- Esther Clark (physician), one of the first woman physicians in California
- Esther Clark Wright, née Clark, Canadian historian
- Esther Short, née Clark, early American settler of what would become the state of Washington
