= Birge Clark =

American architect

- Born: April 16, 1893; San Francisco, California, U.S.
- Died: April 30, 1989 (aged 96)
- Resting place: Alta Mesa Memorial Park
- Education: Stanford University, Columbia University
- Occupation: architect
- Spouse: Lucile Townley
- Children: 4
- Father: Arthur Bridgman Clark

Birge Malcolm Clark (April 16, 1893 – April 30, 1989) was an American architect, called “Palo Alto's best-loved architect” by the Palo Alto Weekly; he worked largely in the Spanish Colonial Revival style.

== Biography ==
=== Early life ===
Clark was born April 16, 1893, in the Women’s and Children’s Hospital in San Francisco, California, though his birth certificate was destroyed in the San Francisco earthquake. He was the son of Hanna Grace Birge and Arthur Bridgman Clark, a professor of art and architecture at Stanford and the first mayor of Mayfield, California, later part of Palo Alto. He graduated from Palo Alto High School in 1910. He received an A.B. degree in Graphic Design from Stanford University in 1914, and received a Bachelors degree in Architecture from Columbia University in 1917. He served in the United States Army, as an observation balloon pilot in World War I; he was shot down by a German pilot and won the Silver Star for gallantry.

Clark's younger sister, Esther Clark, became one of the first women physicians in the country, and was a prominent local pediatrician and a founder of the Palo Alto Medical Clinic.

=== Career ===
His principal architectural works at Stanford University are the Lou Henry Hoover House (assisting his father and now the residence of the university President), the three John Stauffer laboratories (1960’s), and the Seeley G. Mudd Chemistry Building (1977).

His principal works in Palo Alto include the old Police Station and Fire station (now the senior citizen’s center), the Lucie Stern Community Center, the President Hotel, the Palo Alto Post Office (1932), the Palo Alto Medical Clinic, and much of the 500 block of Ramona Street in downtown Palo Alto. Some of the notable and historic homes Clark built in Palo Alto include the Norris House at 1247 Cowper Street, the Dunker House at 420 Maple Street and Lucie Stern’s house at 1990 Cowper Street.

=== Personal life ===
He was married to the former Lucile Townley, daughter of Stanford mathematician and astronomer Sidney Dean Townley, for sixty-three years, until her death in 1986. They had four sons: Richard Townley Clark, Dean Townley Clark, Birge Gaylord Clark, and Malcolm Mallory Clark, along with 18 grandchildren.

== Notable buildings by Birge Clark ==
| Year built | Name | City | Style | Notes |
|---|---|---|---|---|
| 1919 | Lou Henry Hoover House, 623 Mirada Avenue | Stanford, California | International style house | This house was designed by Lou Hoover, with supervision by Arthur Bridgman Clark and his son, Birge Clark. |
| 1921 | Townleys House, 661 Cabrillo Avenue | Stanford, California | | He designed this home with his father, for his future in-laws. He was married here. Previously located at 613 Salvatierra. |
| 1924 | Addison School, 650 Addison Avenue | Palo Alto, California | | |
| 1925 | Dunker House, 420 Maple Street | Palo Alto, California | Spanish Colonial Revival | listed on the National Register of Historic Places since 1982. |
| 1926 | Elizabeth Hughes Chapel, Castilleja School, 1310 Bryant Street | Palo Alto, California | Craftsman style | 500-seat capacity auditorium. the school has no religious affiliation. The similar style building on the campus, the administration building was designed by Roy C. Heald. |
| 1926 | Pacific Art League, 668 Ramona Street | Palo Alto, California | Spanish Colonial Revival | |
| 1927 | 440 – 450 Bryant Street | Palo Alto, California | Spanish Colonial Revival | Former police station and fire station. |
| 1927 | Charles and Kathleen Norris House, 1247 Cowper Street | Palo Alto, California | | |
| 1929 | President Hotel, 480 – 498 University Avenue | Palo Alto, California | | |
| 1932–1936 | Lucie Stern Community Center, 1305 Middlefield Road | Palo Alto, California | Spanish Colonial Revival | A complex of buildings. The construction was done by Wells P. Goodenough. |
| 1932 | Alta Mesa Memorial Cemetery, 695 Arastradero Road | Palo Alto, California | | |
| 1932 | United States Post Office (Palo Alto, California) | Palo Alto, California | Mediterranean Revival style | |
| 1932 | Palo Alto Medical Clinic, 300 Homer Avenue | Palo Alto, California | Spanish Colonial Revival | |

== Publications ==
- Birge Clark (1971). World War I Memoirs. Unknown publisher. p. 176pp. ASIN B00072VNZ2.
- Birge Clark (1969). Memoir About Mr. & Mrs. Herbert Hoover, with Particular Emphasis on the Planning and Building of Their Home on San Juan Hill. Privately published.

== See also ==
- National Register of Historic Places listings in Santa Clara County, California
