= Olive MacFarland =

American illustrator (1872–1962)

Olive Knowles Hornbrook MacFarland
- Born: West Virginia
- Died: 1961; San Mateo, California
- Occupation: Scientific illustrator
- Spouse: Frank Mace MacFarland (married 1902-1951)

Olive Knowles MacFarland (née Hornbrook; 1872–1962) was an American artist and illustrator. She attended Ohio Wesleyan College and earned degrees in physiology at Stanford University. She created watercolor drawings to illustrate the scientific publications of her husband, American malacologist Frank Mace MacFarland, and prepared his notes on opisthobranch mollusks for publication after his death.

== Biography ==
Olive Knowles Hornbrook was born in West Virginia in June 1872. She was educated in Cambridge, Ohio. After earning a B.L. from Ohio Wesleyan College in 1893, she taught Latin at the Barnesville, Ohio, High School from 1893 to 1898. On August 27, 1902, Hornbrook married Professor Frank Mace MacFarland of Stanford University. She studied physiology at Stanford, earning her B.A. in 1906 and her M.A. in 1908.

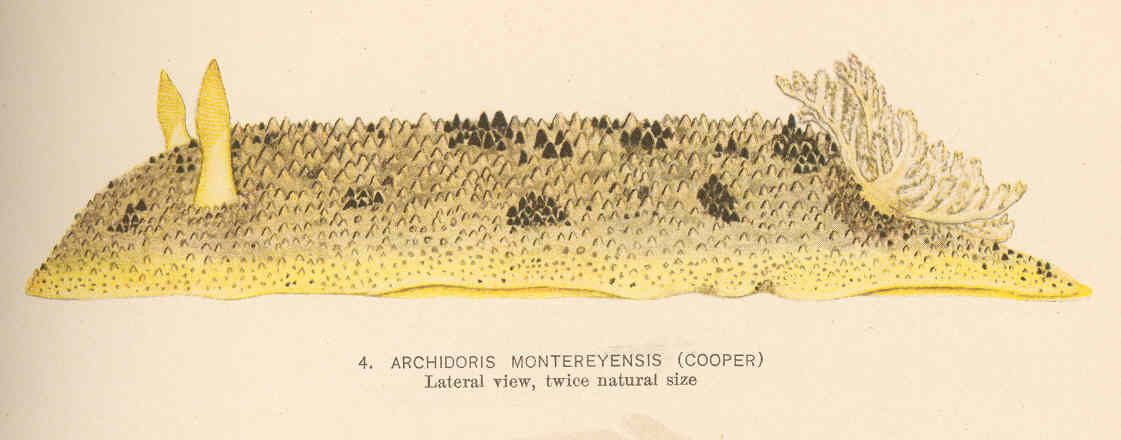
Illustration from Opisthobranchiate Mollusca from Monterey Bay, California, and Vicinity

The MacFarlands collaborated closely in studying mollusks in the Monterey Bay area. Olive MacFarland was an accomplished artist and created watercolor drawings to illustrate Frank MacFarland's publications. After Frank MacFarland's death, Olive MacFarland spent ten years organizing his notes and manuscripts for "Studies of opisthobranchiate mollusks of the Pacific coast of North America," which was published in the Memoirs of the California Academy of Sciences. She also prepared the illustrations.

MacFarland died in 1962 in San Mateo, California. In 2006, the MacFarland home on the Stanford campus (designed in 1914 by Arthur Bridgman Clark) was added to the National Register of Historic Places.
