= Dwight Wilbur =

Dwight Wilbur may refer to:

- Curtis D. Wilbur (1867–1954), American lawyer and judge
- Dwight Locke Wilbur (1903–1997), medical doctor and president of the American Medical Association
