= Sidney Dean Townley =

American astronomer and geodeticist

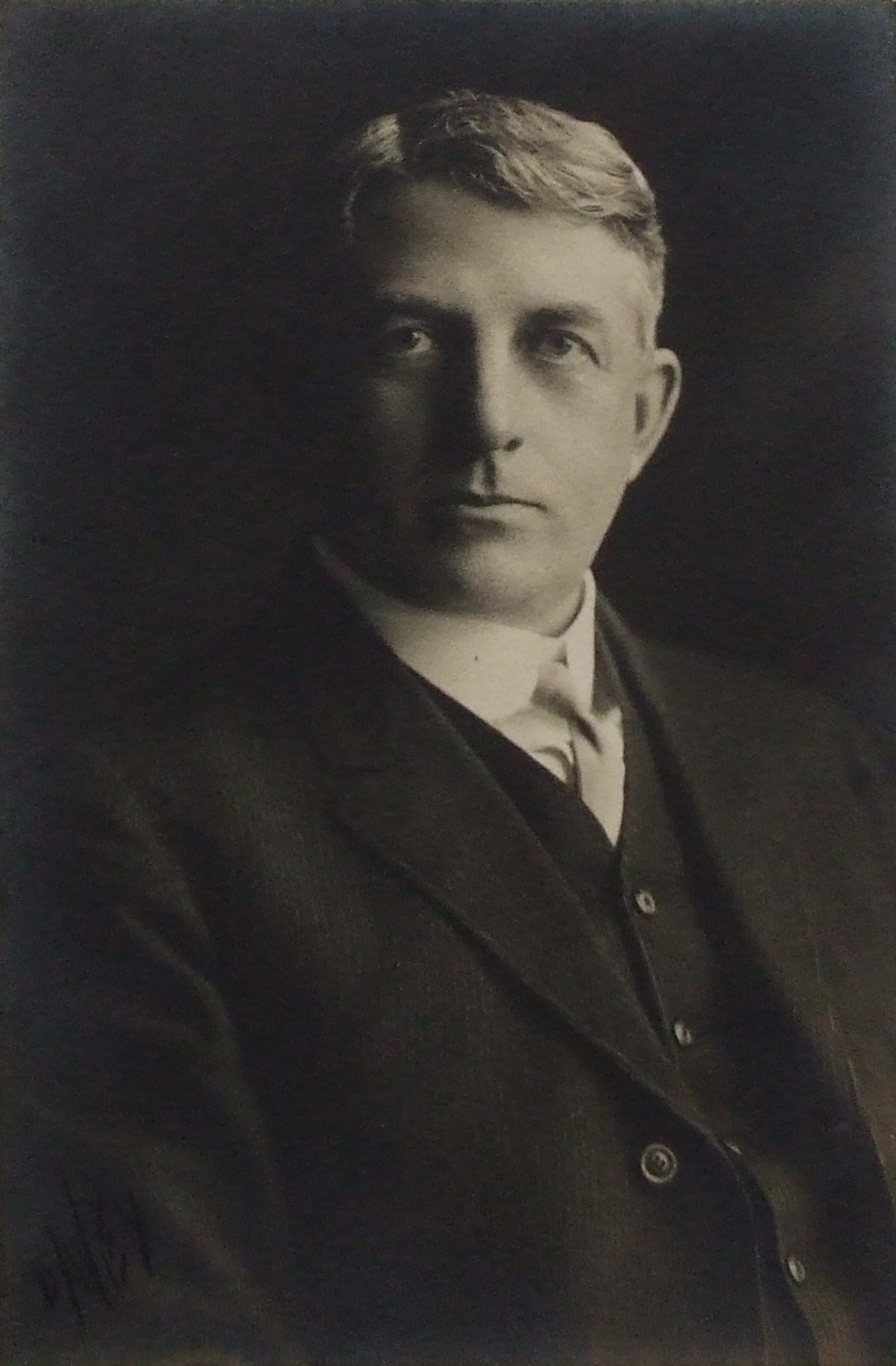
- Sidney Dean Townley, c.1918
- Born: April 10, 1867; Waukesha, Wisconsin, U.S.
- Died: March 18, 1946 (aged 78); Stanford, California, U.S.
- Resting place: Alta Mesa Memorial Park
- Other name: S.D. Townley
- Education: University of Wisconsin–Madison, University of Michigan
- Known for: professor, researcher, astronomer, geodeticist
- Spouse: Frances May Wright

Sidney Dean Townley (April 10, 1867 – March 18, 1946) was an American astronomer and geodeticist. He was a professor at Stanford University from 1911 until 1932. Among many other posts, Townley served as an instructor of astronomy at the University of Michigan and the University of California, Berkeley he was also the president of the Astronomical Society of the Pacific in 1916. Throughout the course of his career he published around 100 academic papers and edited many more, he was recognized for his excellent editorial skills.

== Early life and education ==
Townley was born on April 10, 1867, in Waukesha, Wisconsin, to Reverend Robert Townley and his wife Mary Wilkinson. After the equivalent of a high school education in 1885, he gained a job as a clerk in the local town bank. A year and a half later he was admitted to the University of Wisconsin–Madison.

During his second year at the university he took a course in astronomy. He was also given a room at the Washburn Observatory and worked nights as an assistant. These would serve to shape his interest in astronomy. He studied astronomy under George Comstock. In his second year as a graduate student he was offered a Hearst fellowship at the Lick Observatory, which he accepted, arriving in 1892. In 1893, however, the fellowship funds were re-committed to an eclipse expedition to Chile, so he had to depart.

He would graduate with a B.S. degree in 1891 with distinction, and become a member of Phi Beta Kappa. After graduation that same year he visited his brother living in California, which made him interested in Lick Observatory.

== Career ==
He became an instructor of astronomy, first at the University of Michigan, later followed by the University of California.

From 1893 until 1898 he worked at the Detroit Observatory, where he studied variable stars and comets. By 1897, he gained his Sc.D. from the University of Michigan with a thesis on the "Orbit of Psyche". In 1896, he spent a year on-leave to travel through Germany, visiting major observatories in Berlin, Leipzig, and Munich.

After his return from his travels he began teaching at the University of California, Berkeley, under Armin Otto Leuschner. He was later appointed director of the International Latitude Station at Ukiah, California. While there he developed an interest in geodesy, particularly seismology.

Townley was a member of the Astronomical Society of the Pacific during its early years and served as its president in 1916, and also spent time as director and on the publication committee. He also joined the Seismological Society, and served at various times as president, secretary-treasurer, and editor of the society journal.

In 1911 he became an assistant professor at Stanford University. By 1918, he became full professor, and would remain in that position until his retirement in 1932, thereafter becoming professor emeritus.

== Death and legacy ==
Toward the end of his life he became an invalid, although he remained mentally alert until he died. He died March 18, 1946, at Stanford, California.

During his career he published roughly 100 academic papers, and edited the contributions of many others. He was widely recognized for his editorial skills.

The crater Townley on the Moon is named after Townley.

== Private life ==
He married Frances May Wright on January 7, 1895, in Oregon. Together they had three daughters and at the time of retirement lived in Palo Alto, California.

His daughter Lucile Townley Clark, married architect, Birge Clark. Birge Clark's father was architect and Stanford University design professor Arthur Bridgman Clark who designed the Townley's residence at 613 Salvatierra (now 661 Cabrillo Avenue; built 1921) in Stanford, California. Another daughter, Isabel Townley Marx married the son of Stanford University mechanical engineering professor Guido Hugo Marx. Daughter Ruth Townley was born on February 13, 1908, and died on September 28, 1908. His youngest daughter, Frances Jane Townley was born on May 19, 1911. She married architect David Clark (her brother-in-law, Birge's Clark's brother).

== Bibliography ==
- Sidney Dean Townley and Maxwell Wilford Allen, "Descriptive catalogue of earthquakes of the Pacific Coast of the United States, 1769 to 1928", 1939, Bulletin of the Seismological Society of America, 29.
- Sidney Dean Townley, Annie Jump Cannon, and Leon Campbell, "Harvard catalogue of long period variable stars", 1928, The Observatory, Cambridge, Mass.
