= United States Post Office (Palo Alto, California) =

- U.S. Post Office
- U.S. National Register of Historic Places
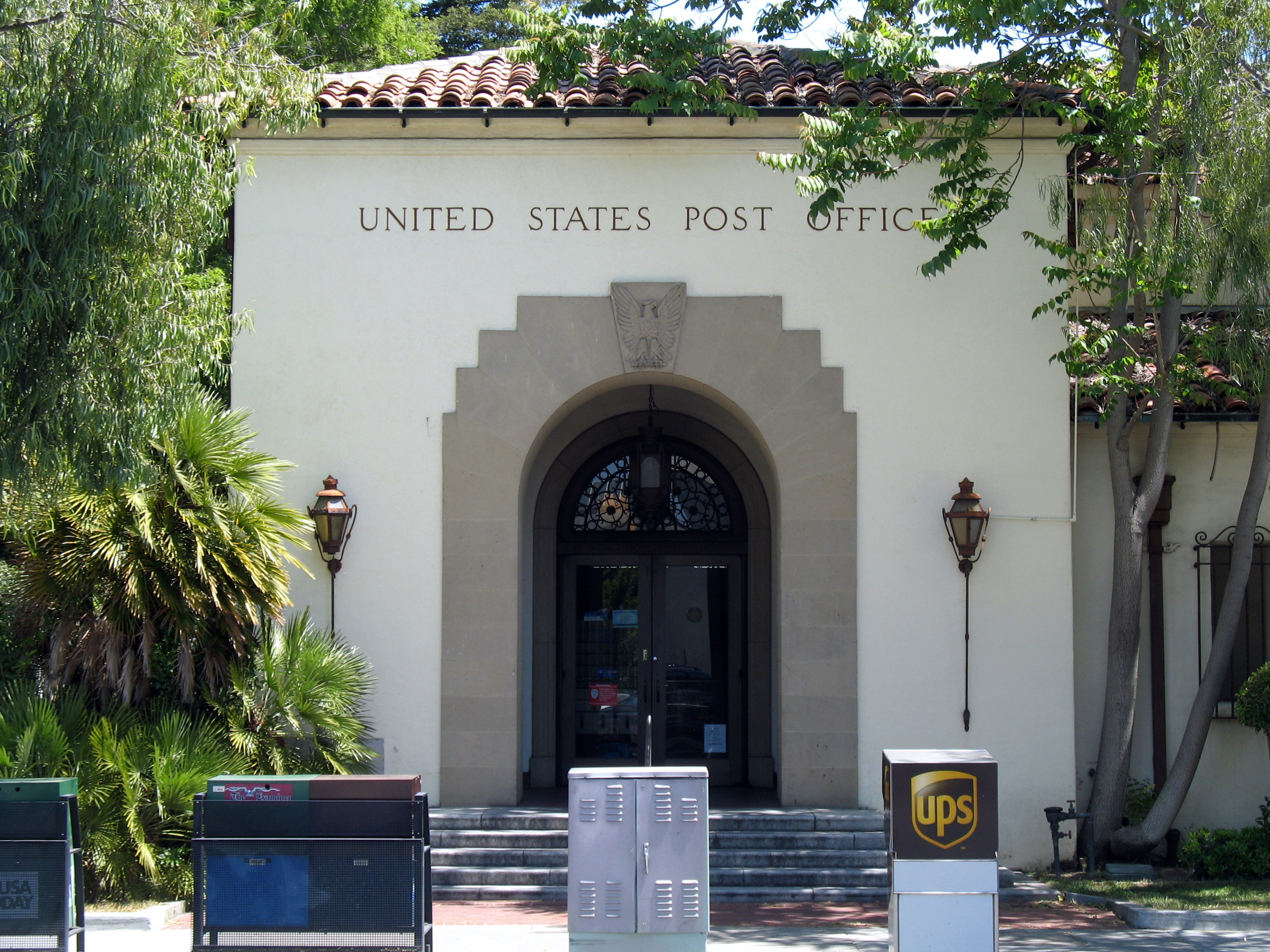

- Location within California Location within the United States
- Location: 380 Hamilton Ave., Palo Alto, California
- Coordinates: 37°26′46″N 122°9′29″W
- Area: 0.8 acres (0.32 ha)
- Built: 1932–33
- Architect: Clark, Birge M.
- Architectural style: Mediterranean Revival
- NRHP reference No.: 81000175
- Added to NRHP: April 5, 1981

The Hamilton Station is a historic post office in Palo Alto, California. Formerly the main office for the city of Palo Alto, the post office was added to the National Register of Historic Places on April 5, 1981, as the U.S. Post Office.

== History ==
The post office was constructed from 1932 to 1933 and was designed by Palo Alto architect Birge Clark; during the Great Depression, the Post Office department hired local architects to design post offices rather than designing them in Washington. The building was designed in the Mediterranean Revival style and features a tile hip roof in varying shades of red, an open arcade with round arches in the front, and round arched entryways at both ends of the arcade. The entries have bronze frames and decorative bronze transoms; the doors were originally bronze as well but were replaced with lighter metals. While the Mediterranean Revival style was at the time an unusual choice for a post office, it was widely used in Palo Alto and at Stanford University; the post office is one of the few that reflect regional architecture.

== See also ==
- List of United States post offices
- National Register of Historic Places listings in Santa Clara County, California
