= Dunker House =

Historic house in California, United States

- U.S. National Register of Historic Places
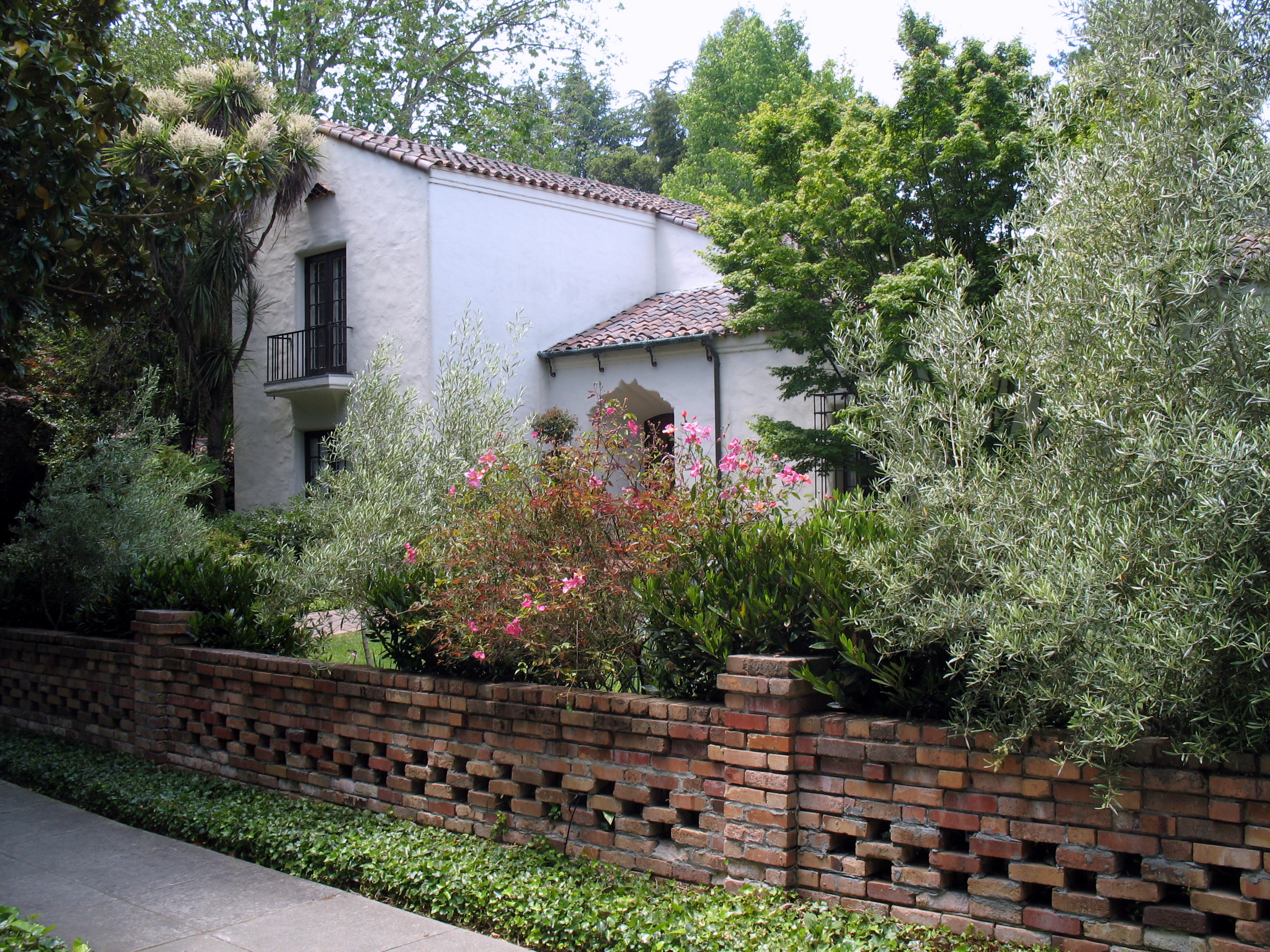
- The Dunker House in 2012

- Location within California
- Location: 420 Maple Street, Palo Alto, California
- Coordinates: 37°27′31″N 122°08′58″W
- Area: 0.8 acres (0.32 ha)
- Built: 1926
- Architect: Birge M. Clark
- Architectural style: Spanish Colonial Revival
- NRHP reference No.: 82002264
- Added to NRHP: February 19, 1982

The Dunker House is a historic house in Palo Alto, California. The property has been listed on the National Register of Historic Places since February 19, 1982.

== History ==
It was built in 1926 for John Dunker and his wife, who were "prominent Palo Alto citizens." The house was designed by architect Birge Clark in the Spanish Colonial Revival style. It was "one of the first two houses" to be designed in this style in Palo Alto. The Dunkers hired Leslie Kiler, a relative, to design the grounds. It was built by Wells P. Goodenough. The property measures 178.38 by 150 feet.

== See also ==
- National Register of Historic Places listings in Santa Clara County, California
