= Lou Henry Hoover House =

Historic house in California, United States

- U.S. National Register of Historic Places
- U.S. National Historic Landmark
- California Historical Landmark
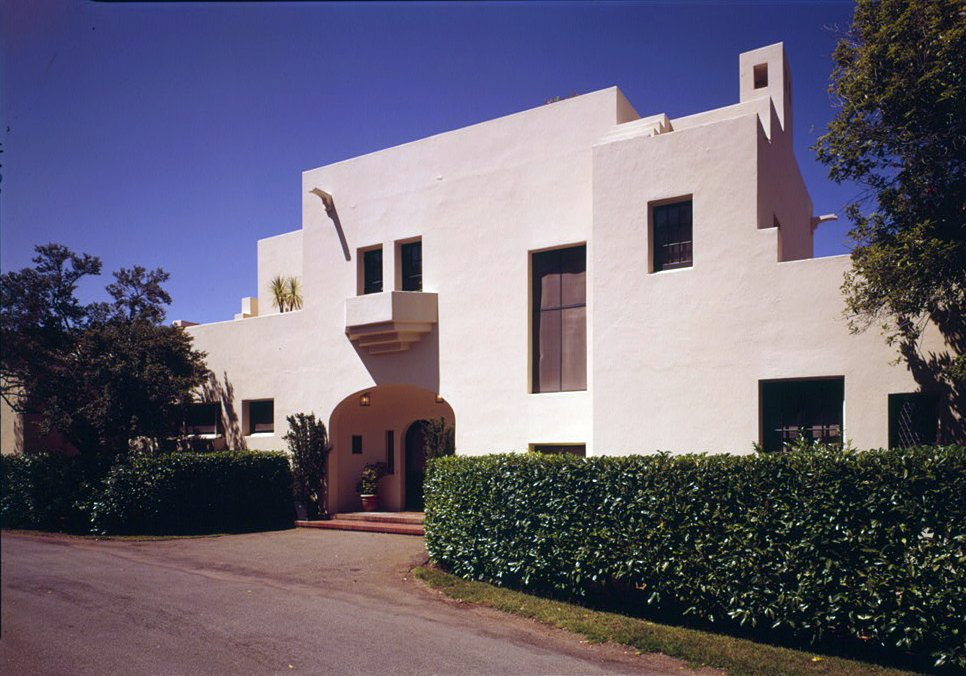
- View of the house from the northwest

- Location within California Location within the United States
- Location: Stanford University, Stanford, California
- Coordinates: 37°25′3.76″N 122°10′7.96″W
- Area: 2.1 acres (0.85 ha)
- Built: 1920
- Architect: Lou Henry Hoover
- Architectural style: International/Mission Revival
- NRHP reference No.: 78000786
- CHISL No.: 913

Significant dates
- Added to NRHP: January 30, 1978
- Designated NHL: February 4, 1985
- Designated CHISL: October 14, 1977

The Hoover House, formally known as the Lou Henry Hoover House or the Lou Henry and Herbert Hoover House, is a historic house located on the campus of Stanford University in Stanford, California, United States. Completed in 1920, it was designed by Lou Henry Hoover, who lived there with her husband Herbert Hoover, 31st president of the United States. It is now the official home of the president of Stanford. In addition to its importance as a residence of the Hoovers, the house is a significant early example of the International Style of architecture. It was designated a National Historic Landmark in 1985.

== History ==
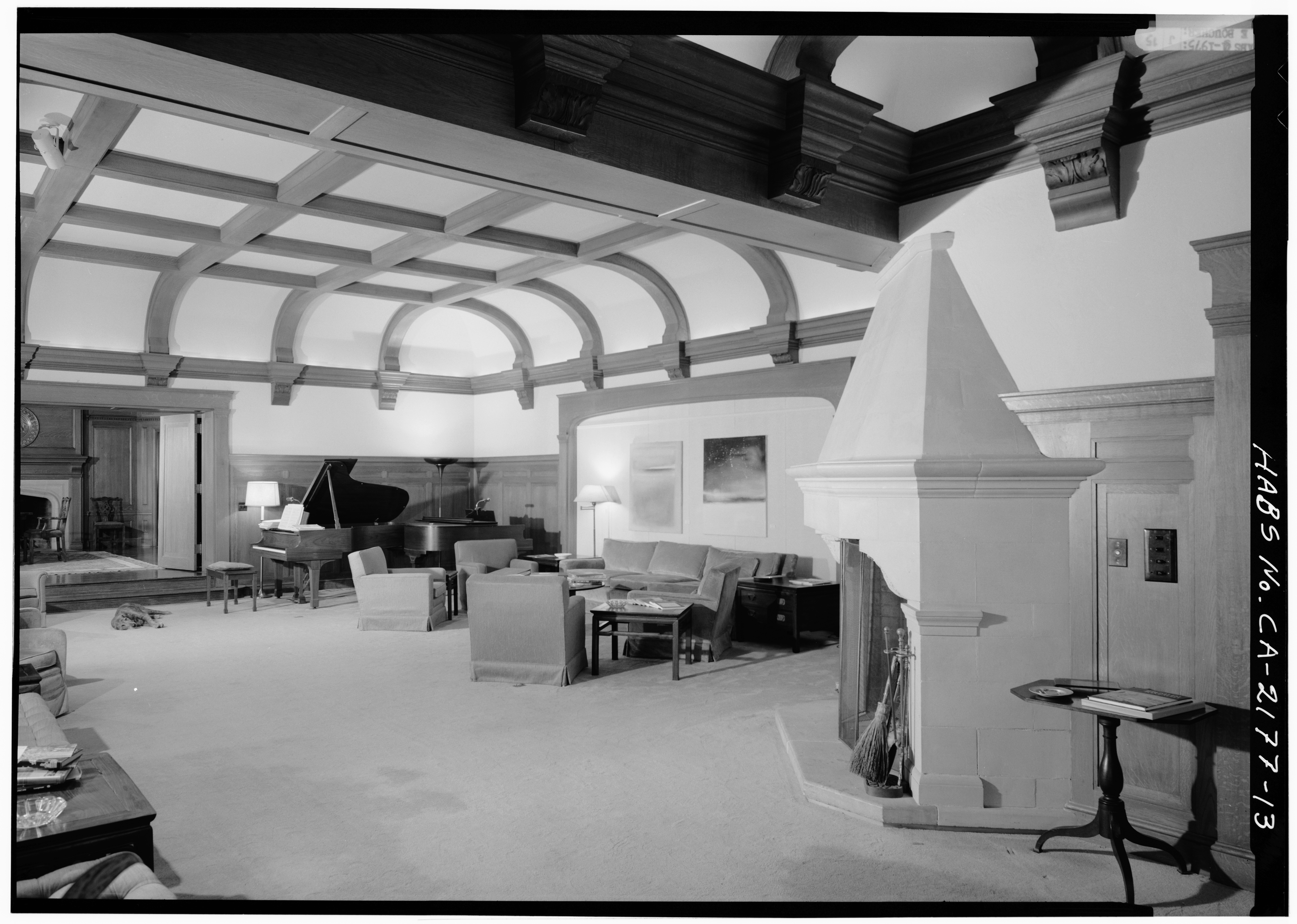
Interior of the house circa 1933

Prior to the end of World War I, the Hoovers had commissioned architect Louis Christian Mullgardt to design their Stanford home; however, Mullgardt publicized his appointment prior to the end of the war, angering the Hoovers, who felt that it was an inopportune time in the waning months of a terrible conflict to announce the construction of a large home. Mullgardt was summarily dismissed.

After several consultations the Hoovers convinced Arthur Bridgman Clark, a Stanford art professor who practiced freelance architecture during the summer, to be their architect. Clark agreed on the condition that Mrs. Hoover design the house and that Clark, aided by architectural draftsman Charles Davus and Clark's architect son, Birge, would serve in an advisory capacity. Mrs. Hoover sketched ideas, watching construction, but when anyone told her that any of her architectural ideas weren't done, she responded, "Well, it's time someone did."

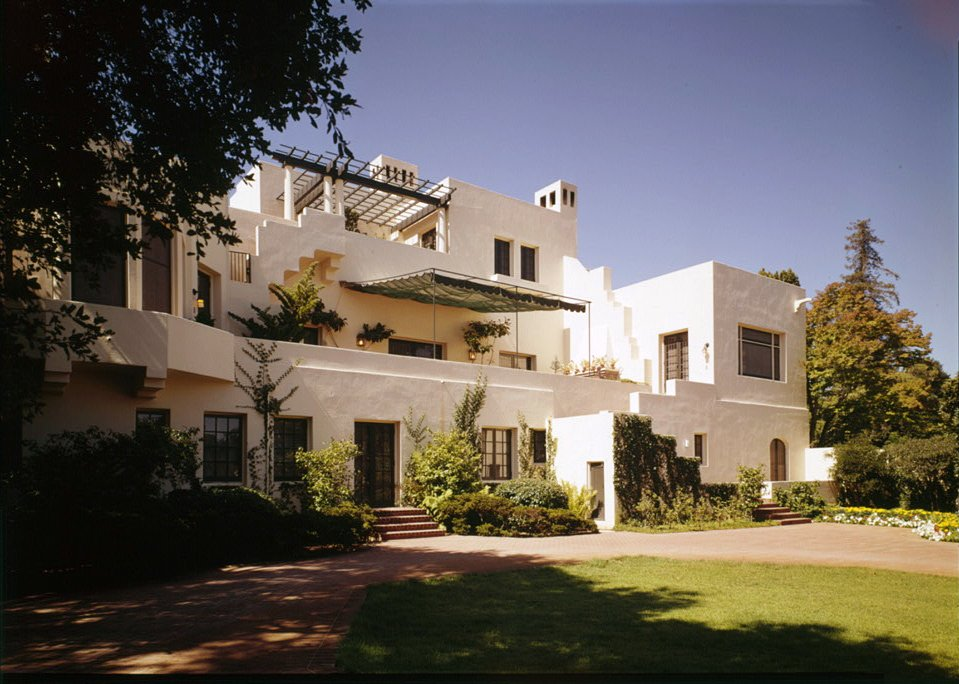
View of the house from the east

The exterior of the house appears much smaller than would be suggested by its interior. This is achieved thanks to the hillside site with the house disappearing into the slope of San Juan Hill. The irregularly shaped house was built on a reinforced concrete slab foundation and rises two stories in the front and three stories in the rear. Resembling early International style homes, it was the opinion of some architects that Mrs. Hoover's designs were modeled after North African Algerian homes she had seen. Elements of Mission Revival Style architecture can also be found in its design and others have seen Pueblo influence.

Herbert Hoover's contribution was to order that the home be fireproof, and the walls were constructed of hollow tiles. Built from 1919 to 1920, the house was the couple's first and only permanent residence. The Hoovers lived there only a short time before Herbert was appointed Secretary of Commerce by President Warren G. Harding in 1921, a role he continued under President Calvin Coolidge. It was here that Hoover awaited the presidential election returns in 1928, when he won against Alfred E. Smith, and 1932, when he lost the election to Franklin D. Roosevelt. During Hoover's presidency (1929–33), the Hoover family only made brief visits to their Stanford home. They returned to this house after 1932, while maintaining a New York apartment as a second residence.

After Lou's death in 1944, her husband deeded the house to Stanford University to serve as a home for university professors. It now serves as the official residence of the university president and is not open to the public.

In 2008 it was fitted with solar panels.

== See also ==
- List of residences of presidents of the United States
