= Mayfield Brewery =

Brewery in Mayfield, California

- Mayfield Railroad Brewery
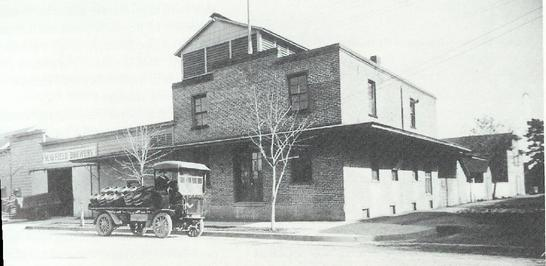
- The Mayfield Brewery

- Location in Santa Clara County
- 37°25′38″N 122°8′37″W
- Location: California Avenue and Birch Street, Palo Alto, California

The Mayfield Brewery also known as the Mayfield Railroad Brewery was a brewery that operated in Mayfield, California, for over 50 years, between 1868 and 1920. The brewery was located at what is now the corner of California Avenue and Birch Street in Palo Alto, California. It produced steam beer and sold it in kegs to local saloons. The brewery was shut down by Prohibition.

== History ==
=== Kleinclaus's brewery ===
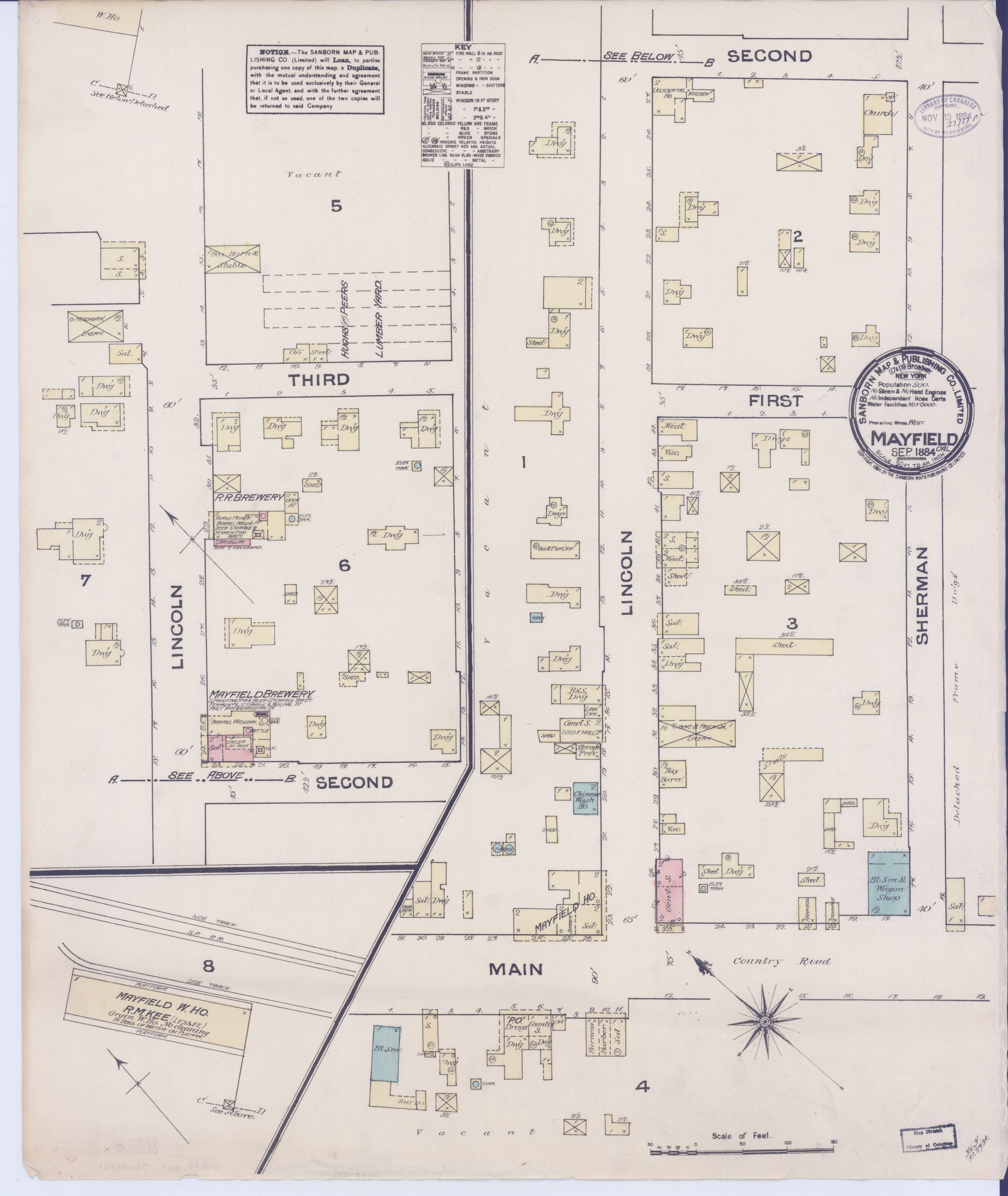
Sanborn Fire Insurance Map showing Mayfield Brewery

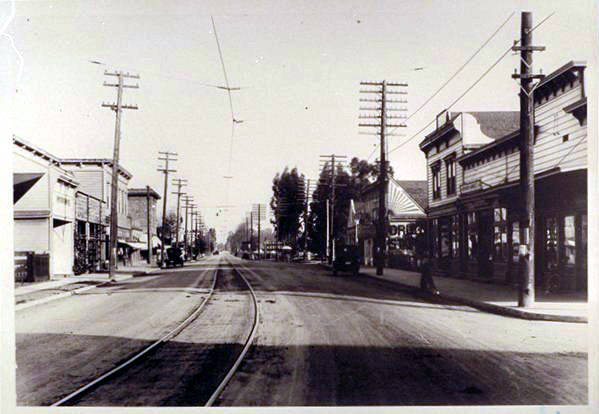
Mayfield Street Scene

The Mayfield Railroad Brewery was started in 1868 in Mayfield, California (later annexed by Palo Alto) by Michel Kleinclaus. The brewery was started on Lincoln Street near Third (now California Ave. and Park Blvd.) but was soon moved to the corner of Second and Lincoln (now California Ave. and Birch St.). The building on Lincoln measured 40 ft (12 m) by 60 ft (18 m) and did an annual business handling approximately one thousand barrels.

At some point the brewery dropped "Railroad" from the name to become The Mayfield Brewery. Mayfield built a blacksmith shop, a drugstore, a livery stable, and a brewery. Its reputation as a place where alcohol was readily available included the Mayfield Brewery.

=== Christopher Ducker's brewery ===
In 1871, Christopher Ducker bought the brewery from Kleinclaus. Ducker, a local merchant who was also running a saloon with his brother Henry, would go on to become a prominent citizen of Mayfield and a member of Mayfield's first board of trustees when the town incorporated in 1903. For many of the years of Ducker's tenure as owner of the brewery, Mayfield came under pressure to become a dry town and close its saloons. Mayfield had missed out on becoming Stanford University's service town because the town refused to close its saloons when Leland Stanford asked them in 1886. Palo Alto was later formed and prospered as a dry university town while Mayfield maintained its image as a rowdy drinking town. In 1904, soon after the town had incorporated, the town's board of trustees voted to become dry. Chris Ducker, a member of the founding board, was the lone dissenting vote. But, by a thin margin and with much debate, the board later voted to grant The Mayfield Brewery a special wholesale license to continue operating.

Ducker ran the brewery, sometimes with business partner Leonard Distel, until 1906 when he retired. Ernest Klevesahl bought the brewery from Ducker in 1906. Around 2005, a salon moved into the space and in 2015, the salon's space was split in half and shared with a wine bar. The salon's space was split in half and shared with a wine bar.
