= MacFarland House (Stanford, California) =

Historic house in California, United States

- U.S. National Register of Historic Places
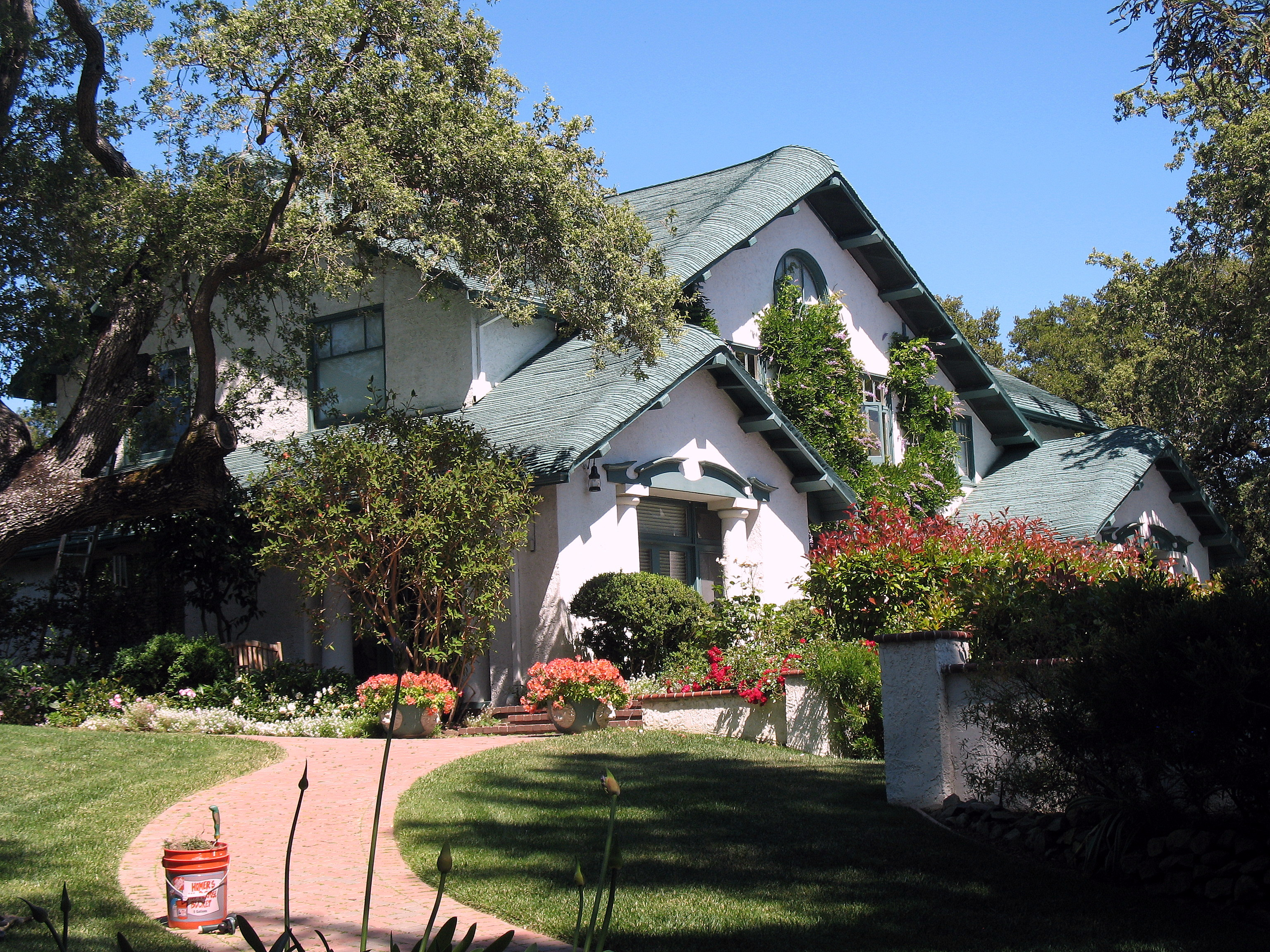
- The house in 2012

- Location within San Francisco Bay Area Location within California
- Location: 775 Santa Ynez Street, Stanford, California
- Coordinates: 37°24′59″N 122°10′10″W
- Area: 1 acre (0.40 ha)
- Built: 1914
- Architect: Arthur Bridgman Clark
- Architectural style: Bungalow/craftsman, Classical Revival
- NRHP reference No.: 06000659
- Added to NRHP: July 21, 2006

The MacFarland House is a historic house in Stanford, California. It was built in 1914 for Frank M. MacFarland, a professor of histology at Stanford University. MacFarland was also the president of the California Academy of Sciences from 1934 to 1946. He lived here with his wife, née Olive Knowles Hornbrook, and died in 1951.

The house was designed by architect Arthur Bridgman Clark in the American Craftsman style, with Classical Revival features. It has been listed on the National Register of Historic Places since July 21, 2006.
