= Ray Lyman Wilbur =

American educator, physician, and politician

Ray Wilbur
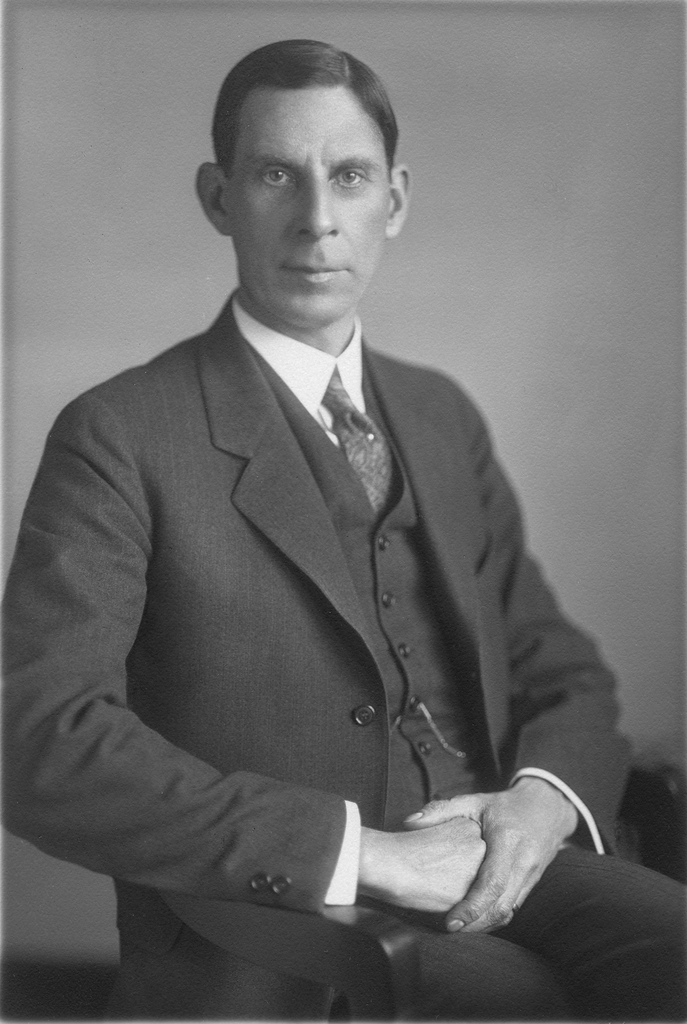

3rd President of Stanford University
- In office January 22, 1916 – June 30, 1943 (Note: Robert E. Swain served as acting president during Wilbur's term as Secretary of the Interior from March 5, 1929 to March 4, 1933.)
- Preceded by: John Casper Branner
- Succeeded by: Donald Tresidder

31st United States Secretary of the Interior
- In office March 5, 1929 – March 4, 1933
- President: Herbert Hoover
- Preceded by: Roy West
- Succeeded by: Harold L. Ickes

Personal details
- Born: Ray Lyman Wilbur; April 13, 1875 Boonesboro, Iowa, U.S.
- Died: June 26, 1949 (aged 74) Stanford, California, U.S.
- Resting place: Alta Mesa Memorial Park
- Party: Republican
- Spouse: Marguerite Blake (m. 1898; died 1946)
- Children: 5, including Blake and Dwight
- Education: Stanford University (BA, MA); University of California, San Francisco (MD)

Ray Lyman Wilbur (April 13, 1875 – June 26, 1949) was an American medical doctor who served as the third president of Stanford University from 1916 to 1943 and as the 31st United States Secretary of the Interior from 1929 to 1933 under President Herbert Hoover.

== Early and personal life ==
Wilbur was born in Boonesboro, Iowa, the son of attorney and businessman Dwight Locke Wilbur and the former Edna Maria Lyman. He was raised with a brother, Curtis D. Wilbur, who served as the U.S. Secretary of the Navy under President Calvin Coolidge, and was a Chief Justice of the Supreme Court of California. The Wilbur family moved to Riverside, California, when Ray Lyman was twelve.

Wilbur graduated from Riverside High School, then studied at Stanford University, receiving a B.A. degree in 1896 and an M.A. degree in 1897. He then studied at Cooper Medical College in San Francisco (then of the University of California, San Francisco, now the medical school of Stanford), receiving a Doctor of Medicine degree in 1899.

While a freshman at his Stanford home, Wilbur met future President Herbert Hoover, who was drumming up business on campus for a local laundry. The two men became lifelong friends.

On December 5, 1898, Wilbur married the former Marguerite May Blake, who was a college friend of Lou Hoover, Herbert Hoover's wife. The couple had five children (Jessica Wilbur Ely, Blake Colburn Wilbur, Dwight Locke Wilbur, Lois Wilbur Hopper, and Ray Lyman Wilbur, Jr.). Marguerite Wilbur died on December 24, 1946, at age 71.

== Stanford University ==
Wilbur first became a member of Stanford's faculty in 1896, as an instructor in physiology. In 1900, Wilbur was made an assistant professor while simultaneously carrying on a busy medical practice. He was the only physician in the university community.

From 1903 to 1909, Wilbur practiced medicine full-time. In 1909, he became a professor of medicine and in 1911 was named dean of the new Stanford University School of Medicine, located at the former Cooper Medical College, where Wilbur had received his M.D. degree. He served as the dean until 1916.

In 1916, he was chosen to serve as president of Stanford and continued in that position until 1943, including during his tenure as Secretary of the Interior. Upon his inauguration as its president, he said that he intended to devote the rest of his life to Stanford, and he did. From his retirement as president in 1943 until his death in 1949, he served as the University's chancellor. During World War I, Wilbur served as a chief of the conservation division of the United States Food Administration. While at the USFA, he coined the slogan "Food Will Win the War."

Wilbur reorganized graduate education, established the Lower Division, introduced Independent Study, and regrouped academic departments within the Schools of the University. He launched the Stanford Graduate School of Business and the Food Research Institute. Among his most notable stances while at Stanford were his opposition to fraternities and to automobiles on campus.

Wilbur served as the President of the American Medical Association from 1923 to 1924. In 1923, he was one of the doctors called in to consult when President Warren G. Harding fell ill in San Francisco, and was present at his deathbed. His son, Dwight Locke Wilbur, later followed in his footsteps as President of the AMA from 1968 until 1969. Wilbur belonged to several private men's clubs, including the Bohemian Club, the Pacific-Union Club, the Commonwealth Club and the University Club in San Francisco.

When the California Legislature established the State Park Commission in 1927, Wilbur was named to the original commission, along with Major Frederick Russell Burnham, W. F. Chandler, William Edward Colby, and Henry W. O'Melveny.

== Secretary of the Interior ==
On March 5, 1929, President Hoover nominated Wilbur as the U.S. Secretary of the Interior confirmed by the Senate, and assumed office the same day. His tenure ended on March 4, 1933, as Hoover left office.

As Interior Secretary, Wilbur addressed corruption in granting contracts for naval oil reserves, which had caused controversy during the Harding administration's Teapot Dome scandal. Wilbur promulgated a policy that no new oil leases would be granted to private individuals except when mandated by law.

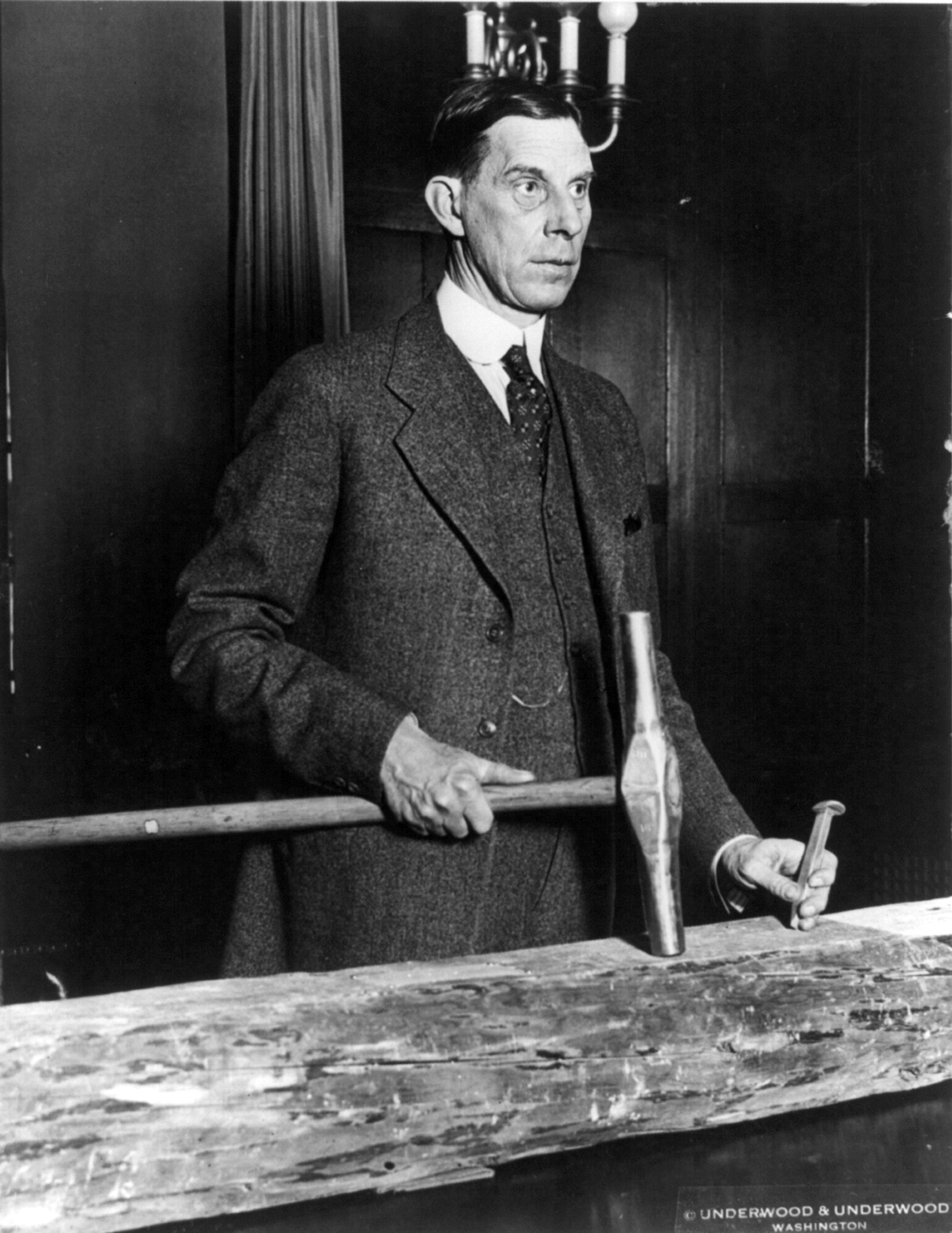
Wilbur visits Boulder Dam (c. 1930)

Wilbur was criticized by political opponents for his allocation of power from Boulder Dam to private utilities. Opponents also criticized him for renaming the dam Hoover Dam.

Wilbur took a particular interest in Native Americans while in office and reorganized the department's Bureau of Indian Affairs. He assisted Native Americans in working to become more self-reliant.

== New Deal critic ==
After leaving the Department of the Interior in 1933, Wilbur became a vocal critic of Franklin D. Roosevelt's New Deal and was the leading champion of "rugged individualism".

He wrote: "It is common talk that every individual is entitled to economic security. The only animals and birds I know that have economic security are those that have been domesticated—and the economic security they have is controlled by the barbed-wire fence, the butcher's knife and the desire of others. They are milked, skinned, egged or eaten up by their protectors."

== Death and legacy ==
Wilbur died of heart disease at his Stanford campus home on June 26, 1949, at age 74. He is buried at Alta Mesa Memorial Park in Palo Alto, California. Hoover eulogized him as "my devoted friend and constant friend since boyhood." He said of Wilbur: "During all his years, including his later chancellorship of Stanford, he has given a multitude of services to the people. Public health and education have been enriched over all these years from his sane statesmanship and rugged intellectual honesty. America is a better place for his having lived in it."

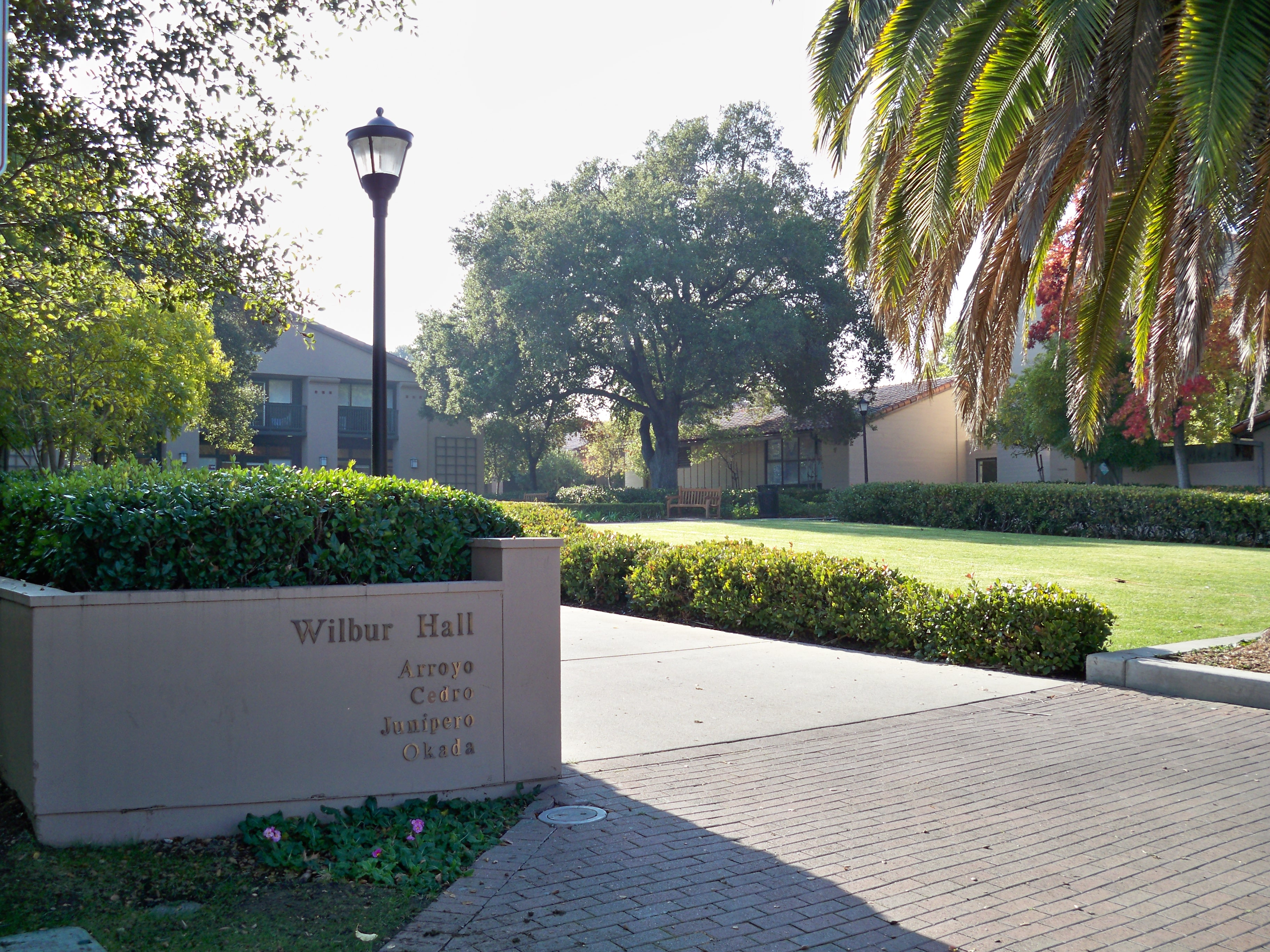
Wilbur Hall, a student residence on the Stanford University campus.

A dormitory complex at Stanford University is named after Wilbur.

== Notes ==
Academic offices
| Preceded by John C. Branner | President of Stanford University; 1916–1943 | Succeeded by Donald B. Tresidder |
Political offices
| Preceded by Roy O. West | U.S. Secretary of the Interior; Served under: Herbert Hoover; March 5, 1929–March 4, 1933 | Succeeded by Harold L. Ickes |
