= Norris House =

Historic house in California, United States

- U.S. National Register of Historic Places
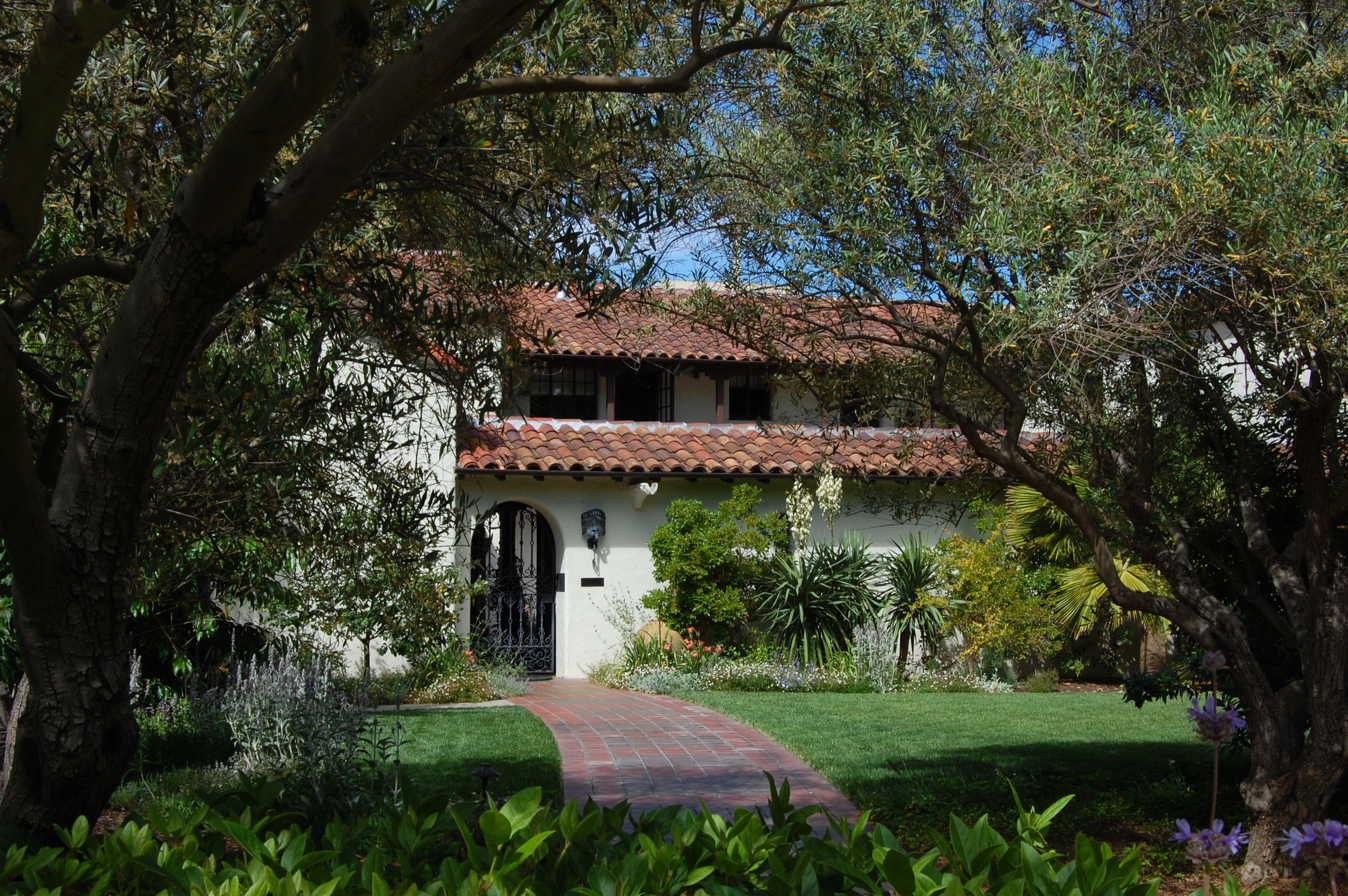

- Location within California Location within the United States
- Location: 1247 Cowper St., Palo Alto, California
- Coordinates: 37°26′33″N 122°8′57″W
- Area: less than one acre
- Built: 1927
- Built by: Goodenough, Wells
- Architect: Clark, Birge
- Architectural style: Spanish Colonial Revival
- NRHP reference No.: 80000859
- Added to NRHP: July 24, 1980

The Norris House is a historic house located at 1247 Cowper St. in Palo Alto, California. The house was built in 1927 for Kathleen Norris, a novelist and columnist who was once the highest-paid female author in the United States, and her husband Charles Gilman Norris, also a noted novelist. Kathleen Norris' novels featured female characters who represented her ideals of motherhood and moral virtue; her columns appeared in major magazines and included both short stories and advice columns. Charles Gilman Norris wrote novels which touched on contemporary social issues and served as Kathleen's agent.

In 1949, the Diocese of San Francisco purchased the house to serve as the Newman Center for Stanford University. Around 2000 the house was sold into private hands again.

Architect Birge Clark designed the Spanish Colonial Revival house. At the time, the house was Clark's largest and most expensive design. The house's layout features several one- and two-story sections surrounding a patio. The house is built from white stucco with a tile roof; handcrafted ironwork and woodwork is used in the beams and decorations.

The house was added to the National Register of Historic Places on July 24, 1980.
