= Mayfield, California =

Town in Santa Clara County, California, United States

Mayfield
- Mayfield Farm
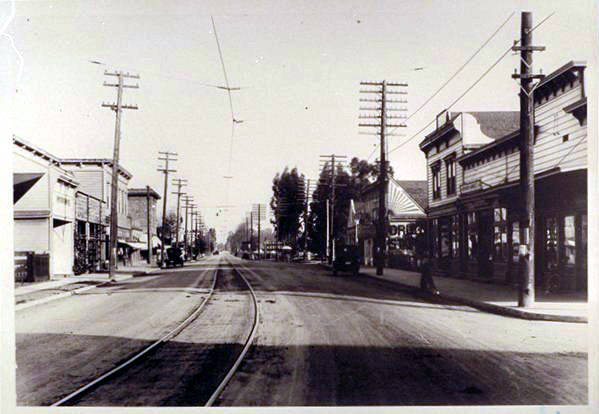
- Mayfield Street Scene, ca. 1909

- Location in Santa Clara County
- 37°24′57″N 122°7′50″W
- Location: 3899 La Selva Drive, Palo Alto, California, US

History
- Founded: 1853
- Founder: Elisha Oscar Crosby

California Historical Landmark
- Official name: Homesite of Sarah Wallis Mayfield Farm
- Designated: October 11, 1986
- Reference no.: 969

Mayfield was a historic town in Santa Clara County, California. It was one of the oldest towns, predating the establishment of nearby Palo Alto and Stanford University. In 1853, prior to its becoming a town, Elisha Oscar Crosby acquired a 250 acres (1.0 km^{2}) parcel of land, which was named Mayfield Farm. This property later changed hands on September 23, 1856, when it was transferred to Sarah Wallis to settle a debt Crosby owed her. The name "Mayfield" subsequently became associated with the community nearby. The historical significance of Mayfield is now marked by California Historical Landmark #969, which designates the location of Wallis's first residence, the Mayfield Farm.

== History ==
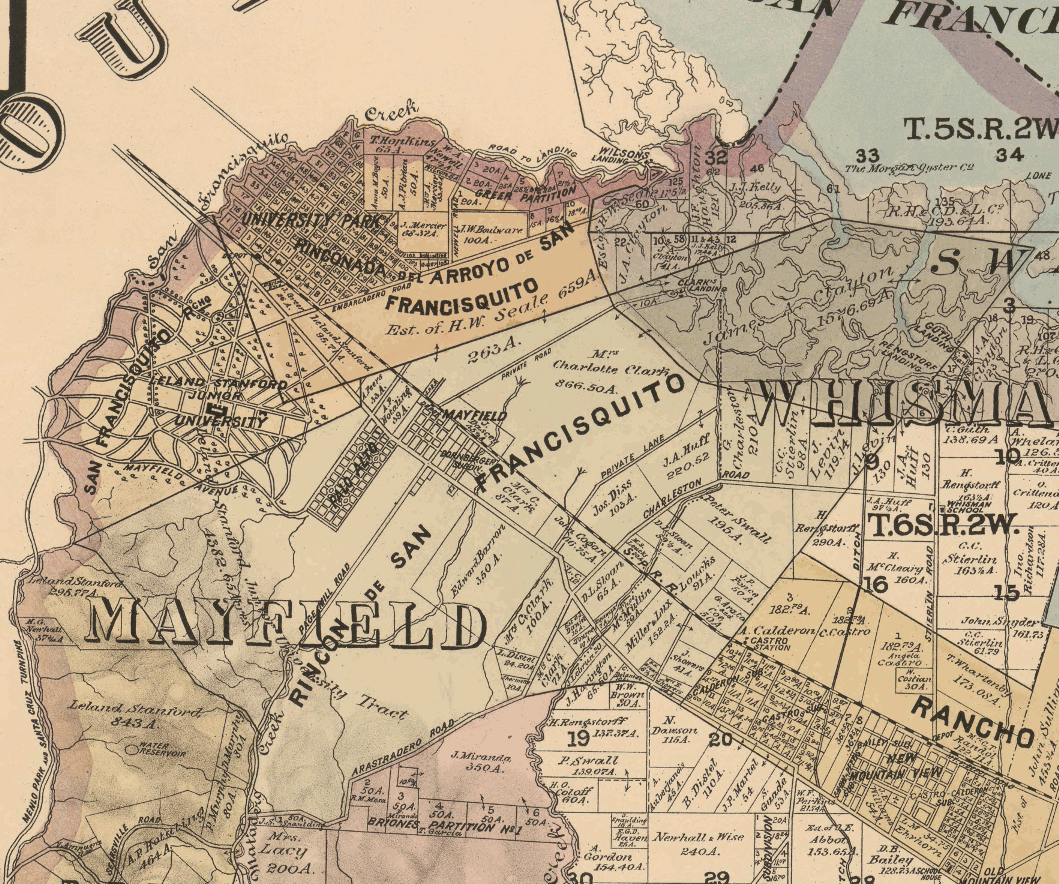
Mayfield on 1890 map of northern Santa Clara County. Note the property due south labelled as owned by Edward Barron; this was the original Mayfield farm.

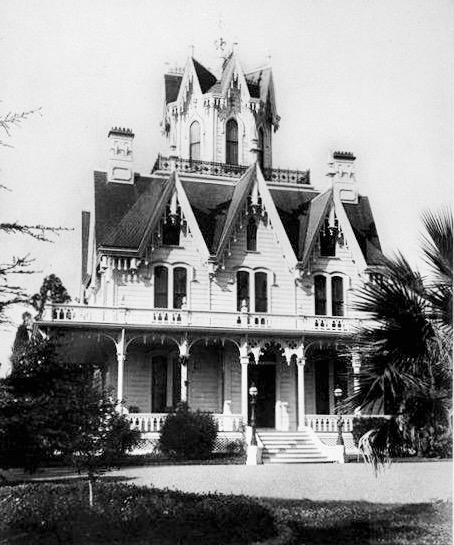
"Wedding Cake" residence built by Sarah Wallis and her husband in 1856.

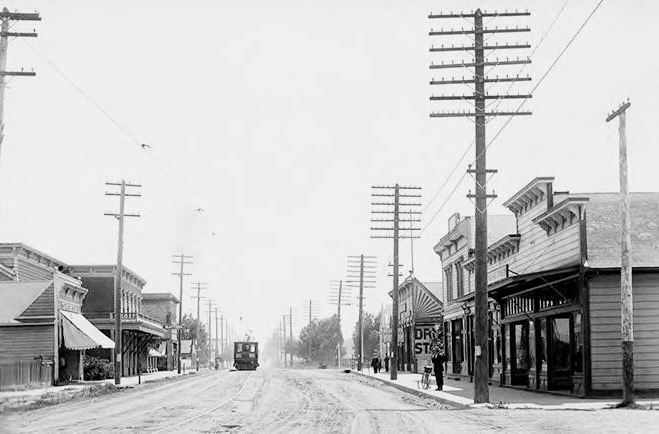
Mayfield's Main Street view (current day, El Camino Real) with trolley car in background.

On April 10, 1853, Elisha Oscar Crosby, a former New York lawyer residing in San Jose, bought 250 acres (1.0 km^{2}) of the Rancho Rincon de San Francisquito from the Secundino and his brother Teodoro Robles for $2,000 (equivalent to $77,400 in 2025). He called his new property Mayfield Farm. Mayfield began as a town in 1853 about one mile north of Mayfield Farm. A public house was constructed by James Otterson. It was the site of a stagecoach stop, inn, and a saloon known as "Uncle Jim's Cabin" near the intersection of El Camino Real and today's California Avenue in what is now southern Palo Alto. In 1855, Uncle Jim's Cabin had evolved into a mail stop, with Otterson assuming the role of postmaster. Otterson is credited with proposing the name "Mayfield." As time passed, Mayfield transformed into a village, complete with a blacksmith shop, a general store, a butcher shop, a cobbler's shop, and its first school.

On September 23, 1856, Sarah Armstrong Wallis (1825-1905) bought Crosby's Mayfield Farm (now comprising the present-day Barron Park) to satisfy a debt Crosby owed her. She and her husband settled there and built a two-story Gingerbread Victorian-style mansion, where they raised five children. Wallis became the founding president of the Mayfield Women's suffrage Association in 1870 and the California State Woman Suffrage Educationa Association in 1873.

Mayfield experienced a gradual population growth, primarily consisting of long-standing locals and native inhabitants. The Mayfield School district was a building that provided grammar school grades. The Mayfield churches included a Catholic church of St. Aloysius and a Methodist Episcopal Church. Many of the houses in Mayfield did not have street numbers. The 1860s brought more residents and businesses to Mayfield. Hotels, a drugstore, another blacksmith shop, a livery stable, a lumber yard, and a brewery. Farms grew wheat, barley, celery, onions, and strawberries. Mayfield had its own newspaper by 1869, called the Mayfield Enterprise, (in English and Spanish). The town incorporated in 1903, and had breweries and a cannery.

Wallis invested in the San Francisco and San Jose Railroad and persuaded the city to have a station, now the California Avenue station in Palo Alto. In October 1863 the San Francisco and San Jose Railroad had been built as far as Mayfield and service started between San Francisco and Mayfield. After suffering financial losses, the Wallis’ sold Mayfield Farm in 1878 to Edward Barron.

The Mayfield Brewery also known as the Mayfield Railroad Brewery was a brewery that started in Mayfield in 1868. The brewery was located at what is now the corner of California Avenue and Birch Street in Palo Alto, California. It produced beer and sold it in kegs to local saloons. The brewery was shut down by Prohibition.

In 1903, a delegation representing Mayfield approached the county Board of Supervisors to seek incorporation. The board granted approval in May, and in July, the residents of Mayfield voted decisively in favor of incorporation, with a vote tally of 102 to 26. As a result, Arthur Bridgman Clark, a distinguished professor of art at Stanford University, was appointed as the first mayor.

On July 2, 1925, Palo Alto voters approved the annexation of Mayfield and the two communities were officially consolidated on July 6, 1925 in a vote 1,094 to 441. As a result Palo Alto has two downtown areas: one along University Avenue and one along California Avenue (renamed after the annexation since Palo Alto already had a Lincoln Avenue). The Mayfield News wrote its own obituary four days later:

"It is with a feeling of deep regret that we see on our streets today those who would sell, or give, our beautiful little city to an outside community. We have watched Mayfield grow from a small hamlet, when Palo Alto was nothing more than a hayfield, to her present size … and it is with a feeling of sorrow that we contemplate the fact that there are those who would sell or give the city away."

== Landmark status ==
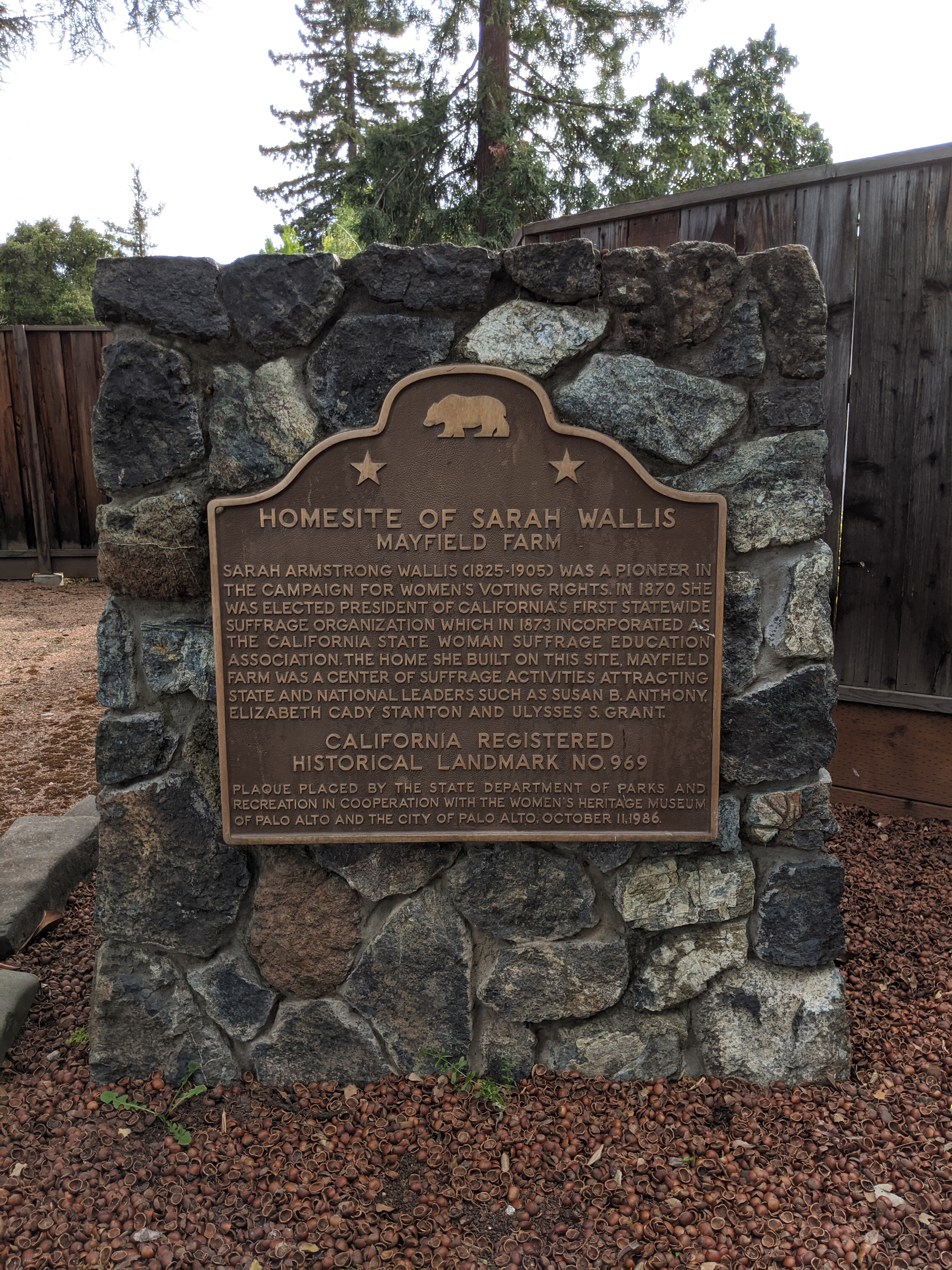
Historical Landmark plaque #969 of Sarah Wallis Mayfield Farm.

On October 11, 1986, the city of Palo Alto, the Women's Heritage Museum of Palo Alto, and the California State Department of Parks and Recreation, erected a commemorative plaque, that designates this site as California Historical Landmark #969, the homesite of the Sarah Wallis Mayfield Farm. The marker is at 3899 La Selva Drive in Palo Alto. The inscription on the plaque reads:

"Sarah Armstrong Wallis (1825–1905) was a pioneer in the campaign for women’s voting rights. In 1870 she was elected president of California’s first statewide suffrage organization which in 1873 incorporated as the California State Woman Suffrage Education Association. The home she built on this site, Mayfield Farm, was a center of suffrage activities attracting state and national leaders such as Susan B. Anthony, Elizabeth Cady Stanton and Ulysses S. Grant."

== See also ==
- California Historical Landmarks in Santa Clara County
- List of cities and towns in the San Francisco Bay Area
