= Palo Alto Medical Foundation =

Not-for-profit healthcare organization in the San Francisco Bay Area

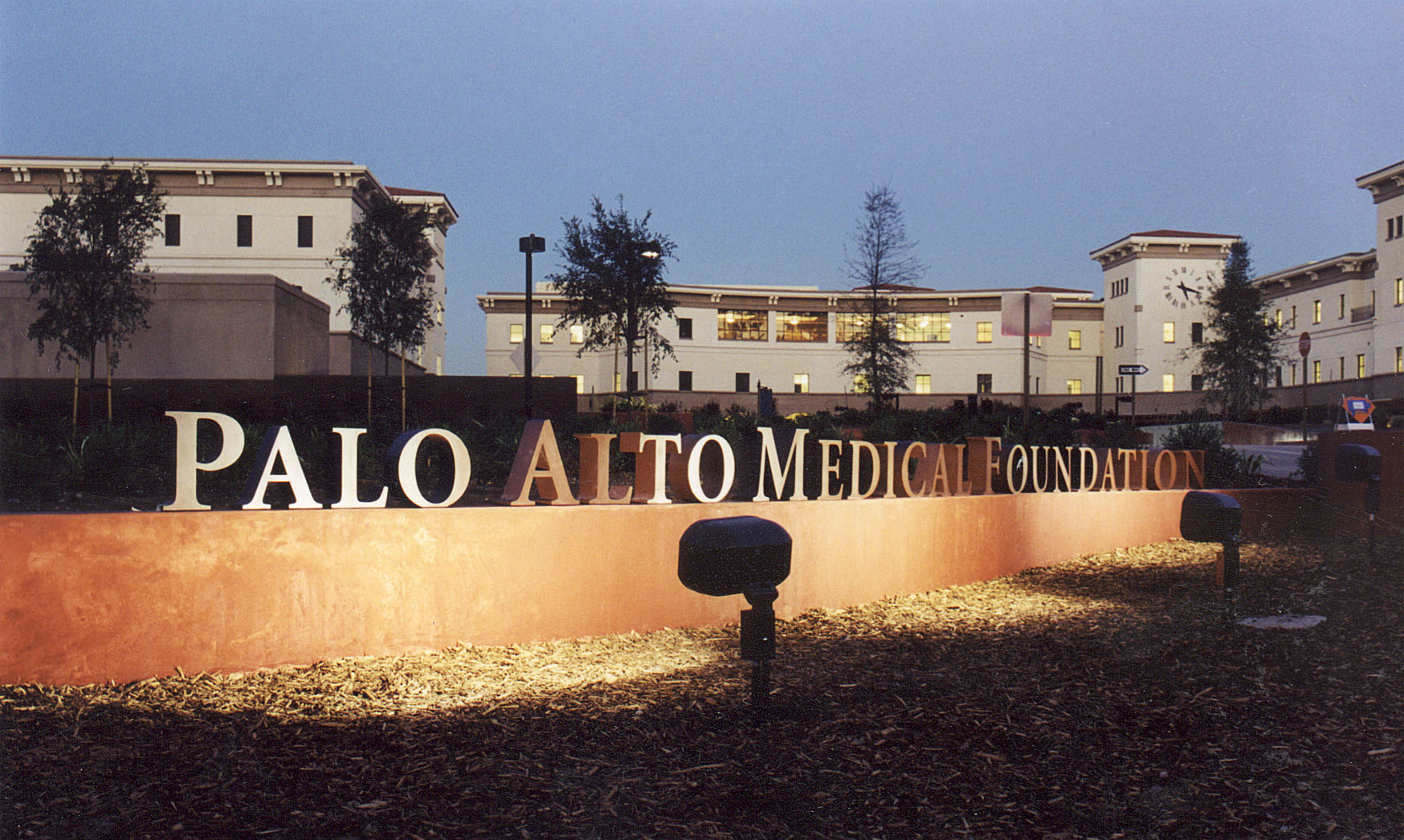
- Formation: 1930
- Founder: Dr. Russel Van Arsdale Lee
- Type: Nonprofit
- Tax ID no.: 94-1156581
- Location: Palo Alto, California, United States
- Services: Healthcare
- Parent organization: Sutter Health
- Website: https://www.sutterhealth.org/pamf

The Palo Alto Medical Foundation for Health Care, Research, and Education (PAMF) is a not-for-profit health care organization with medical offices in more than 15 cities in the Bay Area. It has more than 900 physicians and had over 2 million patient visits in 2008.

== History ==
The history of the group dates back to 1930, when Dr. Russel Van Arsdale Lee founded the Palo Alto Medical Clinic (PAMC). Within a few years, several physicians joined Dr. Lee, including Edward F. Roth, Blake C. Wilbur, Herbert Niebel, Milton Saier, and Esther Clark, one of the first female physicians in the country. In 1946—before health plans were standard business—PAMC agreed to provide medical care to nearby Stanford University students in exchange for a flat fee. In 1950, it became one of the first facilities in the nation to offer radiation therapy for cancer patients in an outpatient setting.

In 1981, the for-profit physician group PAMC created the not-for-profit PAMF to control its operations and assets, and in 1993, PAMF became an affiliate of Sutter Health, a not-for-profit organization with hospitals and medical groups in Northern California. In 2008, PAMF's three medical groups—Camino Medical Group, Palo Alto Medical Clinic, and Santa Cruz Medical Clinic—merged to form a single medical group, Palo Alto Foundation Medical Group (PAFMG). In 2017, the Peninsula Medical Clinic (PMC) of Burlingame joined PAFMG as the Mills Peninsula Division of the medical group.

== Education and research ==
In addition to its Health Care Division, PAMF consists of an Education Division and Research Institute. The Education Division provides classes, lectures, support groups and consultations, and manages PAMF's Community Health Resource Centers located in several Bay Area cities. In 2009, the National Institutes of Health awarded the institute more than $2 million in federal stimulus grants through the American Recovery and Reinvestment Act.

PAMF provides an e-health service that allows patients to view their records and test results from their personal computers, and request appointments and prescription renewals online. In 2008, it launched a pilot program to promote online communication between diabetic patients and their health care providers.

== Awards ==
- In 2009, PAMF was named a top performer by the Integrated Healthcare Association, which ranks California medical groups on clinical quality, patient experience, use of information technology and coordinated diabetes care.
- In 2009, its Chief Medical Information Officer, Dr. Paul Tang, was listed on Modern Healthcare's list of 100 Most Powerful People in Healthcare.
