= Blake Colburn Wilbur =

American physician (1901–1974)

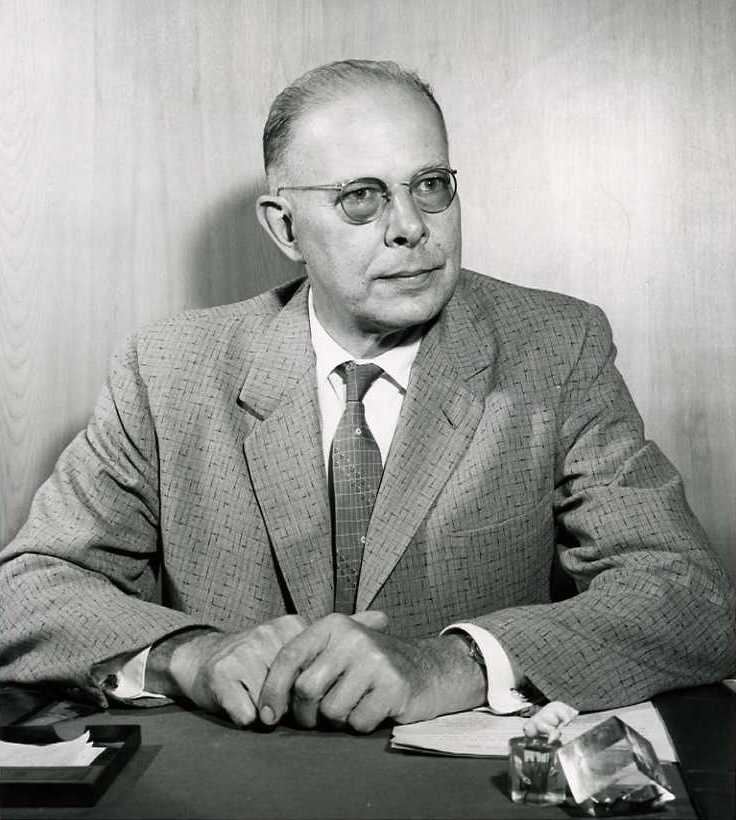
- Born: May 29, 1901; San Francisco, California, US
- Died: March 10, 1974 (aged 72)
- Education: Stanford University; Harvard Medical School
- Occupation: Surgeon
- Spouse: Mary
- Children: 4
- Father: Ray Lyman Wilbur

Blake Colburn Wilbur (May 29, 1901 – March 10, 1974) was a surgeon and one of the co-founders of the Palo Alto Medical Clinic.

== Early life, education and early career ==
Blake Wilbur was born in San Francisco, California to Ray Lyman Wilbur and Marguerite Blake Wilbur. Ray Lyman Wilbur was a medical doctor, third President of Stanford University, President of the AMA and the Association of American Medical Colleges, and the 31st United States Secretary of the Interior. Both of Wilbur's parents studied physiology at Stanford. Marguerite's father, Charles E. Blake and her aunt, Charlotte Blake Brown were both medical doctors. Wilbur's brother, Dwight Locke Wilbur was also a physician.

Wilbur grew up in Palo Alto, California with his sisters, Jessica and Lois and brothers, Dwight and Ray Lyman Jr. He received his first introduction to the medical profession at age 8 accompanying his father in Germany and England who studied under the leading medical scientists of that era. Blake graduated from Palo Alto High School in 1919 and entered Stanford University that fall. He attended summer school at Hopkins Marine Station in Pacific Grove, California and met his future wife, Mary Caldwell Sloan, a Stanford Zoology major there in 1920. Sloan (Nov 9, 1901 – Mar 22, 2002) was the daughter of Mary Brown and Richard Elihu Sloan, a lawyer and American jurist who served as Associate Justice of the Arizona Territorial Supreme Court, a United States District Court judge and as the 17th and final Governor of Arizona Territory.

Wilbur received his AB in Physiology and graduated from Stanford with a Phi Beta Kappa Key in 1922. Wilbur and Sloan were married at Stanford Memorial Chapel June 23, 1923. Wilbur studied medicine at Stanford; however his interest in surgery led him to complete his medical degree at Harvard Medical School. Mary accompanied him to Boston. Wilbur graduated from Harvard in 1925 and interned first at the Collis P. Huntington Memorial Hospital under Dr. George R. Minot in 1925 and then at Presbyterian Hospital, New York in surgery in 1926. After his internship he studied at Mayo Clinic, Rochester, Minnesota, and observed the Dr. William James Mayo, Dr. Charles Horace Mayo and Dr. E. Starr Judd operate.

In 1928 Wilbur and Mary moved back to San Francisco. Wilbur became a surgeon at Southern Pacific Hospital in San Francisco and opened an office at 490 Post Street.

== Palo Alto Medical Clinic ==
In 1928 Palo Alto Doctors Russel Lee, Esther Clark and Fritz Roth asked Wilbur to join them in Palo Alto. Wilbur's medical friends in San Francisco advised against being a "country doctor". But Dr. and Mrs. Lee were persuasive and Wilbur joined them on January 1, 1930. He found himself doing surgery of all kinds, as well as cesarean and ordinary deliveries and general medicine. In the 1930s, Wilbur's patients included Stanford's athletes, including runner, Ben Eastman. He also served as the Team Physician for Stanford's Football Team. The Palo Alto Medical Clinic's practice grew and by World War II the clinic served a large portion of the population between Atherton and Mountain View. Wilbur's practice extended beyond. "Patients would come from Eureka to Fresno to see Dr. Wilbur". (Dr. Lawrence Basso, Interview, May 2011.) During the World War II war years Wilbur was the first to use penicillin on a patient at the Clinic.

In an interview about the early years of PAMC, Lee explained that the founding partners divided up their profits informally. Each person was asked to suggest the amount that he or she deserved for the year, "It had this effect: They were modest about what they put down" Lee added, "The group was greatly helped by the generosity of Dr. Blake Wilbur, who willingly gave up a significant portion of earnings from his lucrative surgical practice to the rest of the group."

Dr. Lawrence Basso joined PAMC in 1970. He described Wilbur as a "360-degree comprehensive doctor. All aspects of his patient's care were important to him." Basso recalled, "Dr. Wilbur was very calm and very consistent. He was unique in that he listened and treated everyone with the same regard: doctor, patient, university president, orderly, it made no difference. In turn, he commanded an enormous respect from all his patients and all the doctors, nurses and staff." He was devoted to his profession. His work was much more than a job; it was his vocation. He was there to help people.(Dr. Lawrence Basso, Interview, May 2011.)

Wilbur typically performed surgery from 7:30 a.m. to 3:30 p.m., and then saw patients in his office until 9 or 10 p.m. Wilbur continued as a practicing surgeon up to the time of his death. He had four surgeries scheduled the day after he died.

== Stanford University School of Medicine ==
In addition to PAMC, Wilbur was a clinical professor at the Stanford Medical School from 1930 to 1966. Even after retiring in 1966, he continued to teach. His students were mostly interns and residents. Surgical interns at Stanford "loved to scrub" with Wilbur. There was always a competition to work with him. When watching him in surgery he made the procedures look so easy. "Watching him operate was like watching a maestro." Wilbur did not say much in surgery, but when he did, the interns knew that it was very profound. (Dr. Phil Sunshine, Interview, Sept. 2011.)

In 1962, there was a vigorous campaign to treat babies in ventilators who had or might suffer respiratory failure. However, feeding the babies in ventilators was difficult, and the doctors were looking for a way to avoid aspiration during feeding (accidental sucking in of food particles or fluids into the lungs). Dr. D. Vernon Thomas approached Wilbur with the idea of inserting a gastrostomy tube in an infant's stomach while the baby was in the ventilator. Wilbur thought about it and agreed to try. The procedure was performed very rapidly and without complications. It was beautiful to watch. Dr. Wilbur placed 3-5 more tubes for the neonatal care division and the procedure was adopted. (Dr. Phil Sunshine, Interview, Sept. 2011.)

== Personal life ==
Blake and his wife, Mary, had four children, Dr. Richard S. Wilbur, Mary I. Harrison, Lorraine C. Dicke and Colburn S. Wilbur and 11 grandchildren.

Wilbur was a Member of the American College of Surgeons, American Medical Association, the California Medical Association, the Pan-Pacific Surgical Association and the San Francisco Surgical Society.

== Legacy ==
There are two scholarship funds in his name at Stanford University: The Russel V. Lee and Blake C. Wilbur Scholarship Fund and the Blake C. Wilbur, M.D. Scholarship Fund. In 1975 Stanford University named Blake Wilbur Drive after him. In 1993 Stanford opened the Blake Wilbur Outpatient Clinic.
