= Bertha Wright =

American nurse

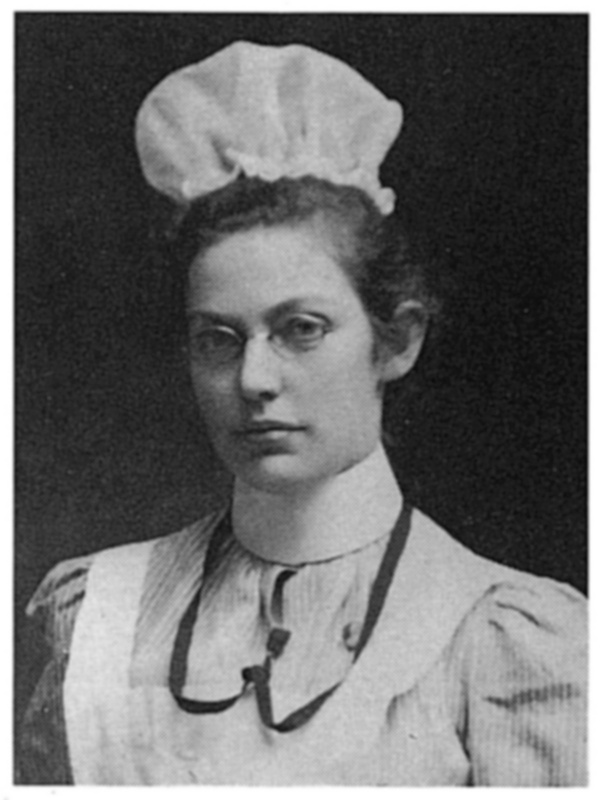
Bertha Wright, 1901 graduation photo, courtesy of Children's Hospital Oakland

Bertha Wright (June 17, 1876 – May 6, 1971) was a pioneering public health nurse, one of the founders of the Baby Hospital, which later became the Children's Hospital Oakland.

== Early life ==
Bertha Wright was born in San Francisco, on June 17, 1876, the daughter of Horatio Nelson Wright (1840–1925) and Frances Allen "Fanny" Cheever (1850–1917).

In 1901 she graduated from the California Women's Hospital School of Nursing in San Francisco.

== Career ==
Bertha Wright was a visiting nurse, and she saw first-hand the need of an hospital dedicated to the caring of children.

She founded the first nursing school in Alameda County. Wright was also an instructor of postgraduate nursing students at University of California, Berkeley. She became involved in many activities that were considered progressive at the time, including advocating for feminism.

When the 1906 Earthquake struck San Francisco, Wright was working at the Children's Hospital at the time. She treated patients at the Army General Hospital at the Presidio and at the temporary tents in Golden Gate Park. Soon after she became the home secretary of the Charitable Organization Society

Under Wright’s support, the Berkeley Day Hospital and Berkeley Clinic provided services to the poorest population. She established the Berkeley Day Nursery, the first public child day care center in California.

In 1909, Mabel Weed replaced Wright as secretary of the Charitable Organization Society, and Wright became the district nurse for the Berkeley Schools.

In 1912, Wright and a group of local women founded the Baby Hospital in Oakland. The Baby Hospital, later to become the Children's Hospital Oakland, opened in 1914 with 38 beds in an old residential building.

== Personal life ==
Bertha Wright and Mabel Weed met when they were both working at the Charity Organization Society in Berkeley. The two women moved in together, and Weed adopted three children: Philip, Alice Barbara and Jean. They also raised a number of foster children together. Wright and Weed moved to Palo Alto, California in 1938, and they fostered several more children from foster care before Wright's death in 1971.
