= Elisha Oscar Crosby =

American politician

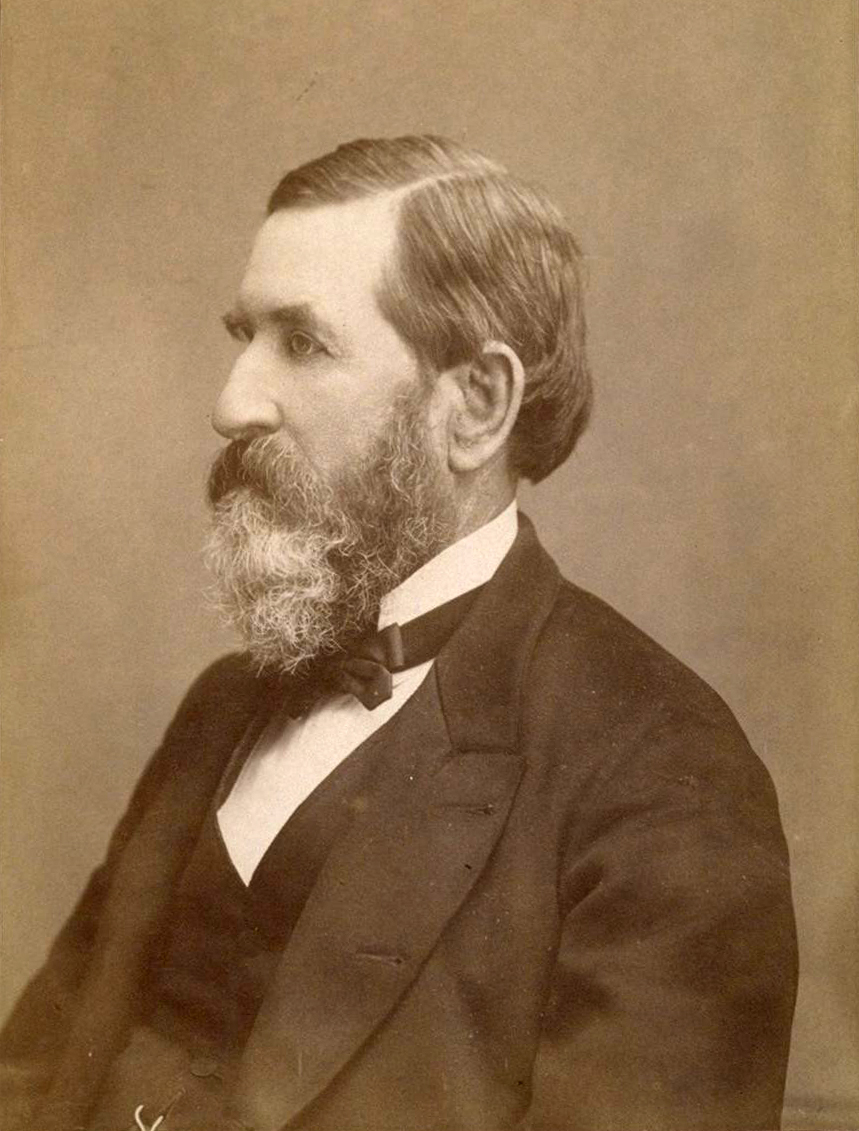
- Crosby in 1886
- Born: July 18, 1818; Ithaca, New York, U.S.
- Died: June 25, 1895 (aged 76); Alameda, California, U.S.
- Occupations: Lawyer, politician, diplomat
- Children: Edward Crosby

Elisha Oscar Crosby (July 18, 1818 - June 25, 1895) was an American lawyer, politician and diplomat. He served as a member of the California State Senate from 1849 to 1852. As a state senator, he served as chair of the Judiciary Committee, and in that capacity prepared the committee report resulting in the enactment of a reception statute by which the newly formed state of California adopted the common law as the basis for its legal system. He served as the United States Minister Resident to Guatemala from 1861 to 1864. By the 1870s, he settled in Alameda, California, where he became a justice of peace.
