= Children's Hospital Oakland =

UCSF Benioff Children's Hospital Oakland
- UCSF

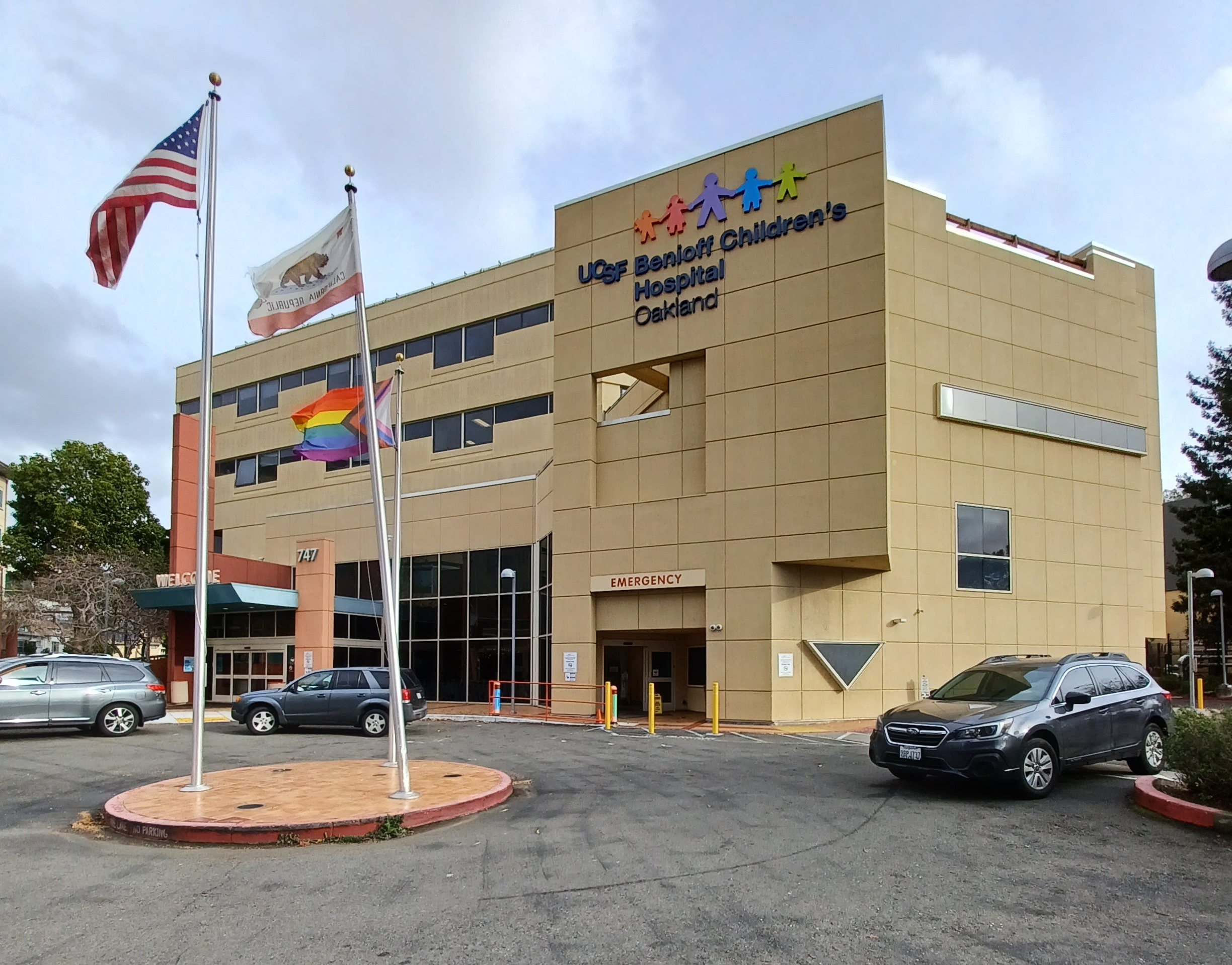

Geography
- Location: Oakland, California, United States
- Coordinates: 37.837492°N 122.267484°W

Organization
- Care system: Non-profit Hospital
- Affiliated university: University of California San Francisco

Services
- Emergency department: Level I Trauma Center
- Beds: 191

Helipads
- Helipad: FAA LID: 7CL1

History
- Founded: 1912

Links
- Website: www.ucsfbenioffchildrens.org
- Lists: Hospitals in California

UCSF Benioff Children's Hospital Oakland, formerly known as Children's Hospital Oakland, is a pediatric acute care hospital located in Oakland, California. The hospital has 191 beds and is affiliated with the UCSF School of Medicine. The hospital provides comprehensive pediatric specialties and subspecialties to infants, children, teens and young adults aged 0–21 throughout Northern California. UCSF Benioff Children's Hospital Oakland also features a Level 1 Pediatric Trauma Center, one of five in the state.

It has an affiliated research organization, the Children's Hospital Oakland Research Institute, or CHORI, and is involved in research and treatment for a variety of children's health issues, such as pediatric obesity, cancers, sickle cell disease, AIDS/HIV, hemophilia and cystic fibrosis.

== History ==
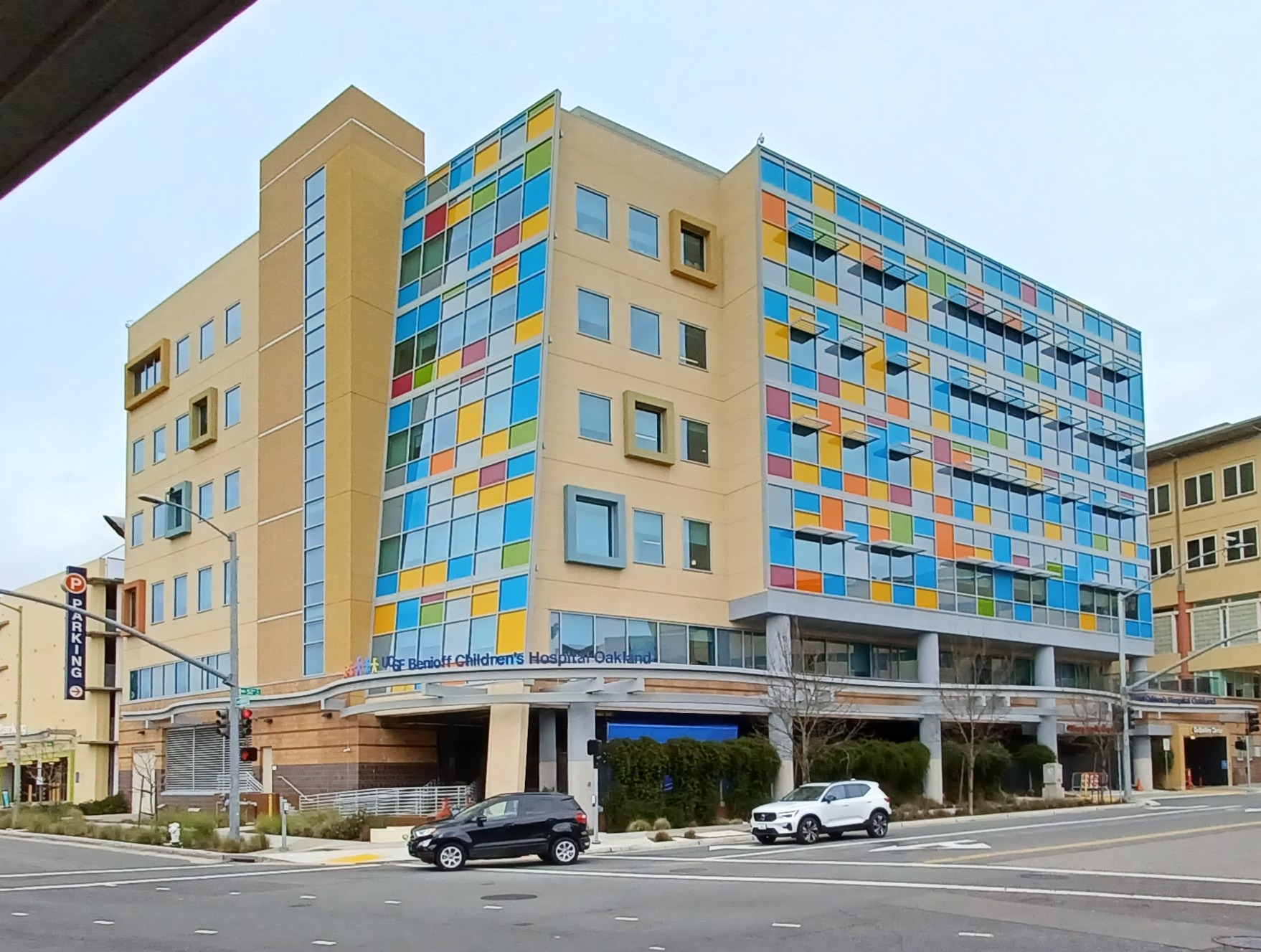
Outpatient center

Bertha Wright founded the Baby Hospital, which later became the Children's Hospital Oakland, in 1912. Previously named Children's Hospital & Research Center Oakland, the hospital was renamed in 2014 after affiliating with UCSF Benioff Children's Hospital San Francisco.

In 2016, the UCSF Children's Hospital was ranked among the top 25 in eight of 10 hospital specialties in the U.S News & World Report's best pediatric hospitals listing.

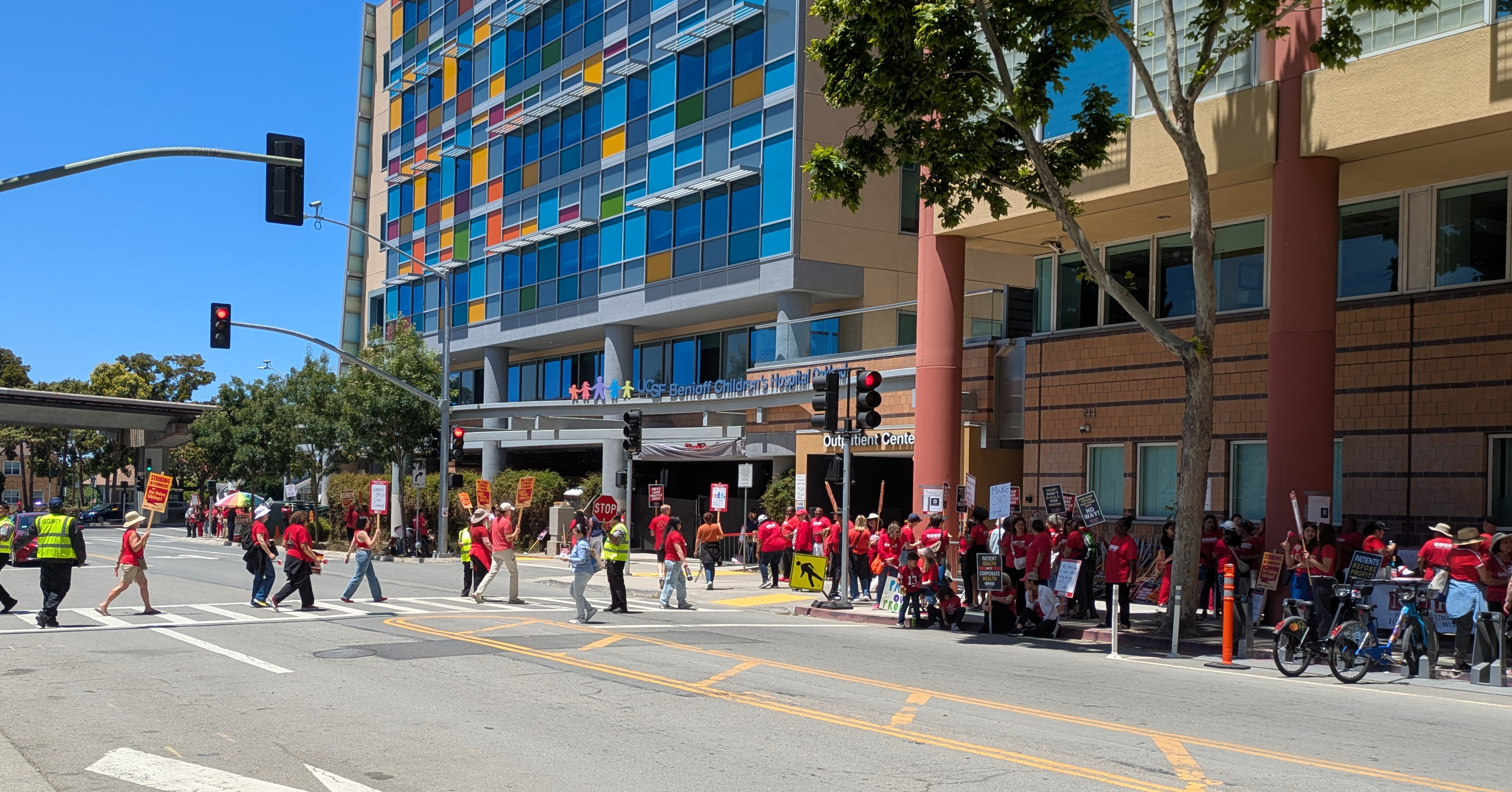
Workers on strike in 2025

In June 2025, healthcare workers represented by the National Union of Healthcare Workers went on strike to protest plans for the hospital's integration with UCSF. The strike was called off later that month following a court ruling that declined to stop the integration.

== Medical Training ==
=== Residency Program ===
==== Background ====
UCSF Benioff Children's Hospital Oakland is a teaching hospital with a three-year Pediatrics residency program, currently employing 78 residents in total. It has attracted medical students from more than 40 schools, who train within the hospital as well as in a number of associated hospitals and clinics.

=== Fellowship Programs ===
In addition to the Pediatrics residency program, UCSF Benioff Children's Hospital Oakland has accredited fellowship programs in Pediatric Critical Care Medicine, Pediatric Emergency Medicine, Pediatric Hematology/Oncology, Pediatric Infectious Disease, and Pediatric Pulmonary Medicine.

== See also ==
- List of hospitals in California
