= Arthur Bridgman Clark =

American architect, professor, author

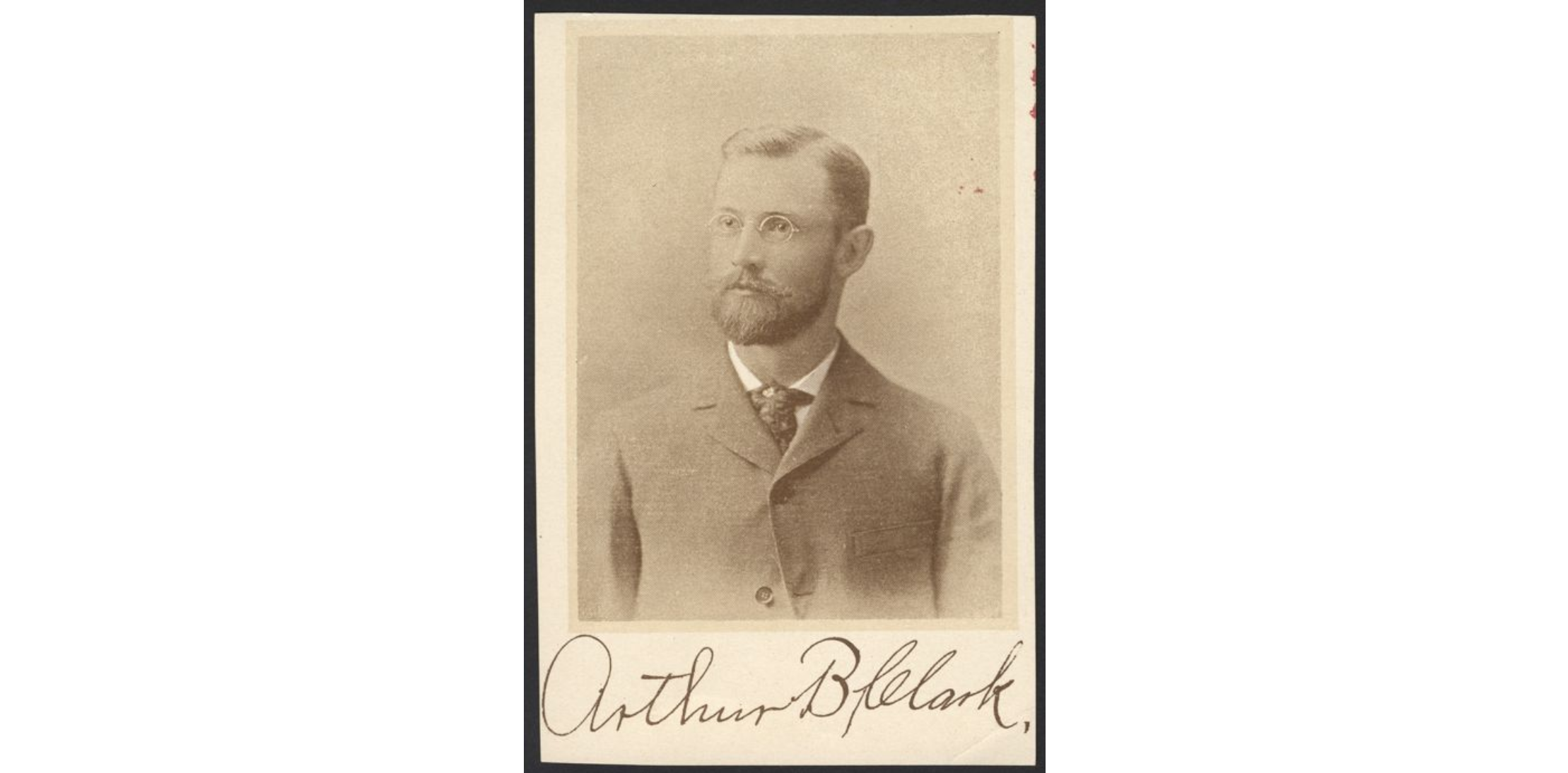
- Arthur Bridgman Clark, circa 1893
- Born: August 11, 1866; Syracuse, New York, U.S.
- Died: May 15, 1948 (aged 81); Palo Alto, California, U.S.
- Other names: Arthur B. Clark, A.B. Clark
- Education: Syracuse University
- Known for: architect, printmaker, author, professor
- Spouse: Hanna Grace Birge
- Children: 4, including Birge Clark

Arthur Bridgman Clark (1866–1948) an American architect, printmaker, author, and professor, as well as the first mayor of Mayfield, California (1855–1925), and first head of Art and Architecture Department at Stanford University. He taught classes at Stanford University from 1893 until 1931.

== About ==
Clark was born August 11, 1866, in Syracuse, New York.

He studied at Syracuse University and earned a Bachelor of Architecture degree in 1886, and a Master of Arts degree in 1891. The same year, in 1891 he married Hanna Grace Birge of Hector, New York. From 1888–1889, he was the Director of State Schools and an instructor of trade school at Elmira Reformatory. He taught Architecture courses at Syracuse University between 1889–c.1892.

Clark and his wife studied painting with William Merritt Chase in Art Students League of New York in 1898 and with John Henry Twachtman and James Whistler in Paris.

Clark moved to California in 1892, settling in the College Terrace neighborhood of Palo Alto. He joined Stanford University 1893, during the early days of the school. He taught graphic design and art classes at Stanford University from 1893 until 1931, when he retired. Students of Clark included artist Jennie V. Cannon.

During the summers when Stanford University classes were out of session, Clark would work as a freelance architect in the Palo Alto-area designing private residencies.

In 1903, Clark spearheaded a movement to incorporate the town of Mayfield, California and was named the town's first mayor. Mayfield was a town that bordered Stanford University and at the time was a popular destination for rowdy bars. While serving as Mayor, Clark banned bars from the town, which has been credited with allowing the town to flourish and grow. He later served as the chairman of the Planning Commission. The town of Mayfield became part of Palo Alto on July 6, 1925.

Clark was a founder and a member of the Pacific Arts Association, and a member of the American Committee for the International Congress of Art Education, the Palo Alto Art Club (now known as Pacific Art League), and California Teachers Association.

Clark died May 15, 1948, in Palo Alto, California, and he is buried at Alta Mesa Memorial Park.

== Notable buildings by Arthur Bridgman Clark ==
Year built	Name	City	Style	Notes
1893	Palo Alto Presbyterian Church (now demolished)	Palo Alto, California		This was the first church building in Palo Alto, and was located on Hamilton Avenue between Bryant and Waverley Streets.
1894	553 Mayfield	Mayfield, California (now Palo Alto)		This house was moved in 1973, previously located on Salvatierra.
1896	356 Lincoln Avenue	Palo Alto, California	American Craftsman bungalow	Single family house, designed for Stanford University mechanical engineering professor, Guido Hugo Marx.
1904	Durand-Kirkman House, 623 Cabrillo Street	Stanford, California	First Bay Tradition	
1909	618 Mirada Ave	Stanford, California		Single family house, designed for the Arthur B. Clark family. Previously located at 767 Santa Ynez Street).
1910	774 Santa Ynez Street	Stanford, California		
1913	Old bookstore (now Career Planning and Placement Center)	Stanford, California		
1914	MacFarland House, 775 Santa Ynez Street	Stanford, California	American Craftsman with Classical Revival features	
1919	Lou Henry Hoover House, 623 Miranda Avenue	Stanford, California	International style house	This house was designed by Lou Hoover, with supervision by Clark and his son, Birge Clark.
1921	661 Cabrillo Avenue	Stanford, California		Single family house, designed for Stanford University astronomy professor, Sidney Dean Townley. Previously located at 613 Salvatierra.

== Publications ==
- Clark, Arthur Bridgman (1936). Perspective: a textbook and manual for artists, architects and students. Stanford, California: Stanford University Press. ISBN 9780598889010.
- Clark, Arthur Bridgman (1921). Art Principles in House, Furniture, and Village Building: an exposition of designing principles which every house builder, furniture user, and village dweller should know. Stanford, California: Stanford University Press.
- Clark, Arthur Bridgman (1915). Significant Paintings at the Panama-Pacific Exposition: how to find them and how to enjoy them. Stanford, California: Stanford University Press.
- Clark, Arthur Bridgman (1915). Design: A Text-book for Students and Craftsworkers. San Francisco, California: Sunset Publishing.

== See also ==
- National Register of Historic Places listings in Santa Clara County, California
