= Esther Clark (physician) =

American physician

Dr. Esther Clark

Esther Bridgman Clark (1900–1990) was one of the first woman physicians in California. She was the only pediatrician in the mid San Francisco peninsula in 1927, and was an early partner of the Palo Alto Medical Clinic in the 1930s.

== Life ==
Clark was born of Stanford art professor Arthur B. Clark and Grace Clark in Palo Alto. She was raised in Palo Alto and educated at Stanford, and practiced medicine in Palo Alto until her retirement in 1973. As a physician, Clark did house calls as well as office appointments, focused on community health and prevention, served the region for many years. She co-founded the Palo Alto Medical Clinic, and later founded the Children's Health Council. She emphasized immunization, and chaired the American Academy of Pediatric Child Accident Prevention Commission.

Clark's brother, Birge Clark, was a prominent local architect, who designed the building for the Palo Alto Medical Clinic at 300 Homer Avenue, Palo Alto, known today as the Roth Building.

== Legacy ==
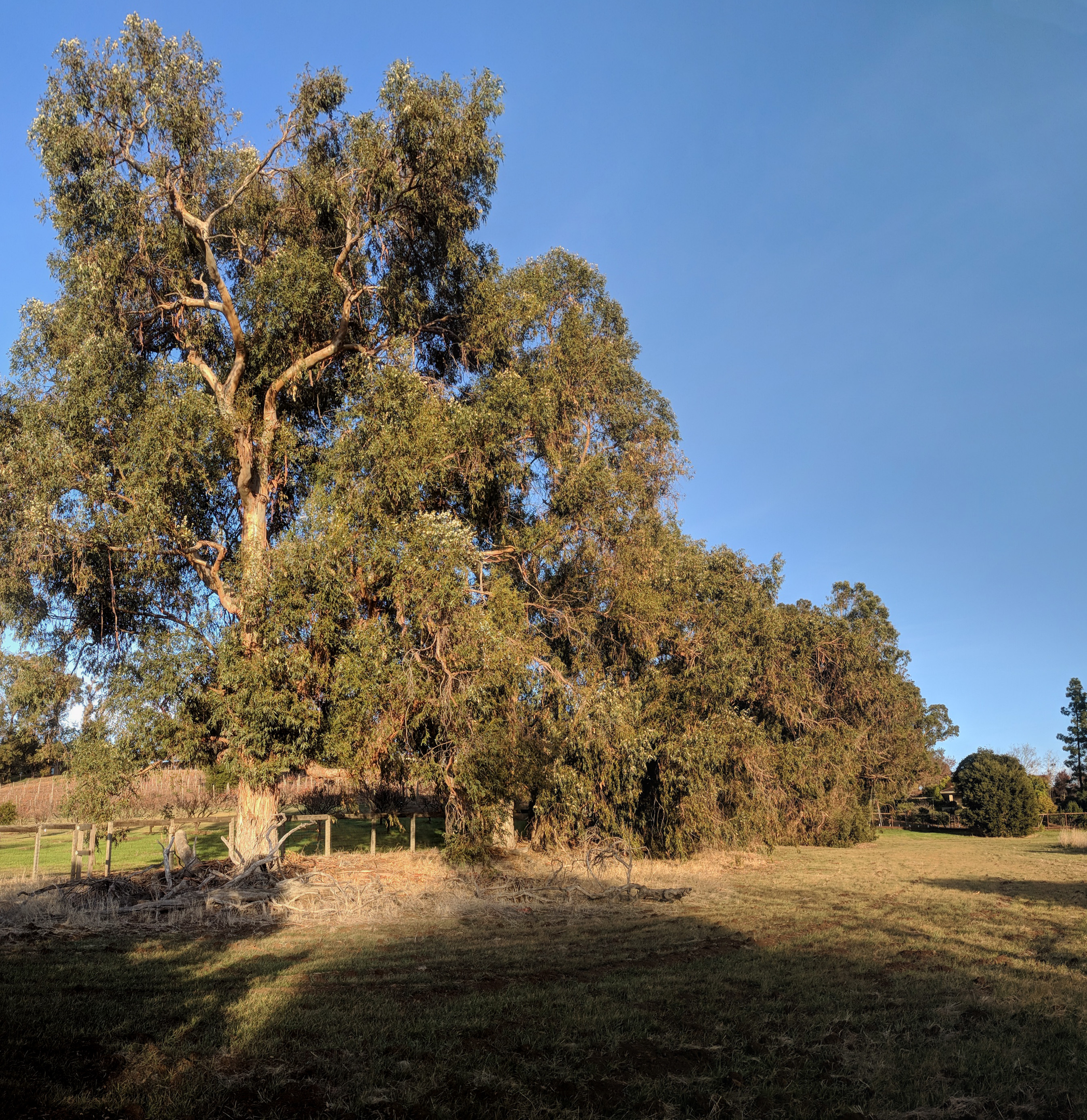
At Esther Clark Park

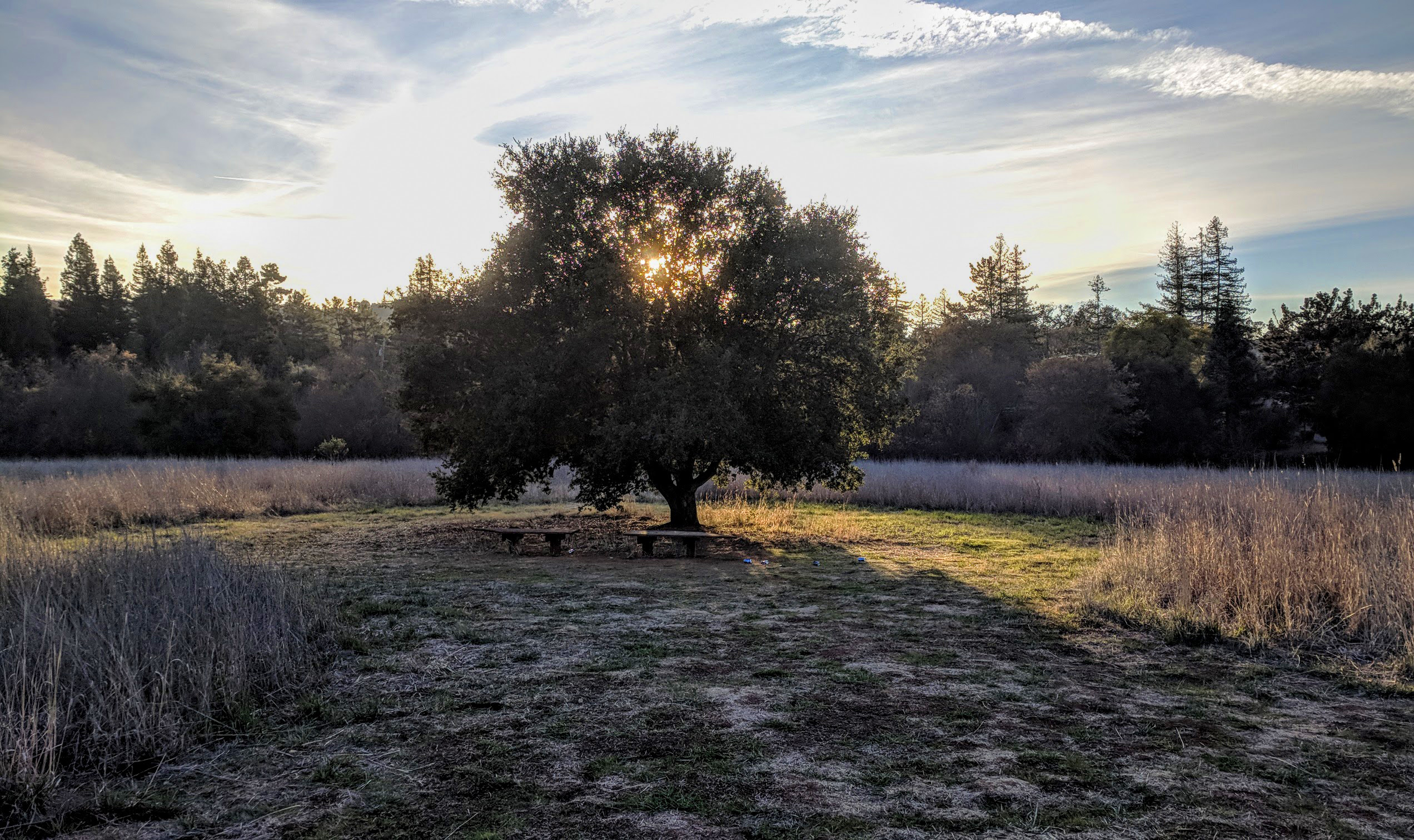
At Esther Clark Park

Palo Alto's Esther Clark Park (on the border of Los Altos Hills) is a large property that Clark sold to the city for use as a park. Clark bought the land in 1944 from Ruolf Isenberg, who had used it in the 1930s as an airstrip for the area. The property was a portion of the Rancho La Purísima Concepción, and includes a historic marker for the Juana Briones earth and wood home that was located nearby, at 4155 Old Adobe Road.
