= Dwight Locke Wilbur =

American physician

- Born: September 18, 1903
- Died: March 9, 1997 (aged 93)
- Education: Stanford University; University of Pennsylvania
- Occupation: Medical doctor
- Parent: Ray Lyman Wilbur

Dwight Locke Wilbur (September 18, 1903 – March 9, 1997) was a medical doctor and president of the American Medical Association. During his 1968-69 tenure, he was instrumental in convincing that organization to accept Medicare after many years of opposition.

== Biography ==
=== Early life ===
Dwight Locke Wilbur was born on September 18, 1903. His father was Secretary of the Interior and AMA President Ray Lyman Wilbur. He graduated from Stanford University in 1923 and received his M.D. from the University of Pennsylvania in 1926.

=== Career ===
He was a founder of both the San Francisco Society of Internal Medicine and the California Society of Internal Medicine. He also served as president of the American Gastroenterological Association from 1954 to 1955 and president of the American College of Physicians in 1959. As a gastroenterologist and professor of medicine at Stanford starting in 1949, he published more than 200 scholarly articles.

=== Death ===
He died on March 9, 1997.
