= Antonio Suñol =

Californio businessman and politician (1797–1865)

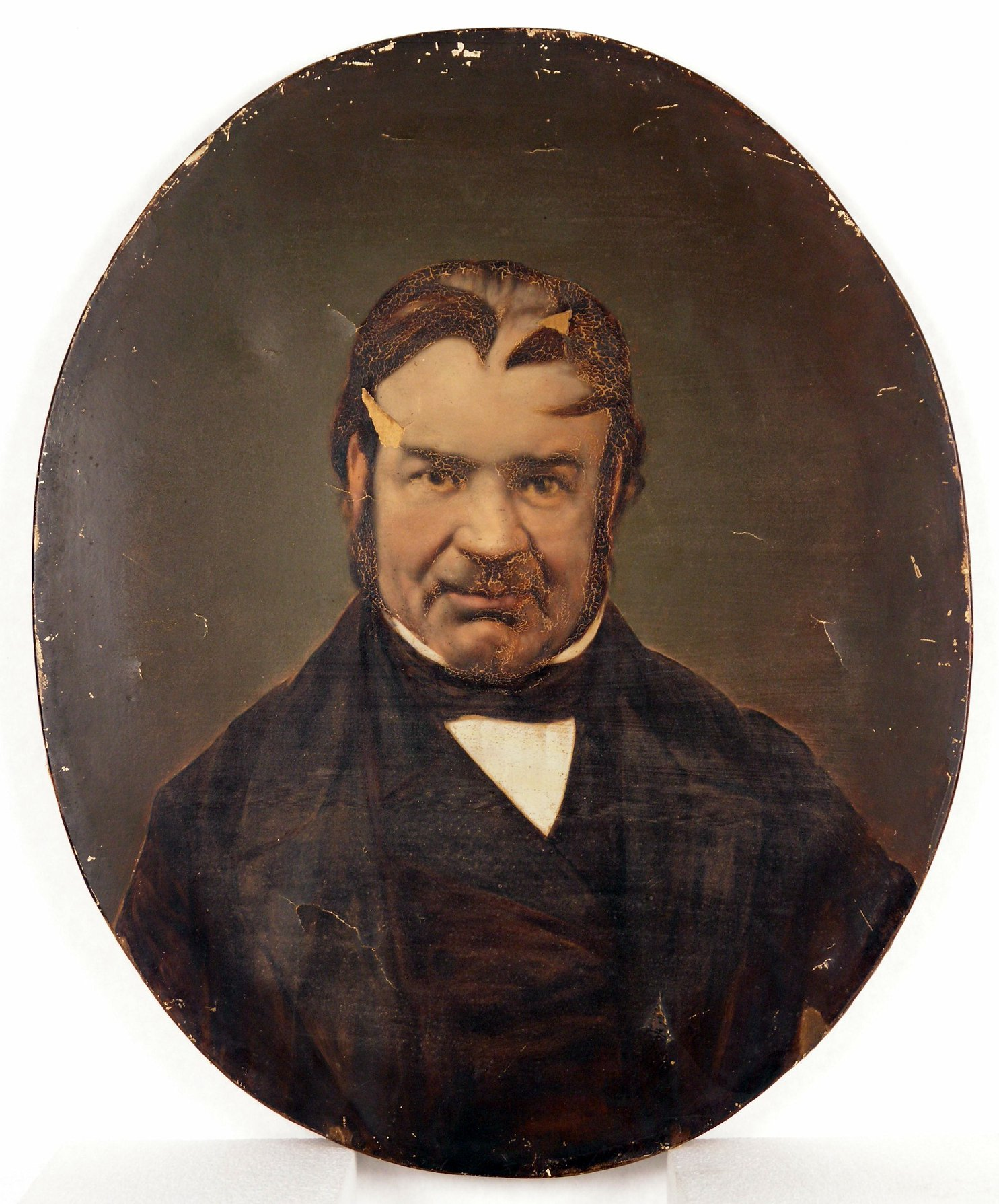

Alcalde of San José
- In office 1841
- Preceded by: Dolores Pacheco
- Succeeded by: Antonio Buelna
- In office 1826
- Preceded by: Joaquín Higuera
- Succeeded by: Mariano Castro

Personal details
- Born: 13 June 1797 Barcelona, Spain
- Died: 18 March 1865 (aged 67) San José, California
- Profession: Politician, ranchero

Don Antonio María Suñol (13 June 1797 – 18 March 1865) was a Spanish-born Californio businessman, ranchero, and politician. He served two terms as Alcalde of San José (mayor) and was one of the largest landowners in the Bay Area. He is the namesake of the town of Sunol and the founder of Willow Glen, an affluent neighborhood of San Jose.

== Biography ==
Suñol was born on 13 June 1797 to a Catalan family of minor nobility in Barcelona, Spain. He emigrated to Alta California in 1817, to Yerba Buena (modern San Francisco). By 1818, he had moved to San José.

Circa 1820, he opened what is considered to be the first mercantile in San José, on the Plaza del Pueblo (modern Plaza de César Chávez). His store dealt in fur hides, lumber, alcohol, and other essentials. The success of Suñol's store gradually transformed him into one of the most prominent businessmen in the Santa Clara Valley.

Suñol served as Alcalde of San José (mayor) for two terms, first in 1826 and then 1841.

In 1835, he donated the land at the northeast corner of the Plaza del Pueblo for the reconstruction of San José Church. Suñol, alongside his brother-in-law Antonio María Pico (who served as Alcalde of San José at the time), oversaw the construction of the church for the next eight years until its completion and consecration in 1846. In 1842, Suñol petitioned Francisco García Diego y Moreno, the Bishop of the Californias, for proper religious vestments and relics for the church.

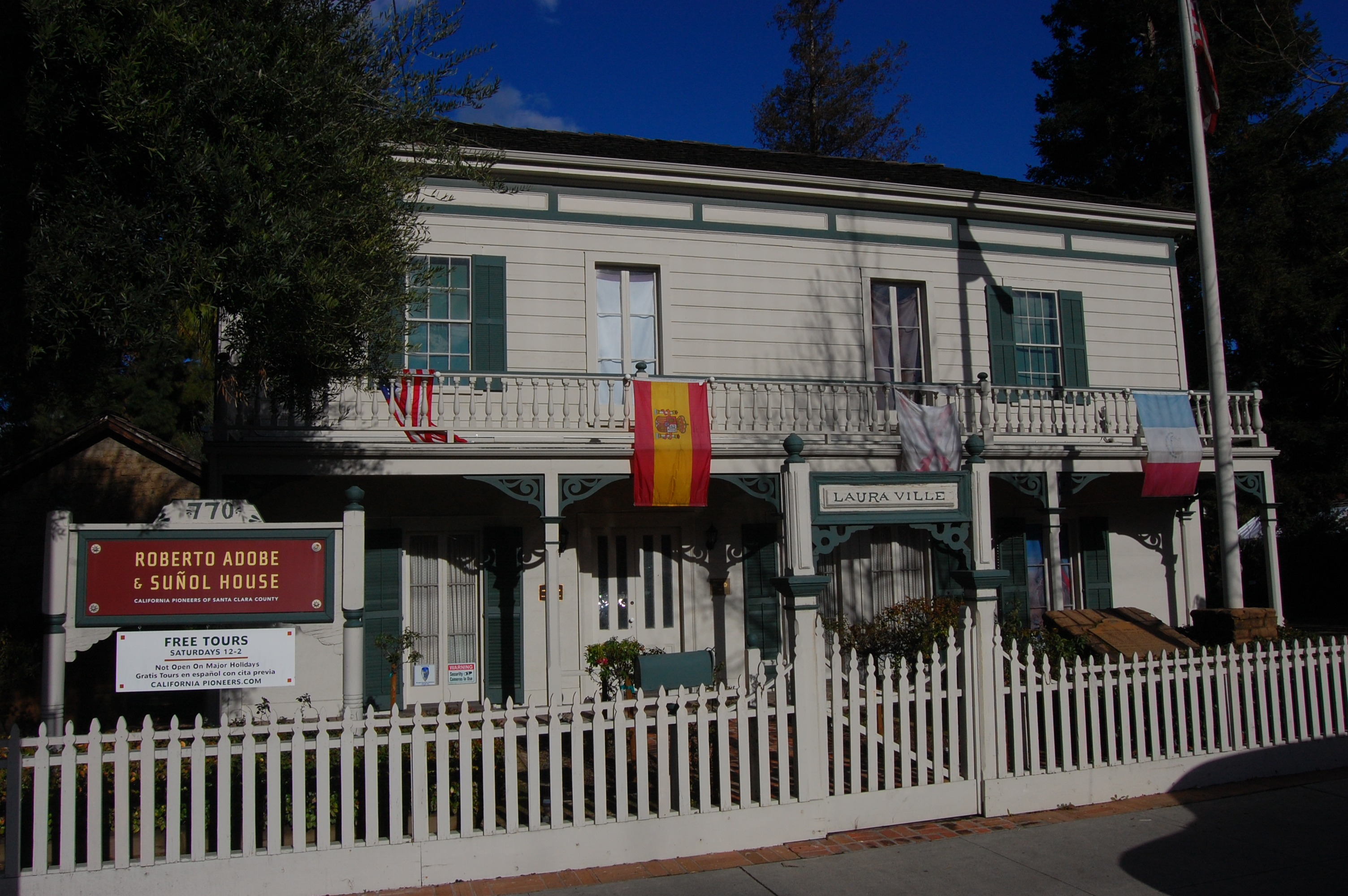
The Roberto-Suñol Adobe, a California Historical Landmark in Willow Glen, San Jose

Suñol amassed numerous rancho grants over his lifetime. He was granted Rancho Agua Caliente in Alameda County in 1836. In 1839, he and his three brothers-in-law (Antonio María Pico, Juan Pablo Bernal, and Agustín Bernal) were granted Rancho Valle de San José, formerly belonging to Mission San José. In 1844, he was granted Rancho Los Coches (in modern-day Midtown San Jose and Willow Glen neighborhoods of San Jose), where he built the Roberto-Suñol Adobe, a California Historical Landmark and now under the leadership of the California Pioneers of Santa Clara County.

He is considered the founder of Sunol, California, which was founded on his Rancho Valle de San José. Suñol is also considered to be the founder of Willow Glen, a prominent neighborhood of San Jose, California.

Beginning in 1839, Suñol became a close confident and financier of John Sutter, the founder of Sacramento and an important figure in the California Gold Rush. Sutter eventually became heavily indebted to Suñol.

Suñol died on 18 March 1865 and is buried at Mission Santa Clara de Asís.

== Personal life ==
Suñol married María de los Dolores Bernal on 7 September 1823 at Mission Santa Clara de Asís. They had eight children together: José Antonio, José Dolores, José Narciso, Francisca, Paula, Antonia, María de la Encarnación, and Marcelina.

His daughter Paula Suñol de Sainsevain was married to Pedro Sainsevain, a signer of the Californian Constitution in 1849.
