= Willow Glen, San Jose =

Willow Glen
- Neighborhood of San Jose
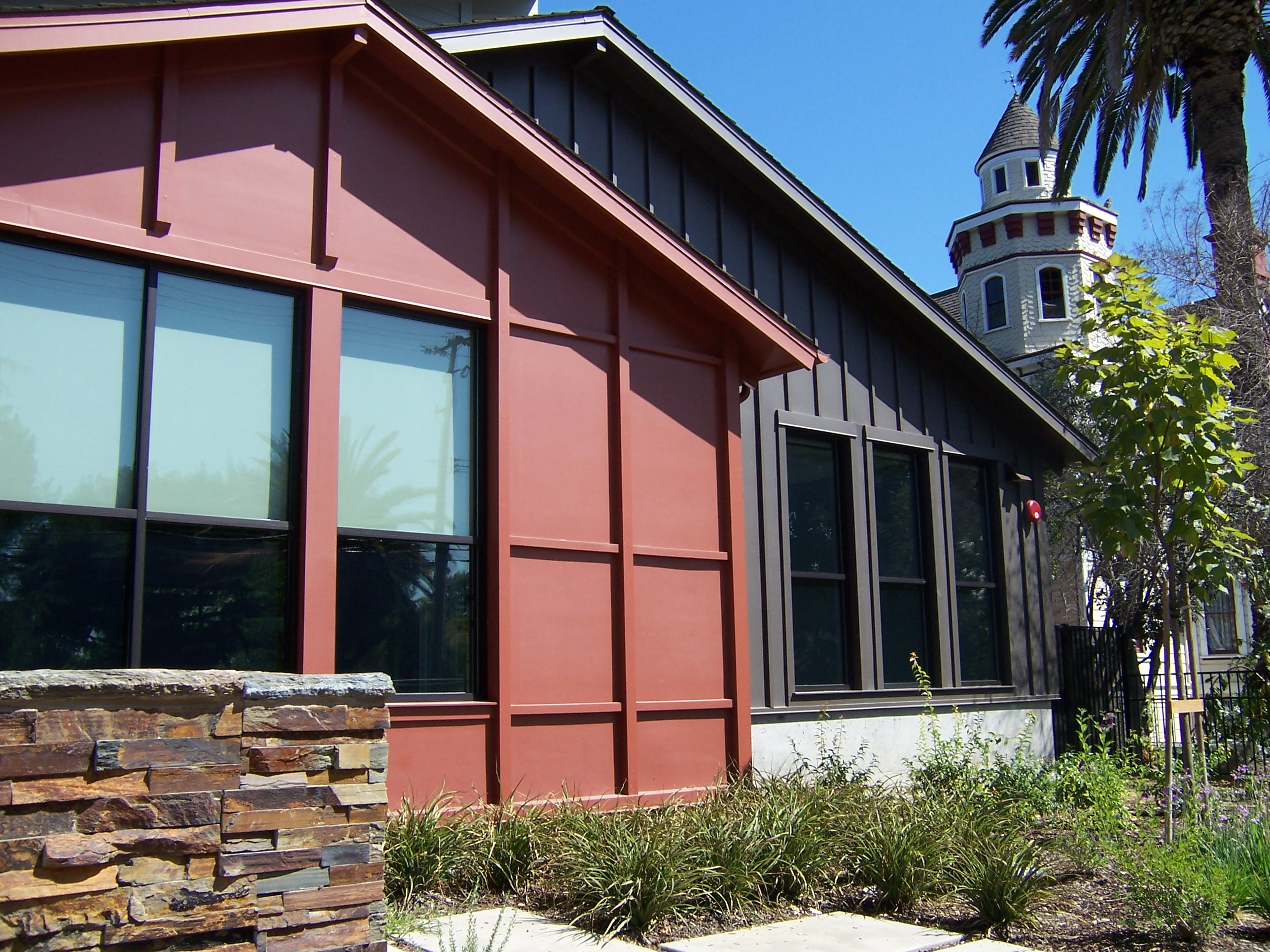
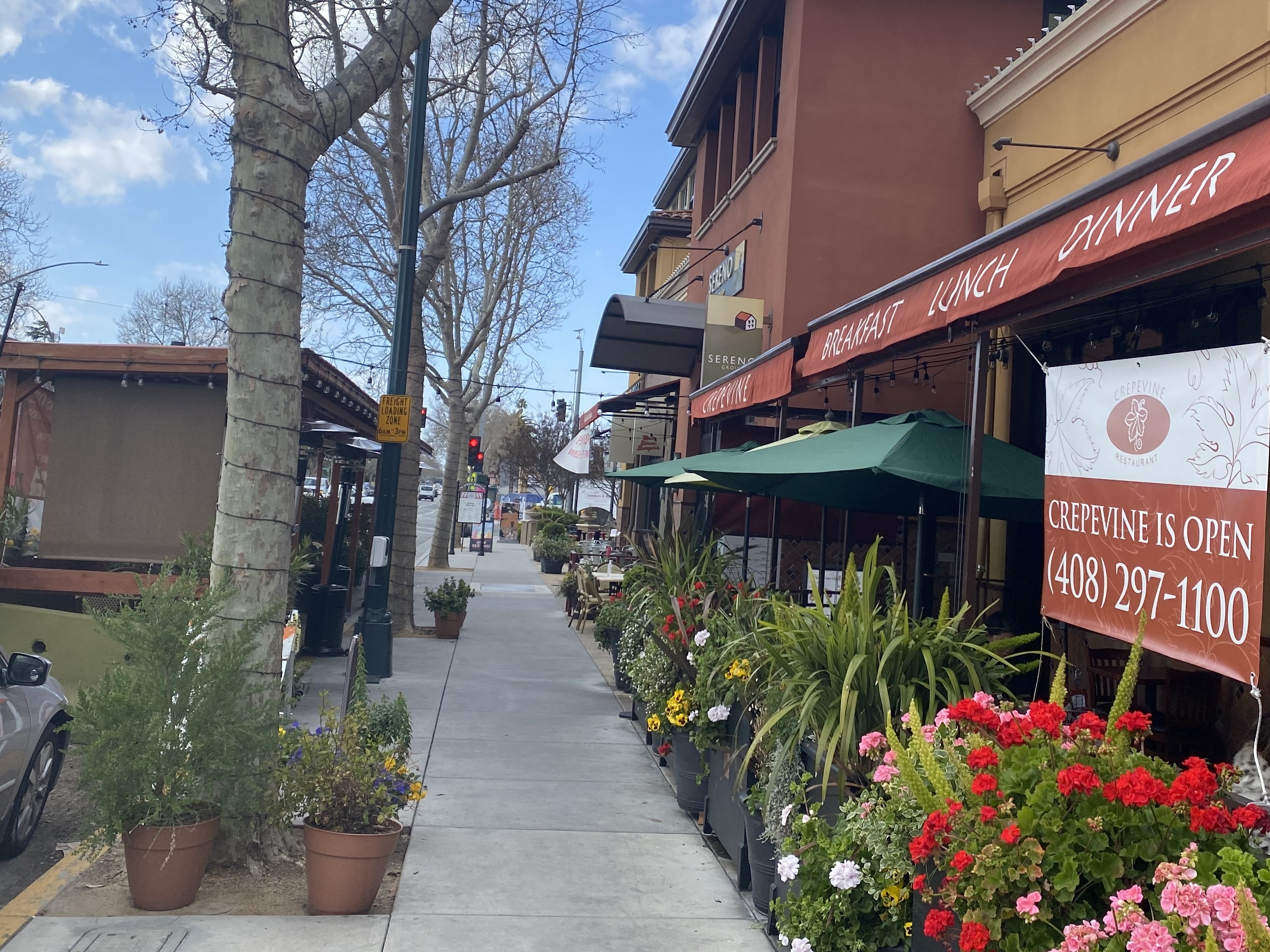
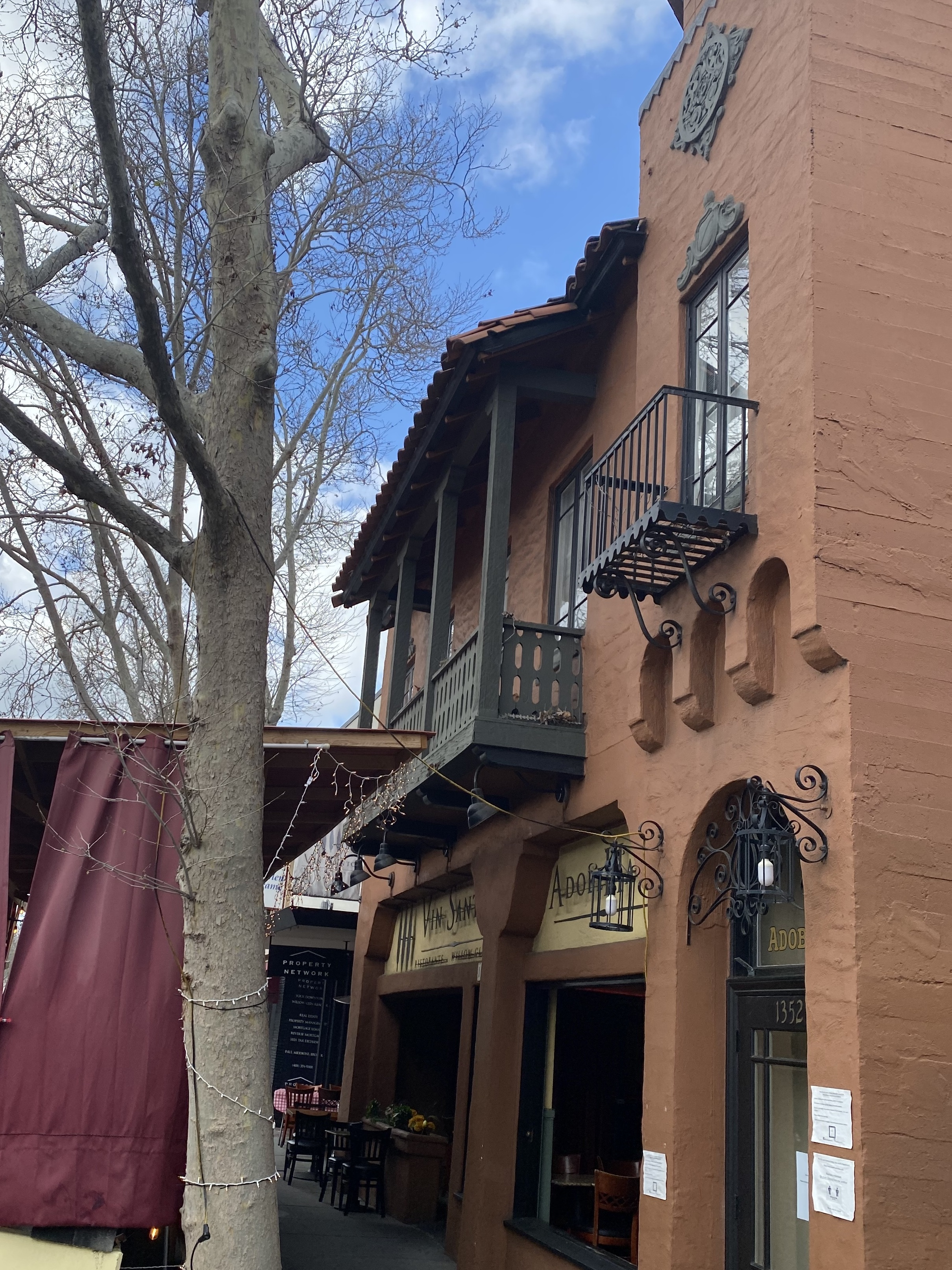
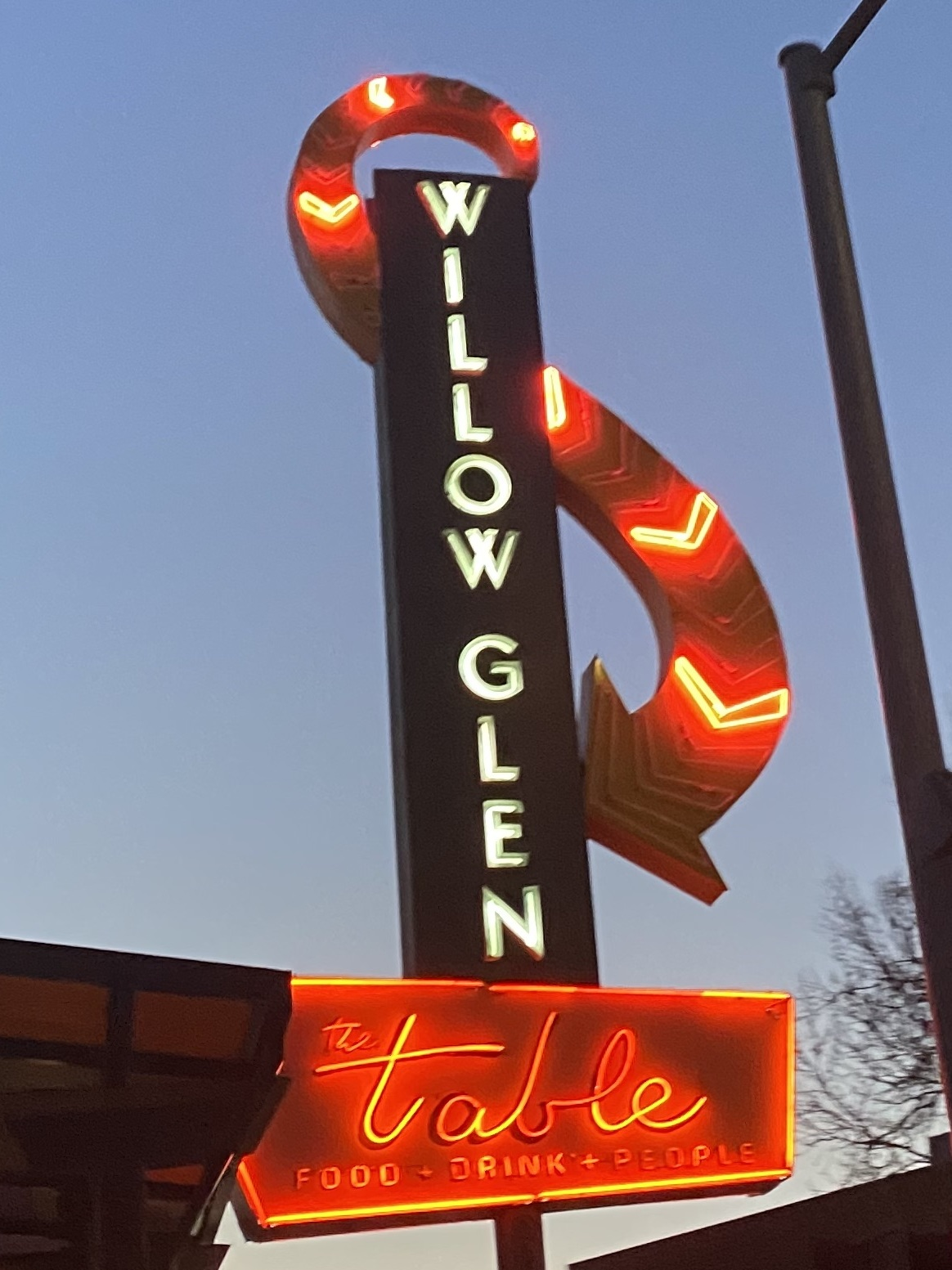
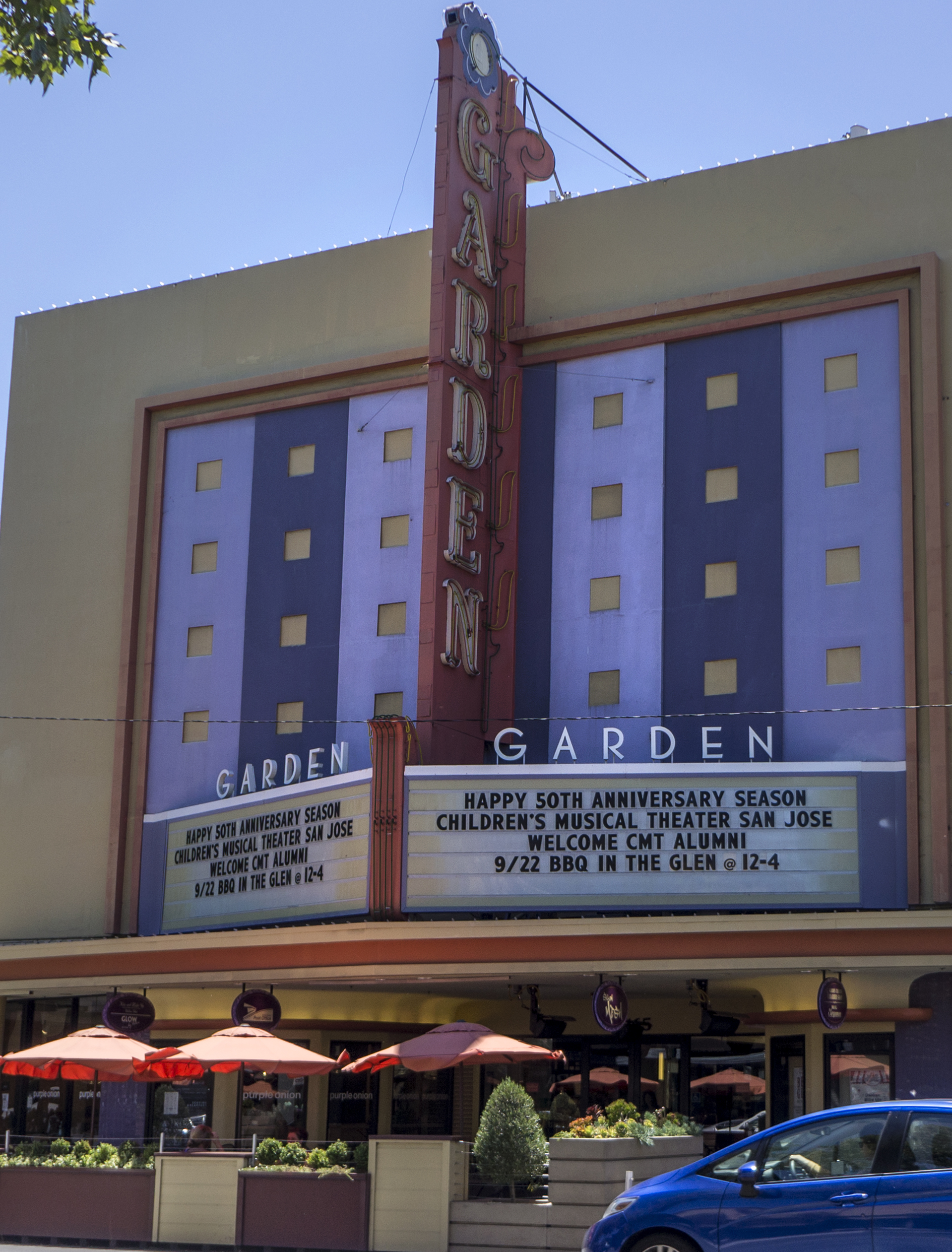
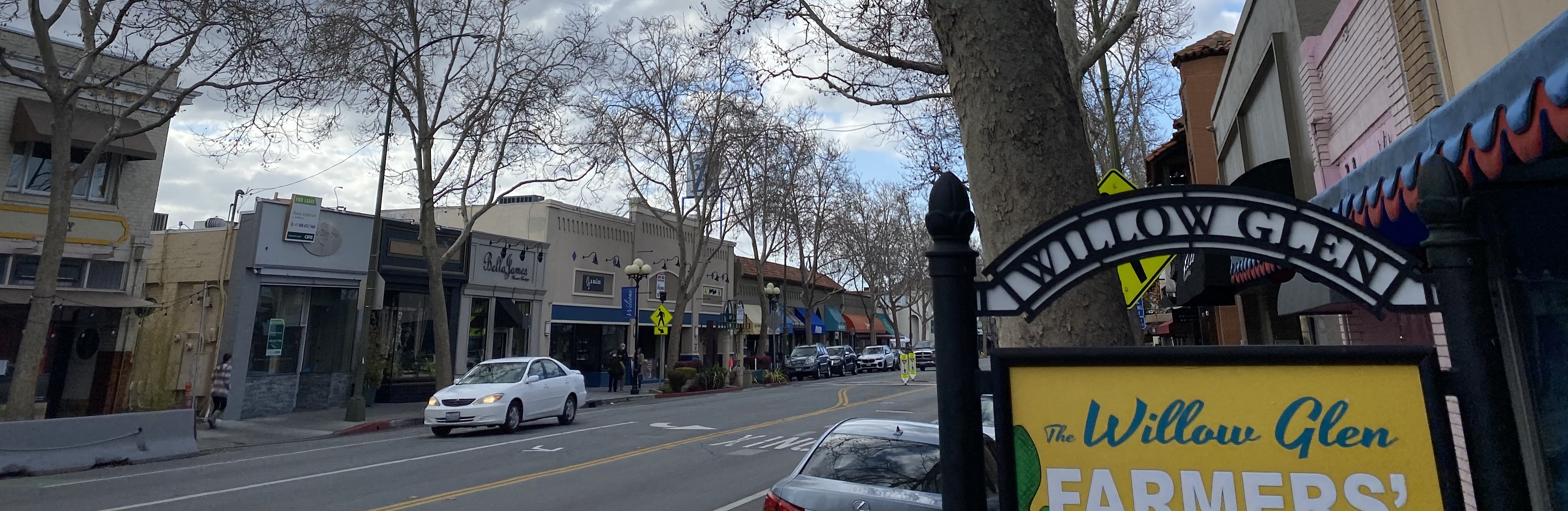
- Top: Willow Glen Branch of the San José Public Library, Lincoln Ave; middle: Lincoln Ave, Willow Glen Sign; historic Garden Theater; bottom: Downtown Willow Glen.
- Coordinates: 37.30357°N 121.897345°W
- Country: United States
- State: California
- County: Santa Clara
- City: San Jose
- Elevation: 115 ft (35 m)

Willow Glen is a district of San Jose, California, in Santa Clara County. Willow Glen is known for its historic downtown, dining and shopping, and is one of the most expensive neighborhoods to live in San Jose. Willow Glen was originally an independent town, until it voted to be annexed by San Jose in 1936.

== History ==
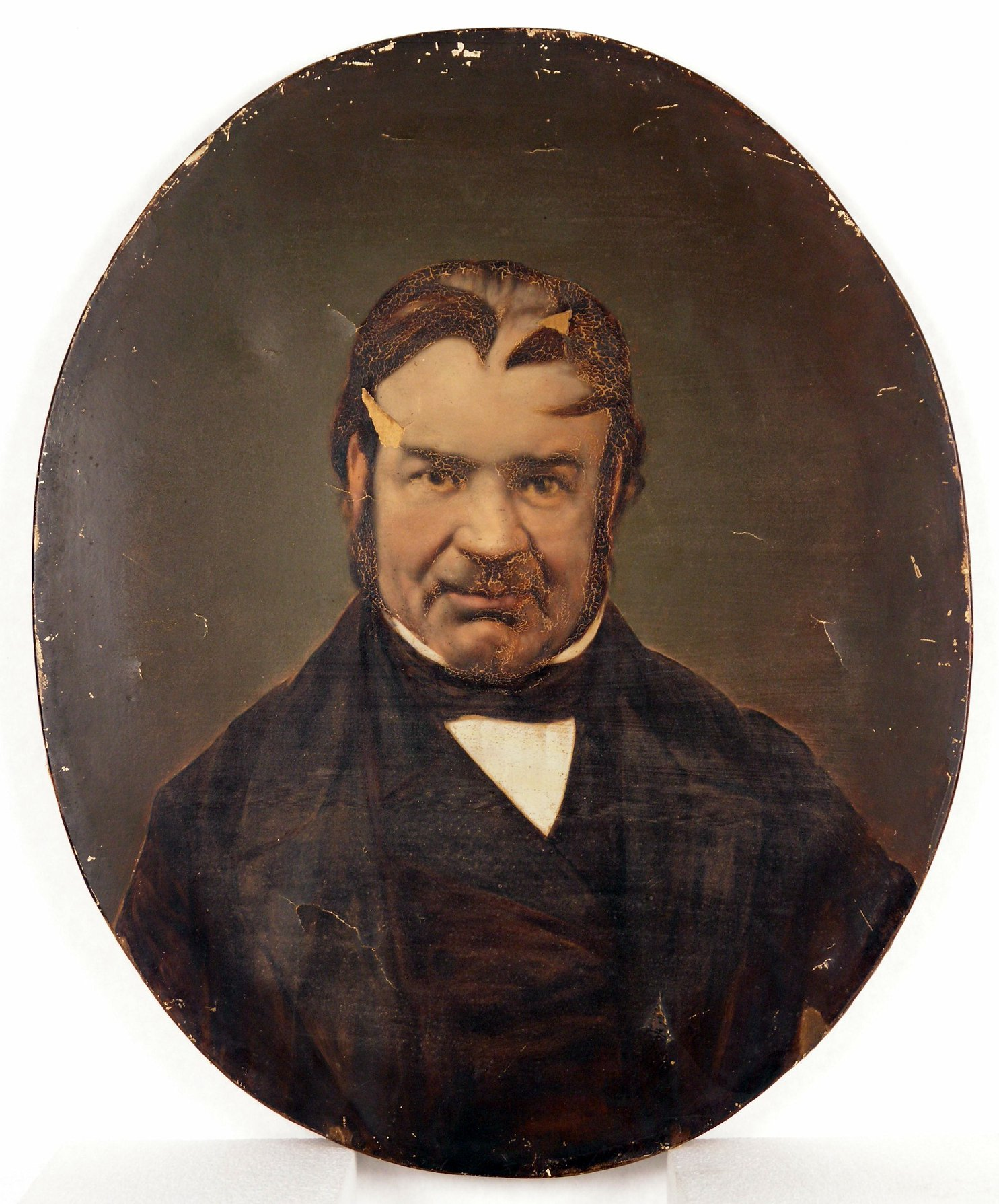
Don Antonio Suñol, longtime owner of Rancho Los Coches and the Roberto-Suñol Adobe, is considered the founder of Willow Glen.

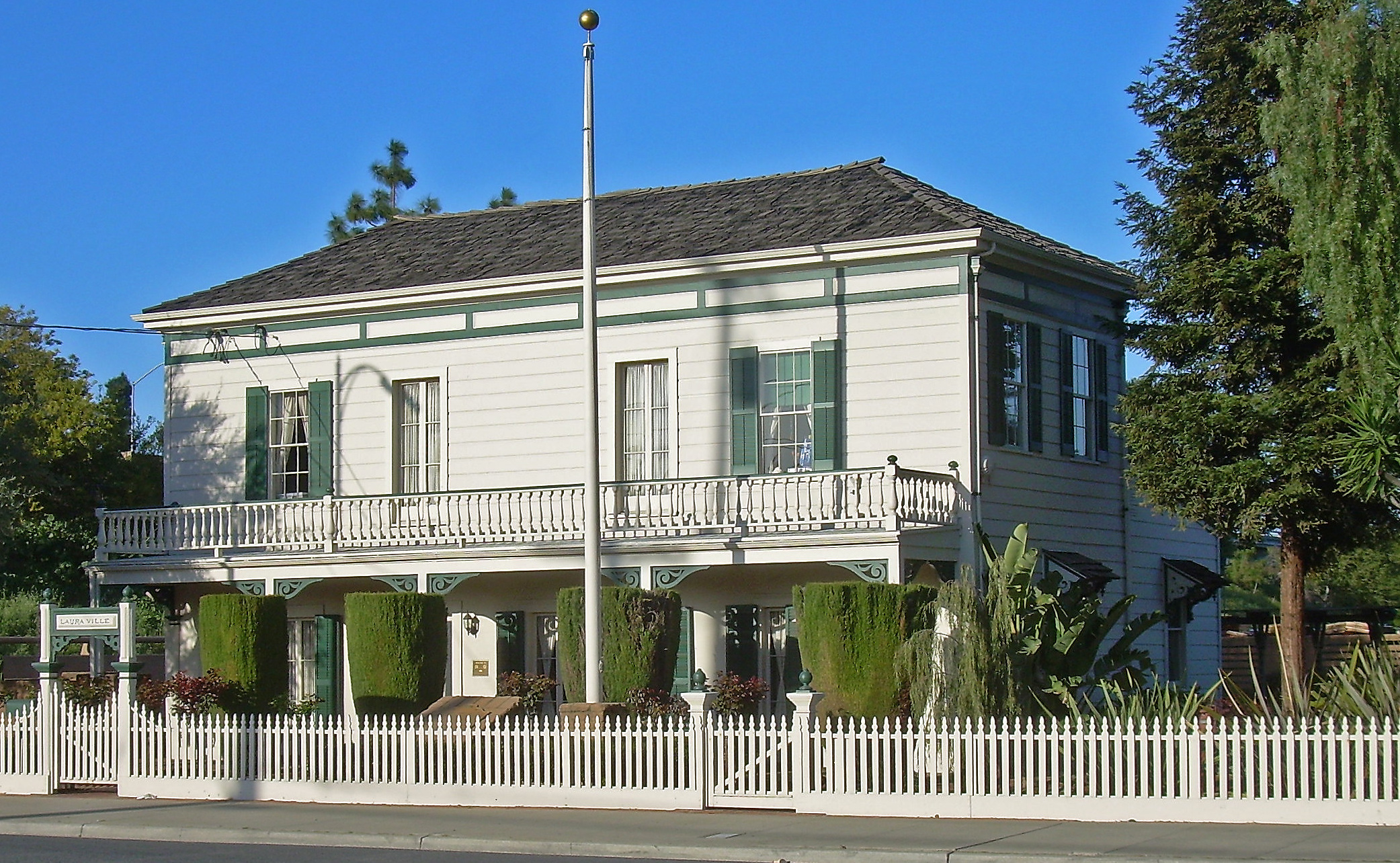
The historic Roberto-Suñol Adobe is listed on the National Register of Historic Places.

The neighborhood began in the mid-1800s as Rancho de los Coches and Rancho San Juan Bautista, Mexican land grants adjacent to the San Jose pueblo. Don Antonio Suñol, who owned Rancho de los Coches and built the Roberto-Suñol Adobe, is considered to be the founder of the community.

"Willow Glen" was named for the marshy wet area between the Guadalupe River and Los Gatos Creek, which were abundant in willows and cattails, unusual for the rest of the region. By the 1860s the small unincorporated community needed its first school, and Willow Glen Elementary School was founded in 1863 on land donated by Ira Cottle.

Much of Willow Glen was laid out by Frank Lewis and Isaac Bird (the namesake of "Bird Avenue"). In 1860, Lewis dug the channel between Willow Street and Curtner Avenue that carries the Guadalupe River to this day. That channel effectively drained the marsh and opened Willow Glen for farming. By the late 1800s, Willow Glen was generally considered one of the most prized locations in all of the Santa Clara Valley for raising wheat, barley, hay, tobacco and hops. By 1880, plots of Willow Glen farmland were priced nearly 10 times higher than similar plots in the valley.

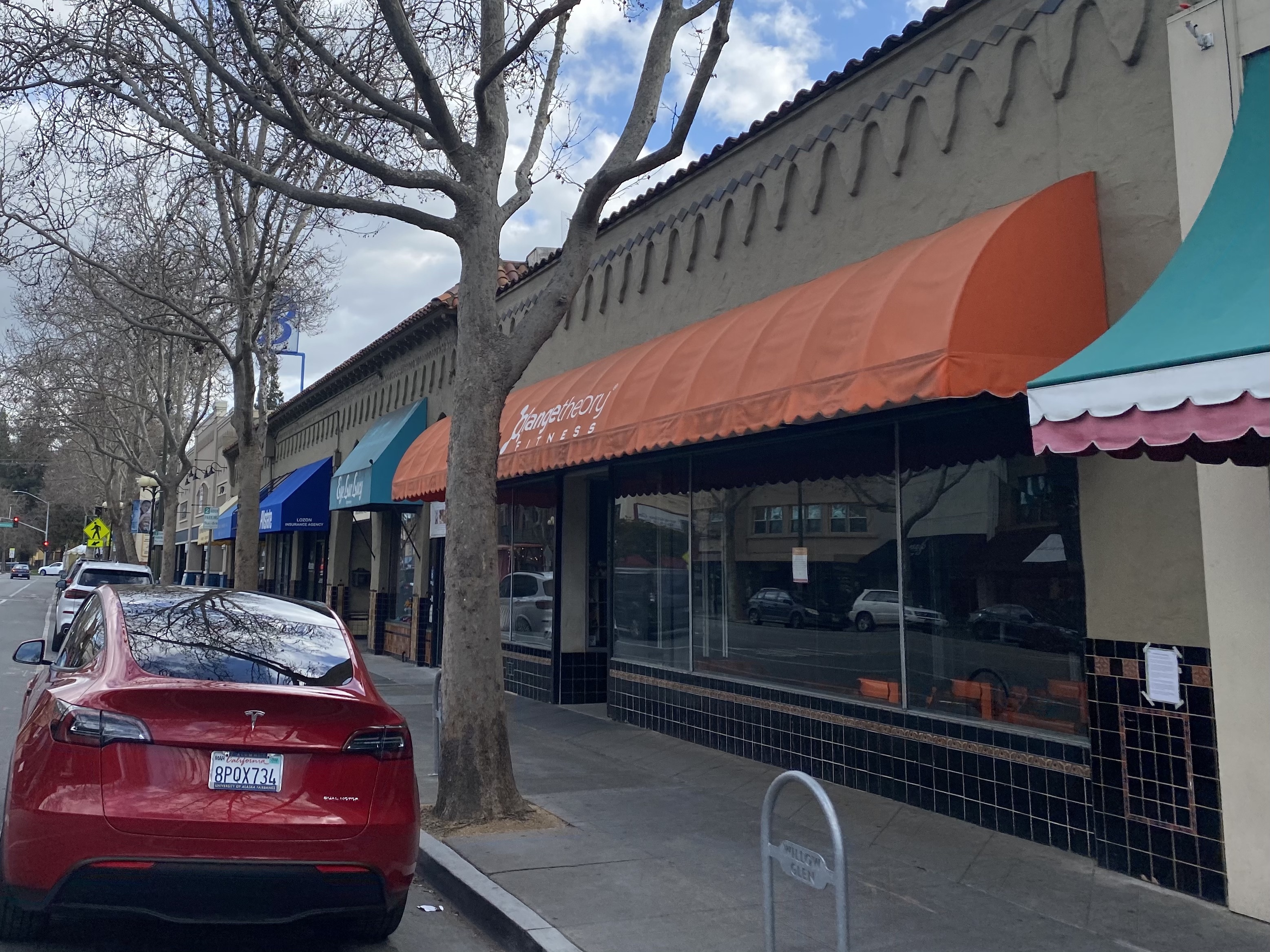
Spanish Colonial Revival architecture in Downtown Willow Glen.

Lincoln Avenue was renamed from "Willow Glen Road" in 1865, shortly after the assassination of President Abraham Lincoln.

Willow Glen continued as an unincorporated community until the 1920s, when the City of San Jose ordered the Southern Pacific Railroad to re-route the Southern Pacific Railroad trunk line which at that time was going down Fourth Street. The Southern Pacific then proposed to re-route down Lincoln Avenue. In order to forestall that attempt, Willow Glen was incorporated as a city in 1927. The railroad was instead re-routed to its current route through a then-unincorporated area now known as North Willow Glen, where its principal user is now Caltrain.

Being a city, however, required thinking about issues such as sewage. Willow Glen had no sewer system – individual homes had their own cesspools or septic systems. Because the area was marshy before being drained for Willow Glen, the high water table resulted in raw sewage often spilling above-ground from flooded cesspools. Rather than build their own very expensive sewage treatment system, in 1936 Willow Glen's residents opted to be annexed to San Jose and be linked to San Jose's sewage system, the measure passing by a vote of 978 to 871.

== Geography ==
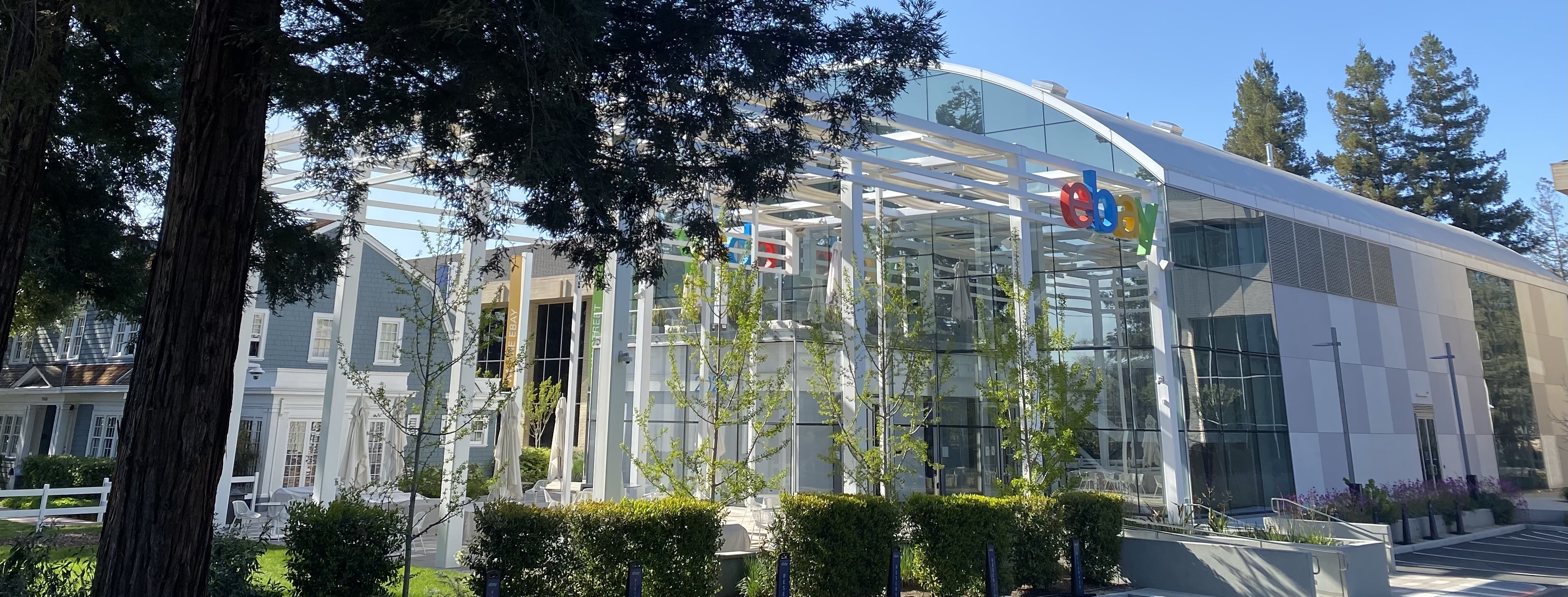
eBay headquarters in Willow Glen.

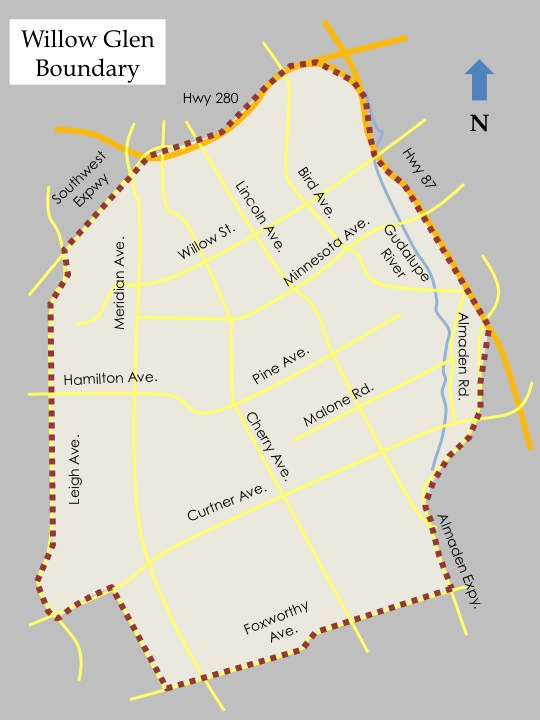
Map of Willow Glen's boundaries.

Willow Glen includes areas within zip code 95125, though not all of the zip code area can actually be considered to be part of the Willow Glen neighborhood, and there are areas within the 95126 zip code that many people would consider to be part of Willow Glen. The Willow Glen Neighborhood Association's by-laws reserve voting memberships to individuals and businesses within boundaries of the Association defined by the San Jose 2009 Greenprint – Willow Glen Planning Area Map, and within 1/2 mile of the Greenprint boundary.

Interstate 280 is almost universally accepted as the community's northern border. The Guadalupe River was the original eastern border of Willow Glen during its time as a municipality. The Los Gatos Creek originally served as a natural western end for the community, until 1866, when extreme flooding of the creek caused it to naturally cut a new channel running far west around what was traditionally considered Willow Glen. The reshaped creek left behind a dry creek bed, known as the "Dry Creek," and opened up Willow Glen for greater southwest expansion.

=== Areas and neighborhood ===
- Palm Haven – historic residence park neighborhood
- Gardner/North Willow Glen – northern area of the district
- Lincoln Glen/Willow Glen South – southwestern area of the district
- Downtown Willow Glen – central shopping and dining area

== Culture ==
=== Architecture ===
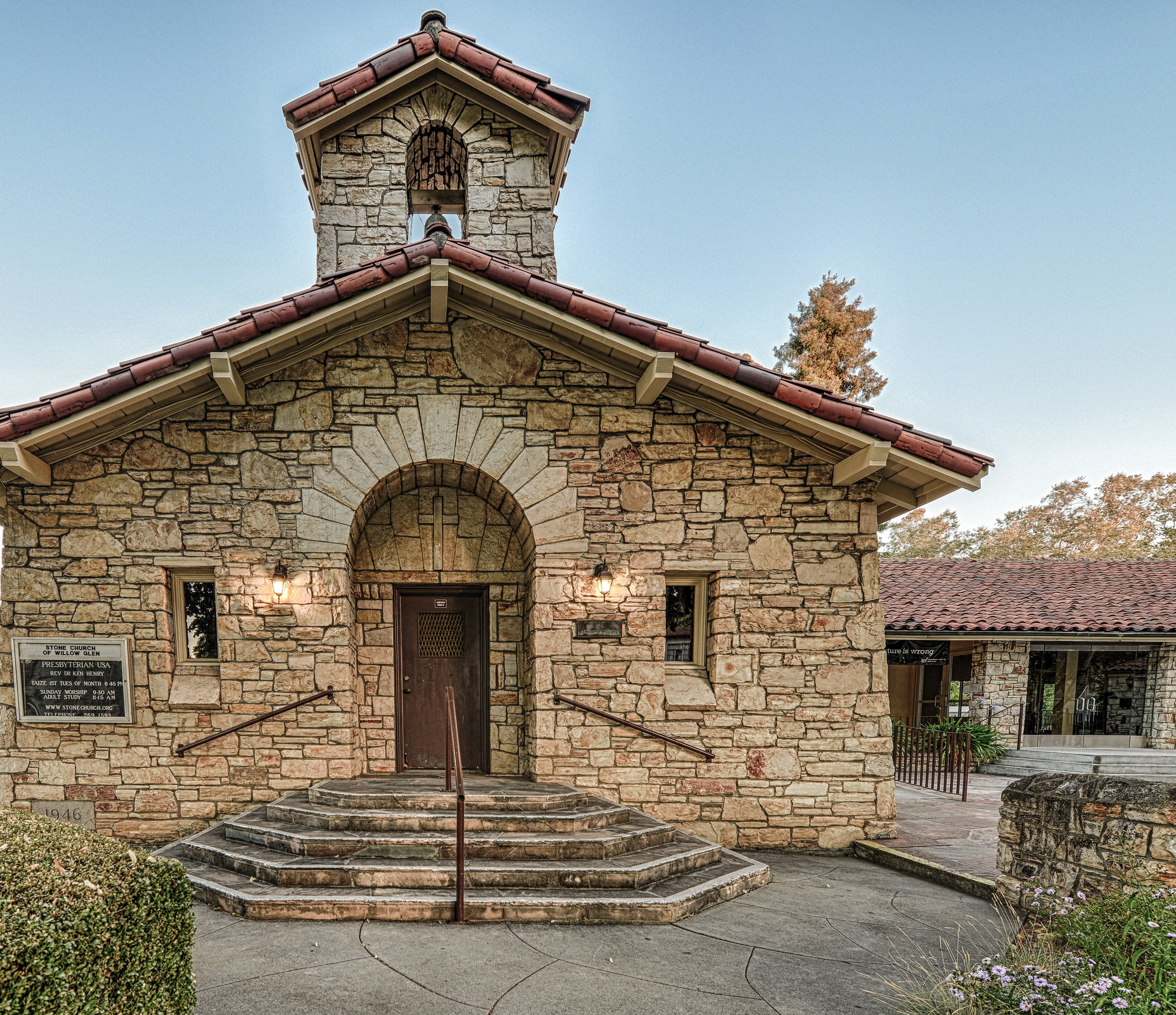
The Stone Church of Willow Glen.

Willow Glen neighborhoods are almost exclusively composed of custom or semi-custom homes in a diverse range of architectural styles. Many architect-commissioned houses can be seen in the neighborhood, including Victorian, Neoclassical (Queen Anne Cottage and Neocolonial), Colonial Revival, Craftsman, Mission, Prairie, Spanish Eclectic, Eichler Homes, and Tudor. In recent years many smaller houses have been replaced with larger houses.

=== Dancin' on the Avenue ===
Dancin' on the Avenue was Willow Glen's annual street party that occurs on one day in the summer, along Lincoln Avenue between Willow Street and Minnesota Avenue. The event was organized by the Willow Glen Business Association. It ran from 1995 to 2018.

=== Founders' Day ===
Founders' Day occurs in September although it has not been celebrated every year. The event celebrates the rich history, cultural heritage, and progressive present of the neighborhoods, homes, and community of Willow Glen. The highlight is a festive parade that proceeds down Lincoln Avenue. The origins of Founders' Day are not known. Archives of the Willow Glen Resident newspaper indicate it originates from the area's nine years of independence from San Jose between September 8, 1927, and September 4, 1936. Another view is that it celebrates the work of Antonio Suñol who built Laura Ville in 1847.

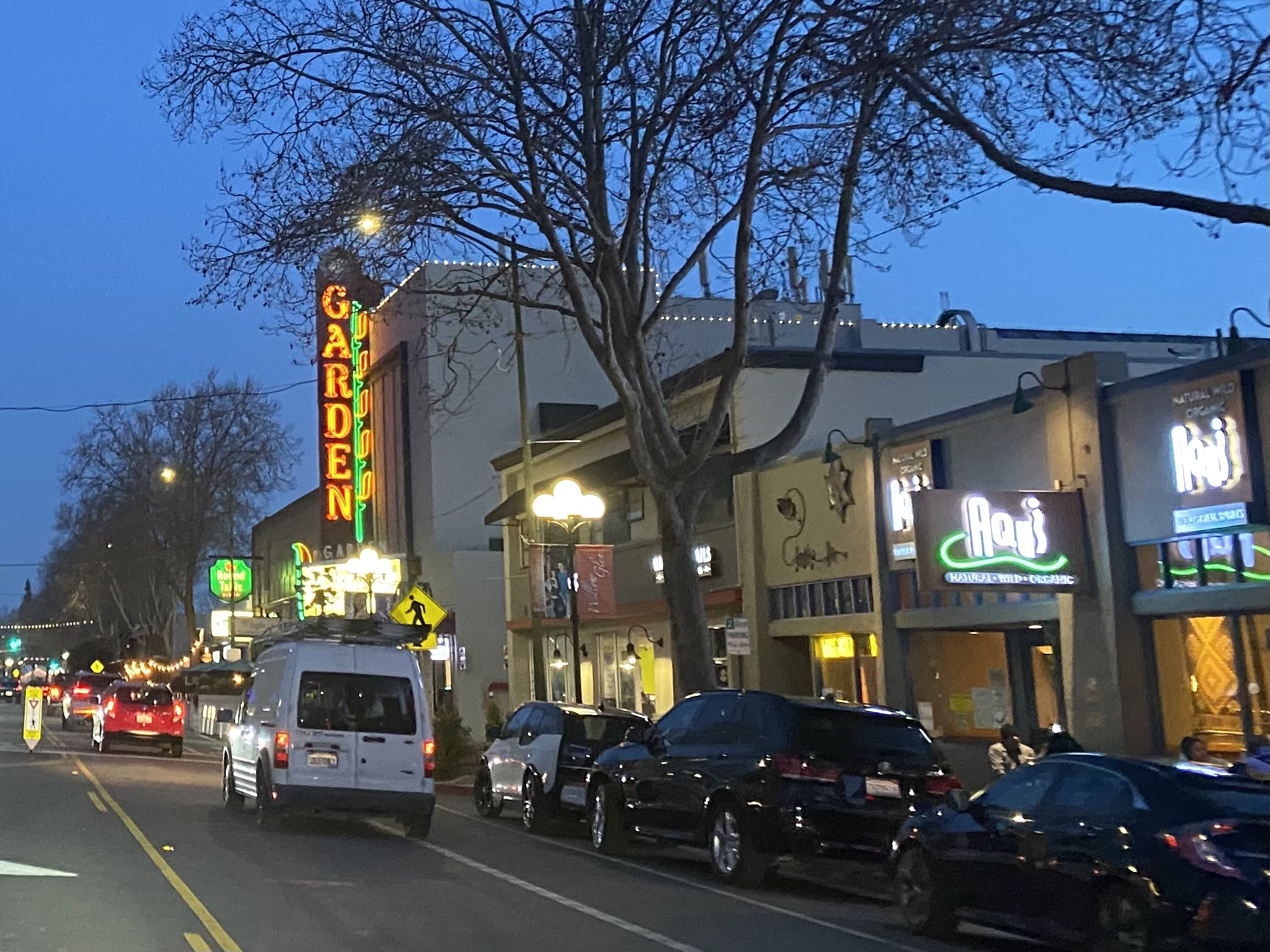
Downtown Willow Glen.

=== Christmas decorations ===
Willow Glen residents have a distinct Christmas tree decoration tradition. This tradition involves buying similar, very small, Christmas trees and placing them in the front yard ten feet from the sidewalk with multicolored lights. People and businesses in the neighborhood generally make significant decorations every year, both within the neighborhood and in the Lincoln Avenue business district, drawing visitors from all around the area.

The tradition of a Christmas tree on each residence's lawn was started in 1950 by Robert and Arlene Cimino. Trees were purchased in bulk from the Knights of Columbus and delivered to participating homes. The Ciminos moved from the area in 1956 and the tradition was continued by Frank Badagliacca Jr. His wife, Dolores Badagliacca, came up with the idea of putting a single white light on the top of each tree. The tradition now stretches to over 200 streets in the greater San Jose area.

== Parks and Plazas ==
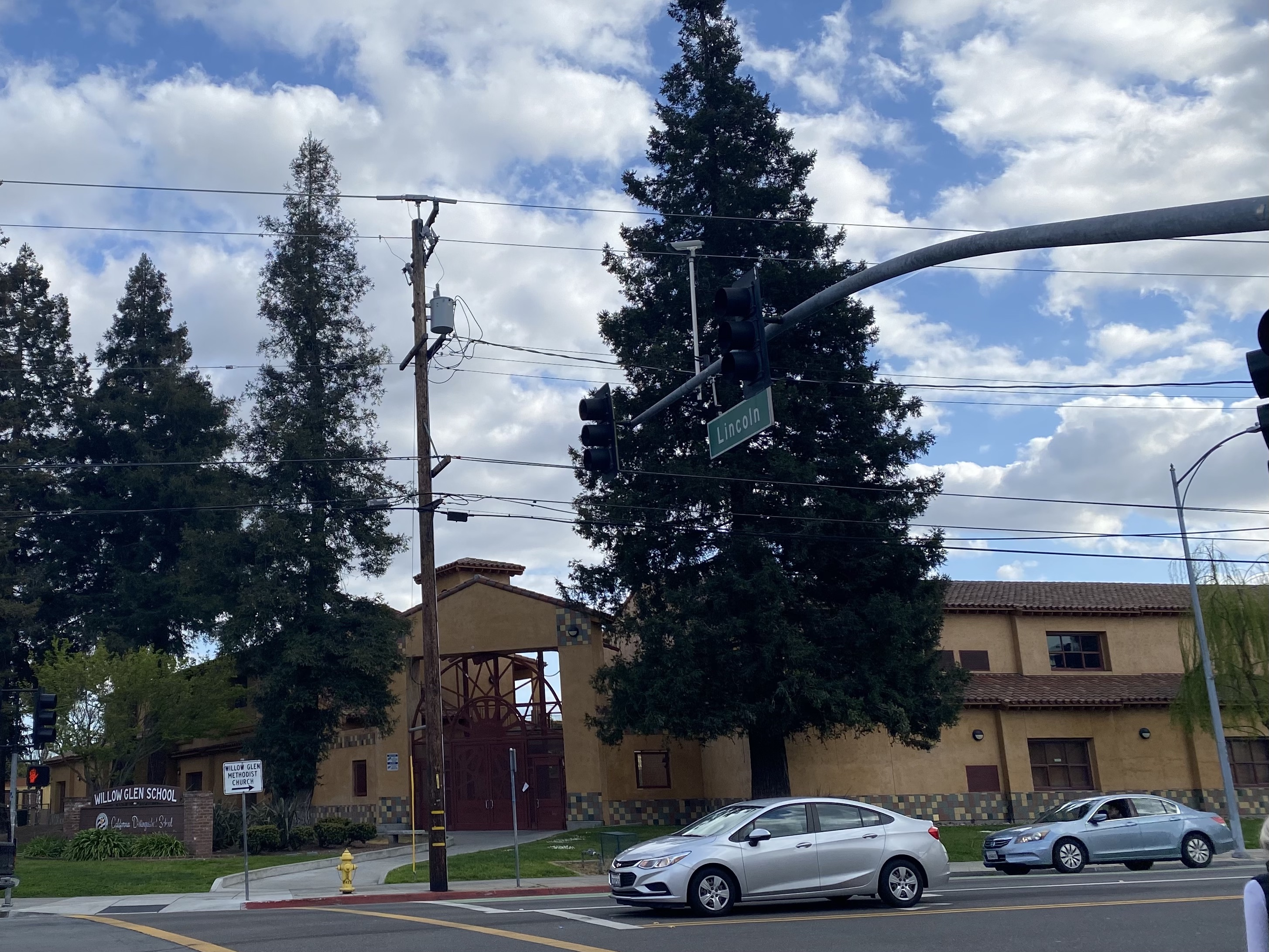
Willow Glen Elementary School.

- Willow Street Frank Bramhall Park
- Fuller Park
- River Glen Park
- Wallenberg Park & Garden
- Wilcox Park

=== Trails ===
The two sections of the Los Gatos Creek Trail terminate in Willow Glen. The connection requires on-street travel through much of Willow Glen.

One section of the Guadalupe River Trail terminates near the far north east edge of Willow Glen but otherwise does not run through it.

The Highway 87 Bikeway runs along the eastern edge of Willow Glen but terminates at Willow Street at its most northern point.

The Three Creeks Trail runs diagonally through Willow Glen and passes close to downtown.

== Transportation ==
VTA bus lines 25, 26, 56, 64A and 64B serve Willow Glen.

The VTA light rail's Blue Line runs down the middle of Highway 87 along Willow Glen's eastern border. The Green Line runs down Southwest Expressway, which makes up the northwest border of Willow Glen.

The following light rail stations are on the border of Willow Glen: Fruitdale, Curtner, Tamien, and Virginia.

Tamien station is also served by Caltrain. San Jose's main passenger rail station, San Jose Diridon, is approximately one mile north of Willow Glen's northern border.

== Notable residents ==
- Fred Warner – San Francisco 49ers player
