= Pedro Sainsevain =

American winemaker

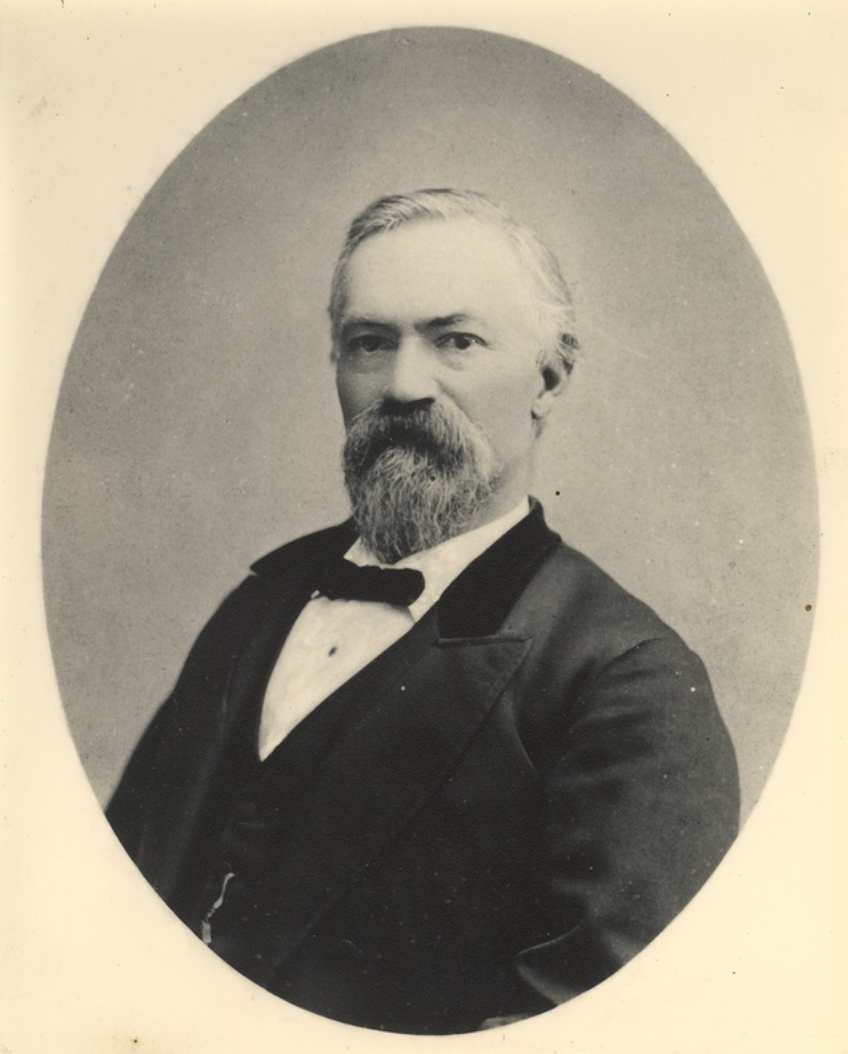
- Born: Pierre Sainsevain; November 20, 1818; Béguey, France
- Died: October 4, 1904 (aged 85)
- Occupations: Vintner, ranchero
- Spouse: Paula Suñol

Don Pedro Sainsevain (né Pierre; November 20, 1818 – October 4, 1904) was a French-born Californian vintner, ranchero, and a signer of the Californian Constitution in 1849. He is best known for his role in Californian winemaking, as one of the first producers of sparkling wine in California. He also was an early participant in the California Gold Rush.

== Life ==
Sainsevain, a carpenter, came from Bordeaux, France to Santa Barbara, California on the ship Ayacucho on July 4, 1839. He had been sent by his family to find his uncle Jean-Louis Vignes in Los Angeles. He settled on Vignes' property, El Aliso, and assisted with growing grapes and oranges, and with winemaking. In 1840, he loaded a shipment of wine and brandy on a ship to sell along the California coast. On this trip, he made his first visit to Monterey and Branciforte. In 1841 he worked at Vignes' sawmill near San Bernardino.

In 1843, Sainsevain was granted Rancho Cañada del Rincon en el Rio San Lorenzo near Santa Cruz, California by Governor Manuel Micheltorena, and in the Fall of 1843 he built one of the first sawmills in the valley of the San Lorenzo River, in association with Charles Roussillon, another Frenchman. In 1844, he was granted permission to start a flour mill with a daily capacity of 75 fanegas on the Guadalupe River in San Jose. In 1845, Sainsevain married Paula Suñol (1827–1883), whose father Antonio Suñol owned Rancho Los Coches. In 1846, Sainsevain and Charles Roussillon built a schooner (the Antonita) on the beach at Santa Cruz. She was launched on June 25, and sailed to the Sandwich Islands (Hawaii) to have a copper bottom installed. In 1847, Roussillon was the defendant in the first jury trial (Isaac Graham vs. Charles Roussillon) in California.

In 1848, Sainsevain and Roussillon went to the gold mines near Coloma. Sainsevain, Roussillon, Antonio Sunol, and Amador, with help from twenty-five Indians, mined gold at Don Pedro's Bar on the Tuolumne River. Sainsevain and Roussillon soon had enough of mining and returned to Stockton in 1849 to open a store supplying the California Gold Rush miners.

Sainsevain and Zepherin Rochon, a French-Canadian, owned a hotel in San Jose that became California's first State House. Sainsevain was a delegate to the 1849 California Constitutional Convention in Monterey.

== Wine ==
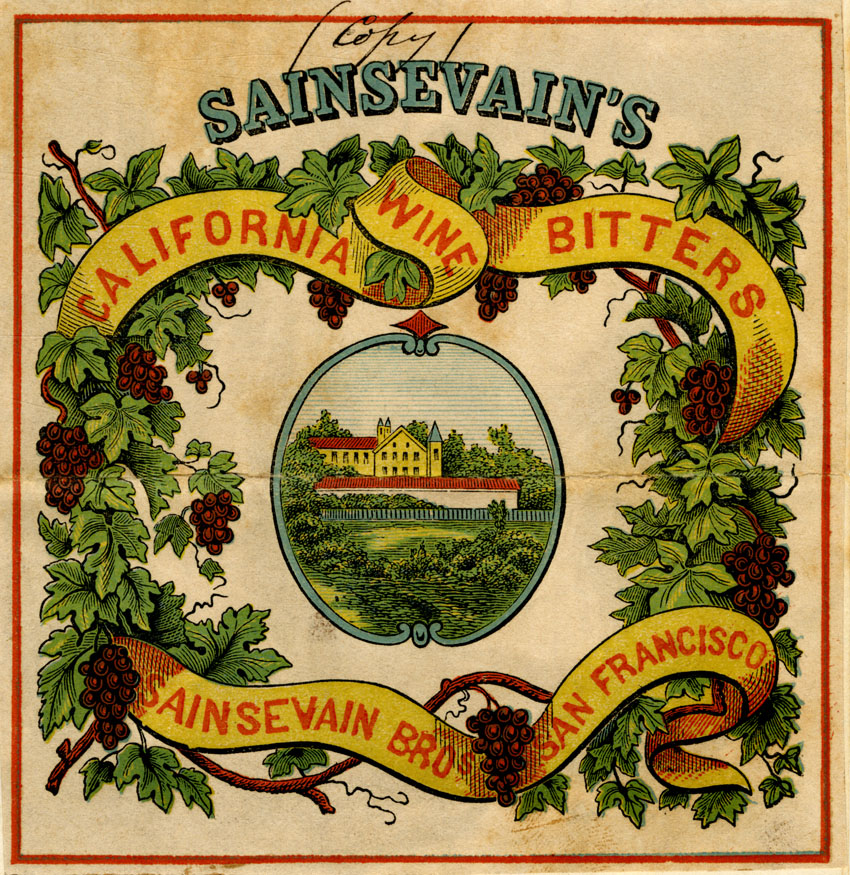
Trademark image for Sainsevain's Native California Wine Bitters (in the collection of the California State Archives)

In 1859, Sainsevain sold Rancho Cañada del Rincon en el Rio San Lorenzo, and with his brother, Jean Louis, bought the El Aliso vineyards in Los Angeles from their uncle, Jean-Louis Vignes (also known as "Don Luis Del Aliso"). The firm of Sainsevain Brothers immediately proceeded to expand the scale of operations at the old El Aliso vineyard. In 1857 they opened a store in San Francisco; and by 1858 they led the state with a production of 125,000 gallons of wine and brandy. In 1857, the San Francisco cellars of the Sainsevain Brothers produced champagne. However, it was not a success, and as a result of their investment in sparkling wine, Sainsevain Brothers was soon in financial difficulties. The partnership was dissolved in the 1860s, and only Jean Louis Sainsevain remained at the El Aliso property when it was sold in 1865.

In 1865 the Sainsevain brothers bought part of Rain's Rancho Cucamonga and set out a large vineyard. In 1868 his Claret won the title of best wine at the county fair. In 1870 the Sainsevain brothers moved to Cucamonga, and ran the vineyard and winery with Joseph S. Garcia. In 1874 the Sainsevains purchased land in Hawker Canyon four miles east of Etiwanda and built a large stone house and a reservoir.

In 1875, Pierre Sainsevain went to Central America, returning in 1880 to his Sainsevain Villa in San Jose. After his wife's death in 1883, he returned to France, where he spent the rest of his days.

== Legacy ==
The Don Pedro Reservoir behind the Don Pedro Dam takes its name from Don Pedros Bar mining town.

San Sevaine Flats and San Sevaine Lookout in the San Gabriel Mountains, Sainsevain street in Los Angeles (incorporated into Commercial Street), San Sevaine streets in Rancho Cucamonga, Mira Loma and Fontana, and the San Sevaine flood control channel and spreading grounds, are named (with misspelling) for the Sainsevain brothers.

== Jean Louis Sainsevain ==
Jean Louis Sainsevain (1817–1889) was born in Béguey, France a village near Bordeaux. He came to Los Angeles in 1855 to join his brother, Pierre. In 1868, Jean Louis Sainsevain was awarded a contract by the City of Los Angeles to create a new domestic water system.

== Bibliography ==
Notes

References

- Sullivan, Charles Lewis (1998). A companion to California wine: an encyclopedia of wine and winemaking from the mission period to the present (1998 ed.). University of California Press. ISBN 978-0-520-21351-7. - Total pages: 441

== See also ==
- California wine
- History of Los Angeles
