= Jean-Louis Vignes =

American winemaker

Jean-Louis Vignes (April 9, 1780 - January 17, 1862), also known as Don Luis del Aliso, was a French-born Californian vintner and ranchero. He was one of the first commercial wine makers in California and one of the first men to import and plant European Vitis vinifera grapes in the state. A skilled cooper by trade and an adventurer and entrepreneur by choice, he arrived in the Sandwich Islands on July 6, 1827. After losing his business in Honolulu due to Queen Ka'ahumanu's edict banning alcohol production, he sailed to California and landed at Pueblo de Los Angeles in 1831. In 1850, Vignes was the largest wine producer in California.

== Early years in France ==
Jean-Louis Vignes was born to Jean Vignes and Elizabeth Cato on April 9, 1780, in Béguey, a village downriver from Cadillac, Gironde near Bordeaux, France. He grew up with two brothers, Pierre and Pierre Esliens, and two sisters, both named Marie. The Vignes were artisans. They made barrels for the local wine industry, they raised their own wine, and they processed lees to manufacture wine lees ash, which was used to make fertilizer.

On 21 Pluviôse Year X, or February 10, 1802, Jean-Louis Vignes married Jeanne Simon, who was the daughter of Etienne Simon and Marie Laillou. They moved into the family house in Béguey which they acquired on December 30, 1816, along with its cellars and workshop, the vines, 3.2 acres (13,000 m^{2}) of ploughable lands, and "the copper brandy still that contains three barrels." Jean-Louis Vignes paid 2,100 Francs "in good metallic currency". His signature on the contract was adorned with the three dots of the Freemasons.

Jean-Louis Vignes became a local public figure. He was often a witness to marriages and contracts. In 1820, he managed the census in Cadillac, and his name stood prominently at the top of the list. At the end of 1820, his mortgages exceeded 20,000 francs and he ran into financial difficulties. On April 25, 1826, he stopped paying his father the pension he owed, and all his properties were mortgaged. He may also have had political troubles. Indeed, in 1824 the new king was the ultra-royalist Charles X, who, in an attempt to erase the effects of the Revolution, gave all the public jobs to nobles, and all the citizens who had held public positions under the Republic were considered suspect. Father Alexis Bachelot, who would hear Vignes in confession much later, wrote in a private letter: "Vignes was driven to leave his country after troubles caused by his loyalty, misunderstood considerateness, and too much facility to be of help."

== Sandwich Islands (Hawaii) ==
Jean-Louis Vignes obtained a passport in Bordeaux. He was described on the application as 45 years old, 5’8" tall, with brown hair and brown eyes, and an oval face with a big nose and a round chin. On November 17, 1826, he boarded the commerce vessel "Comète", which was under the command of Captain Antoine Plassiard. On November 20, 1826, the "Comète" left the Gironde estuary and entered the Atlantic Ocean with her approximately 30 passengers and her large crew. After stops at Isla de los Estados (Argentina), Valparaíso (Chile), Quilca and Callao (Peru) and Mazatlán (Mexico), the Comète landed in Honolulu on July 6, 1827. Jean-Louis Vignes settled to start a new life on a small property about three miles (5 km) from Honolulu and started raising sugar cane, vines, turkeys, and a few cattle. In October 1828, he was hired as manager of Oahu's rum distillery and sent 60 piasters to his family that had remained in France. However, the manufacture and sale of liquor did not sit well with the Reverend Hiram Bingham and his puritan flock. Reverend Bingham successfully pressured Queen Kaahumanu to outlaw the sale of rum. In December 1829, the distillery was closed and the sugar cane plantations were destroyed.

In 1830, Jean-Louis Vignes sailed from Oahu on the trading bark "Louisa", under the command of Captain George Wood. The vessel was owned by John Coffin Jones and was a permanent link between the islands and the west coast of North America. She had come from Boston with a cargo of assorted merchandise to trade in the Islands. Vignes landed in Monterey, Alta California, on June 26, 1831. On July 15, 1831, Vignes applied for a Mexican carta de seguridad, stating his occupation as cooper and distiller. Thereafter, he is often called Juan-Luis Vignes in period documents.

== Los Angeles ==
Upon arriving in Los Angeles in 1831, Jean-Louis Vignes bought 104 acres (0.42 km^{2}) of land located between the original Pueblo and the banks of the Los Angeles River. He planted a vineyard and started preparing to make wine. He named his property El Aliso after the centuries-old white alder tree found near the entrance.

The grapes available at the time, of the Mission variety, were brought to Alta California by the Franciscan Brothers at the end of the 18th century. They grew well and yielded large quantities of wine, but Jean-Louis Vignes was not satisfied with the results. Therefore, he decided to import better vines from Bordeaux, Cabernet Franc and Sauvignon blanc. The vines transited around Cape Horn. To preserve their roots during the long trip, they were inserted in moss and potato slices. Vignes became the first Californio who grew quality vines, and the first who aged his wines. The common practice at the time was to drink the wine as soon as it was fermented. The exact date of his first vintage is unknown. However, it was probably before 1837, because in 1857 he ran an advertisement claiming that some of his wines were 20 years old. The wood for the barrels came from land Vignes owned in the San Bernardino Mountains.

In 1840, Jean-Louis Vignes made the first recorded shipment of California wine. The Los Angeles market was too small for his production, and he loaded a shipment on the Monsoon, bound for Northern California. By 1842, he made regular shipments to Santa Barbara, Monterey and San Francisco. By 1849, El Aliso, was the most extensive vineyard in California. Vignes owned over 40,000 vines and produced 150,000 bottles, or 1000 barrels, per year.

As a prominent citizen of Los Angeles, Jean-Louis Vignes met and entertained such well known men as General William Tecumseh Sherman, Thomas Larkin, William Heath Davis and Thomas ap Catesby Jones. His wine was drunk all over California and samples were sent to President Tyler in Washington, D.C. and to France.

He was quite successful in agriculture. In 1834, he brought a few orange trees from Mission San Gabriel, and planted the first orange grove in Los Angeles. In 1851, he wrote that his two orange groves produced between 5000 and 6000 oranges per season. He also grew 400 peach trees, as well as apricots, pears, apples, figs, and walnuts.

Vignes was the patentee of both Rancho Temecula and the adjacent Rancho Pauba in the Temecula Valley.

In 1855, Jean-Louis Vignes sold El Aliso to his nephews Pierre Sainsevain and Jean-Louis Sainsevain for $40,000, the largest sum of money ever paid for real estate in California at the time. After his retirement, Vignes continued to be involved in the community. In 1856, he made a large gift to the Catholic Sisters of Charity to participate in the financing of the first hospital, which opened on May 31, 1858. He also contributed to the founding of the first Los Angeles public school.

Jean-Louis Vignes died in Los Angeles on January 17, 1862, at the age of 82.

== Family of immigrants ==
Proud of his achievements, Jean-Louis Vignes wrote to his family members back in Cadillac and urged them to join him in California. Almost twenty of them followed him: three of his five children (Marie, Jeanne, Jean) and their respective families; his youngest brother (Pierre Esliens); four nephews (Pierre Sainsevain, Jean-Louis Sainsevain, Jean-Marie Vignes, Vital Vignes) as well as numerous friends of the family. Jean-Louis's wife Jeanne never left France and died in Béguey in 1842.

The area around Vignes' estate had, by the 1850s, become the center of French settlers in Los Angeles, which fully numbered around one tenth of the European and Yankee population at the time, and was known as "French Town".

Vignes and Aliso Streets, in modern-day Los Angeles, commemorate Jean-Louis Vignes contribution to California's history and wine industry.

== Other names ==
Alternative names are often found in the literature and in official documents to refer to Jean-Louis Vignes. The most common are: Don Luis del Aliso.
