= List of pre-statehood mayors of San Jose =

This is a list of pre-statehood alcaldes and mayors of San Jose, from 1777 to 1850, during the Spanish, Mexican, and early American periods in Alta California, prior to California's admission to statehood.

== Spanish era ==
Alcaldes of San José
Alcalde	Term	Notes
José Manuel Gonzales	1785 - 1789	
Ignacio Archuleto	1803	
Luis María Peralta	1807-1821	
José Agustín Narváez	1821	

== Mexican era ==
Alcaldes of San José
Portrait	Alcalde	Term	Notes
	Francisco Castro	1822	
	Juan Alvires	1823	
	Ignacio Pacheco	1824	
	Joaquín Higuera	1825	
	Antonio Suñol	1826	
	Mariano Castro	1827	
	Juan Salvio Pacheco II	1828	
	Florentino Archuleta	1829	
	Mariano Castro	1830	
	Mariano Duarte	1831	
	Ignacio Ceballos	1832	
	Juan Salvio Pacheco II	1833	
	Pedro Chaboya	1834	
	Antonio María Pico	1835	
	José María Alviso	1836	
	Juan Alvires	1837	
	Dolores Pacheco	1838	
	José Noriega	1839	
	Dolores Pacheco	1840	
	Antonio Suñol	1841	
	Antonio Buelna	1842	
	Juan Salvio Pacheco II	1843	
	Antonio María Pico	1844-1845	
	John Burton	1846	

== American era ==
Alcaldes of San José
Portrait	Alcalde	Term	Notes
	John Burton	1847	
	Charles White	1848	
	K. H. Dimmick	1849	
	Richard M. May	1849	
	John C. Conroy	1849-1850	

== See also ==
- Mayor of San Jose
- List of pre-statehood mayors of Los Angeles
- List of pre-statehood mayors of San Francisco
- List of pre-statehood mayors of San Diego
