= Rancho Pescadero (Pico) =

Mexican land grant to Antonio María Pico in 1843

Coordinates: 37.810°N 121.440°W

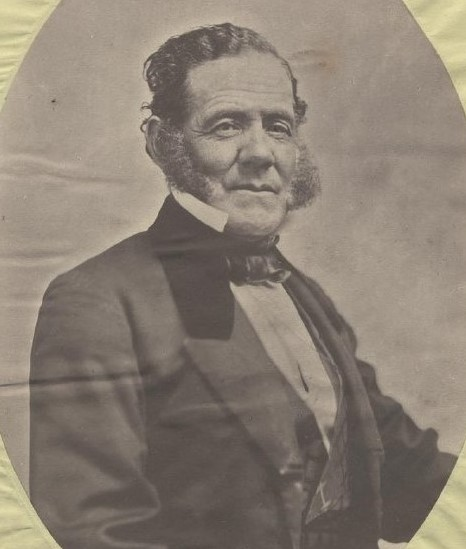
Antonio María Pico, a member of the prominent Pico family of California.

Rancho Pescadero was a 35,546-acre (143.85 km^{2}) Mexican land grant in present-day San Joaquin County, California and Alameda County, California given in 1843 by Governor Manuel Micheltorena to Antonio María Pico. Pescadero means "the fishery" or "the place to fish" in Spanish. The grant encompassed present-day Tracy.

== History ==
Antonio María Pico (1809–1869) was a member of the Pico family of California (a prominent Californio family), son of José Dolores Pico, and was stationed in the Pueblo of San José in 1833–1839. His brother, José de Jesús Pico, was the grantee of Rancho Piedra Blanca. Another brother was the bandit Salomon Pico. Antonio María Pico married Maria del Pilar Bernal (1812–1882) in 1831. He was alcalde at San Jose. Pico sold his one fourth share of Rancho Valle de San José to Juan Pablo Bernal. Pico received the eight square league Rancho Pescadero grant in 1843. He took part in the revolt against Governor Micheltorena in 1845, and was a member of the 1849 California Constitutional Convention. Antonio María Pico sold half the property to Henry Morris Naglee (1815–1886) in 1849.

With the cession of California to the United States following the Mexican-American War, the 1848 Treaty of Guadalupe Hidalgo provided that the land grants would be honored. As required by the Land Act of 1851, a claim for Rancho Pescadero was filed with the Public Land Commission in 1852. The claim was rejected by the Commission in 1854, on the grounds that failed grantees failed to perform. But grant was confirmed by the US District Court in 1856, and by the US Supreme Court; and the grant was patented to Antonio María Pico and Henry Morris Naglee in 1865.

Antonio María Pico sold his half the property to John C. Frémont in 1852. The grant was soon occupied by squatters and Frémont sold it in 1867 to Charles McLaughlin, who owned the adjacent Rancho Cañada de los Vaqueros.
