= Silicon Valley Historical Association =

Organization known for interviewing notable figures in Silicon Valley

- Founded: 1991
- Type: Non-profit organization
- Headquarters: Menlo Park, California, U.S.
- Website: www.siliconvalleyhistorical.org

The Silicon Valley Historical Association (also known as the Santa Clara Valley Historical Association) is an organization headquartered in Menlo Park, California, that has interviewed notable figures in Silicon Valley since 1991 and produces documentaries, publishes books, and keeps filmed history of notable figures in the technological industry.

== Overview ==
The Silicon Valley Historical Association was formed in 1991 and is located in Menlo Park, California. It publishes books, produces documentaries and records filmed histories of notable tech industry figures who have contributed to the development of the tech industry. The association's mission is to record the motivations, successes, failures, mentors, and experiences of the individuals who have directly contributed to the Information Age, Computer Age, and Digital Age. The association draws parallels between the information revolution that took place during the Renaissance and the current development of technology in Silicon Valley.

Tech industry figures such as Hewlett-Packard founders David Packard and Bill Hewlett, Intel founders Gordon E. Moore and Andy Grove, Apple founder Steve Jobs, Oracle Corporation founder Larry Ellison, Atari and Chuck E. Cheese founder Nolan Bushnell, venture capitalist Arthur Rock, disk drive inventor Reynold B. Johnson, Sun Microsystems founder Vinod Khosla and many others have been interviewed by the association.

A 1994 interview of the late Apple founder Steve Jobs was "discovered" by the international news media in 2013. Part of the video was included in a YouTube clip which generated interest by numerous Apple-focused blogs, including The Loop, Mac Rumors, Apple Insider as an interview that had never been seen before. It was released through the Silicon Valley Historical Association as Steve Jobs 1994 Uncut Interview.

Portions of the interview were used in the 2013 documentary, Steve Jobs: Visionary Entrepreneur, also produced by the association.

== Documentaries ==
In addition to Steve Jobs 1994 Uncut Interview and Steve Jobs: Visionary Entrepreneur, the Silicon Valley Historical Association has also produced:

- Silicon Valley: 100 Year Renaissance, narrated by Walter Cronkite, broadcast on PBS and internationally, produced 1998.
- Silicon Valley, a five-part series, narrated by Leonard Nimoy, produced 2012.

=== Short films ===
- Jerry Garcia's Last Interview – produced 2012.

== Publications ==
- Winslow, Ward; McLaughlin, John (1996). The Making of Silicon Valley: A 100 Year Renaissance.
- VARIAN: 50 Years of Innovative Excellence: A History of Varian Associates, Inc. from 1948 to 1998 Author: Ward Winslow. 1998.
- Technology, Entrepreneurs and Silicon Valley Authors: Carol Whiteley and John McLaughlin. 2002.
- The Casino’s Most Valuable Chip Author: Sal Sheri. 2004.
- Silicon Valley: 110 Year Renaissance Authors: John McLaughlin, Leigh Weimers, and Ward Winslow. 2008.

== See also ==
- California Pioneers of Santa Clara County
- List of historical societies in California
