= California Pioneers of Santa Clara County =

Organization in California

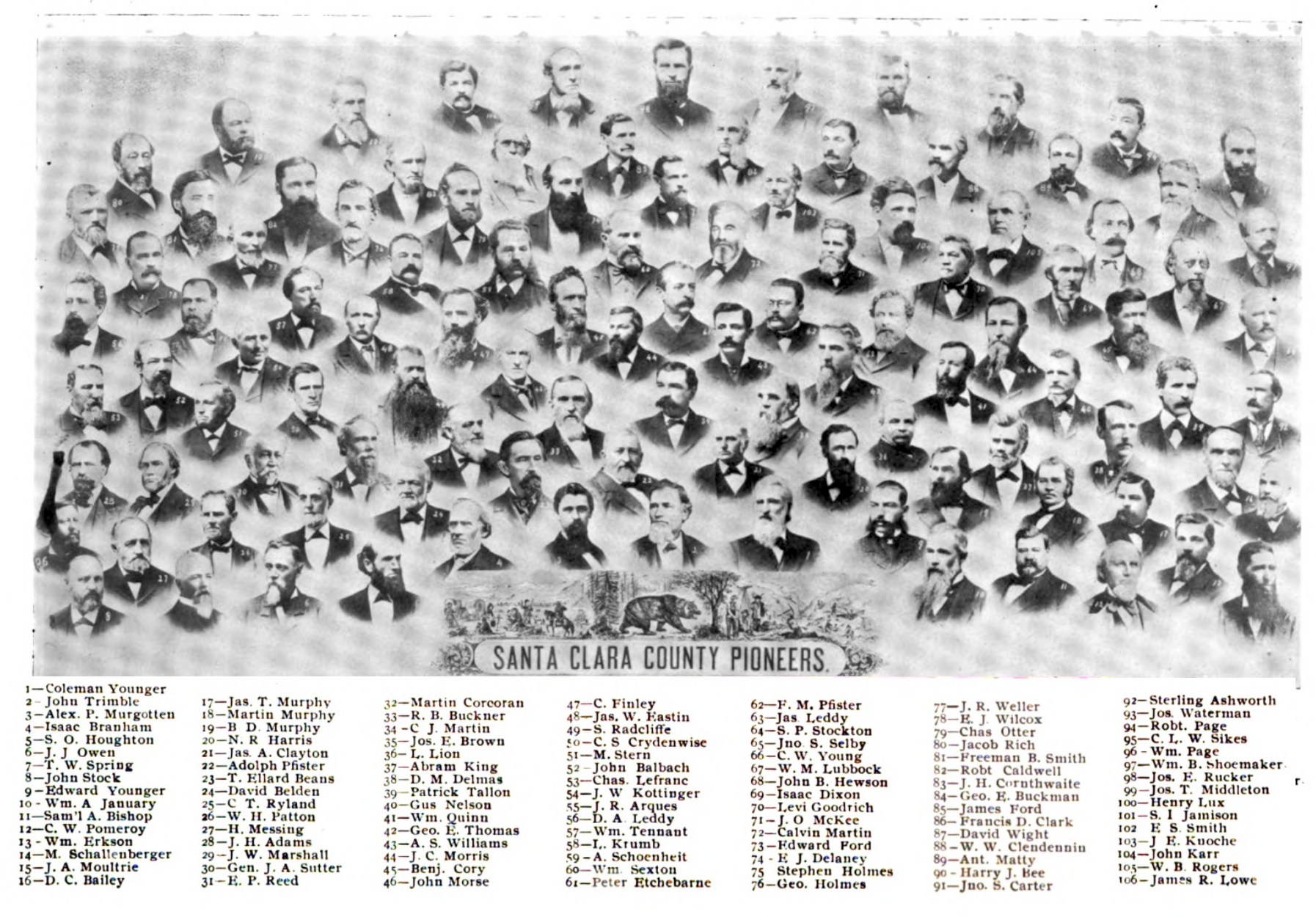
- Abbreviation: SCC Pioneers
- Formation: June 22, 1875; 150 years ago
- Headquarters: San Jose, California
- Location: United States
- Website: californiapioneers.com

California Pioneers of Santa Clara County (SCC Pioneers) is a historical society focused on Santa Clara County, California founded on June 22, 1875, and is headquartered in San Jose, California. Today the society operates a public museum, library and educational outreach center. Additionally the SCC Pioneers has published a journal since 1875.

== History ==
=== 19th century ===
The California Pioneers of Santa Clara County was formed on June 22, 1875, with 274 charter members, with membership primary held by people of European heritage. The first member of leadership for the California Pioneers of Santa Clara County was led by president Judge Augustus Loring Rhodes; vice presidents John M. Murphy, and Peter Overton Minor; secretary Alexander Philip Murgotten; treasurer John H. Moore; and directors Coleman Younger, Carey Peebels, Davis Divine, Adolph Pfister, and Bernard D. Murphy. The first meeting was held at O'Donnell's Garden on June 22, 1876.

=== 20th century ===
Austen D. Warburton (1917–1995) was a former president of the SCC in the 1960s, an author and he was a descent of H.H. Warburton, the first physician in Santa Clara County. Austen D. Warburton has a historical marker in his honor erected in 1996 by Santa Clara Historical and Landmark Commission in Santa Clara, California. The Warburton/Peddy Award (formerly the Austen D. Warburton Pioneer Award) was established in 1987 and is awarded by the SCC Pioneer board of directors.

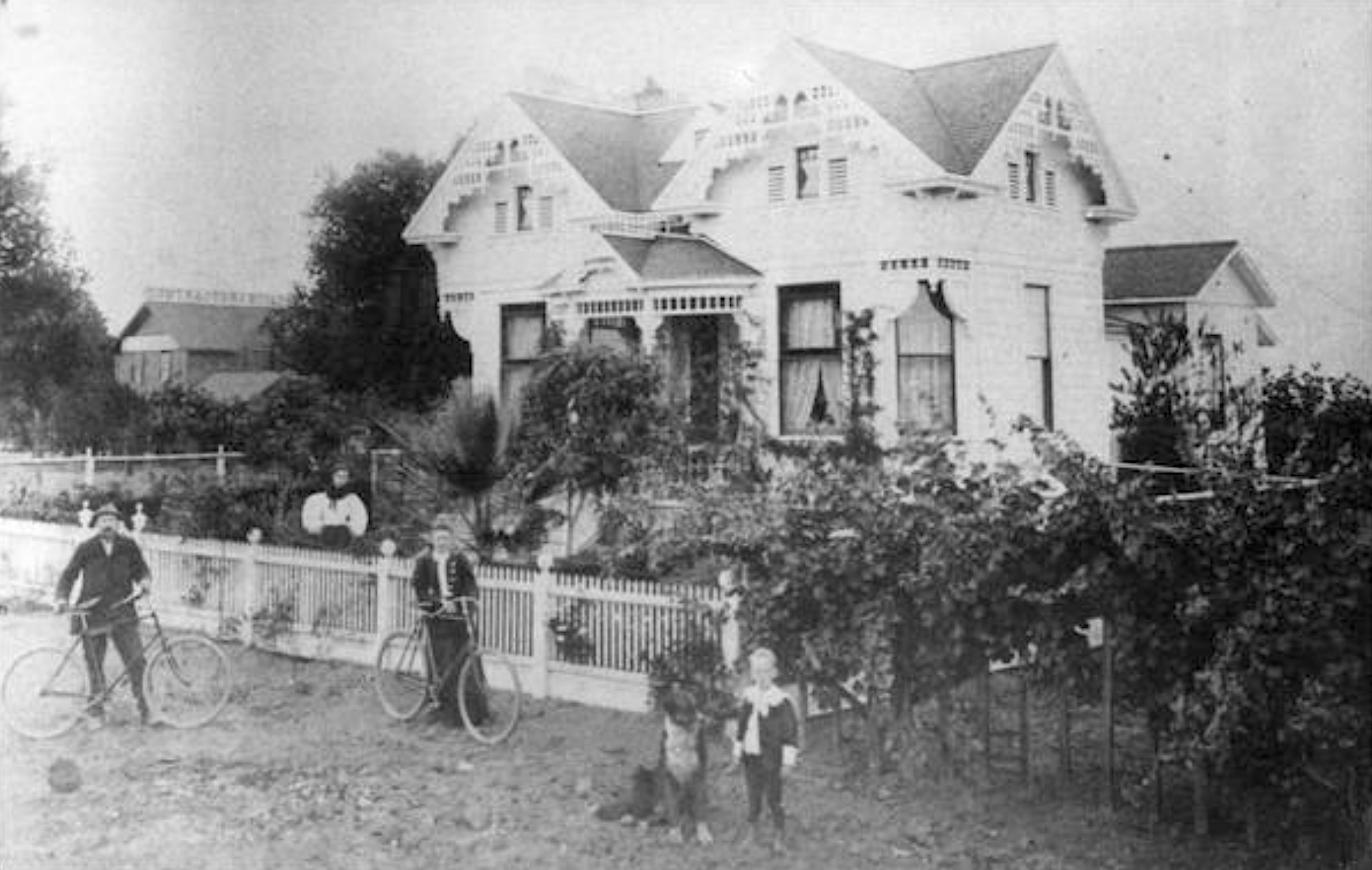
The former E. J. Parrish House (1895–1977), Cupertino, California

In 1975, the City of Cupertino took a vote on saving the historic Enoch J. Parrish House (1895) in Cupertino. The SCC Pioneers voiced their support in saving the structure, but voted no support in rebuilding the house, however it burned down in 1977. The former E.J. Parrish House property is now the site of the Cupertino Senior Center.

The SCC Pioneers contributed towards the erection of the historical marker in 2013 at the Alviso Marina County Park, commemorating the 1853 Steamboat Jenny Lind explosion that killed many.

In 2013, SCC Pioneers acquired the Roberto Adobe and Suñol House in San Jose (the former Rancho Los Coches) through donations by the Bruzzone family.

== See also ==
- List of historical societies in California
- Silicon Valley Historical Association
- Society of California Pioneers
- Indigenous peoples of California
