= Roberto-Suñol Adobe =

Historic house in California, United States

- U.S. National Register of Historic Places
- California Historical Landmark
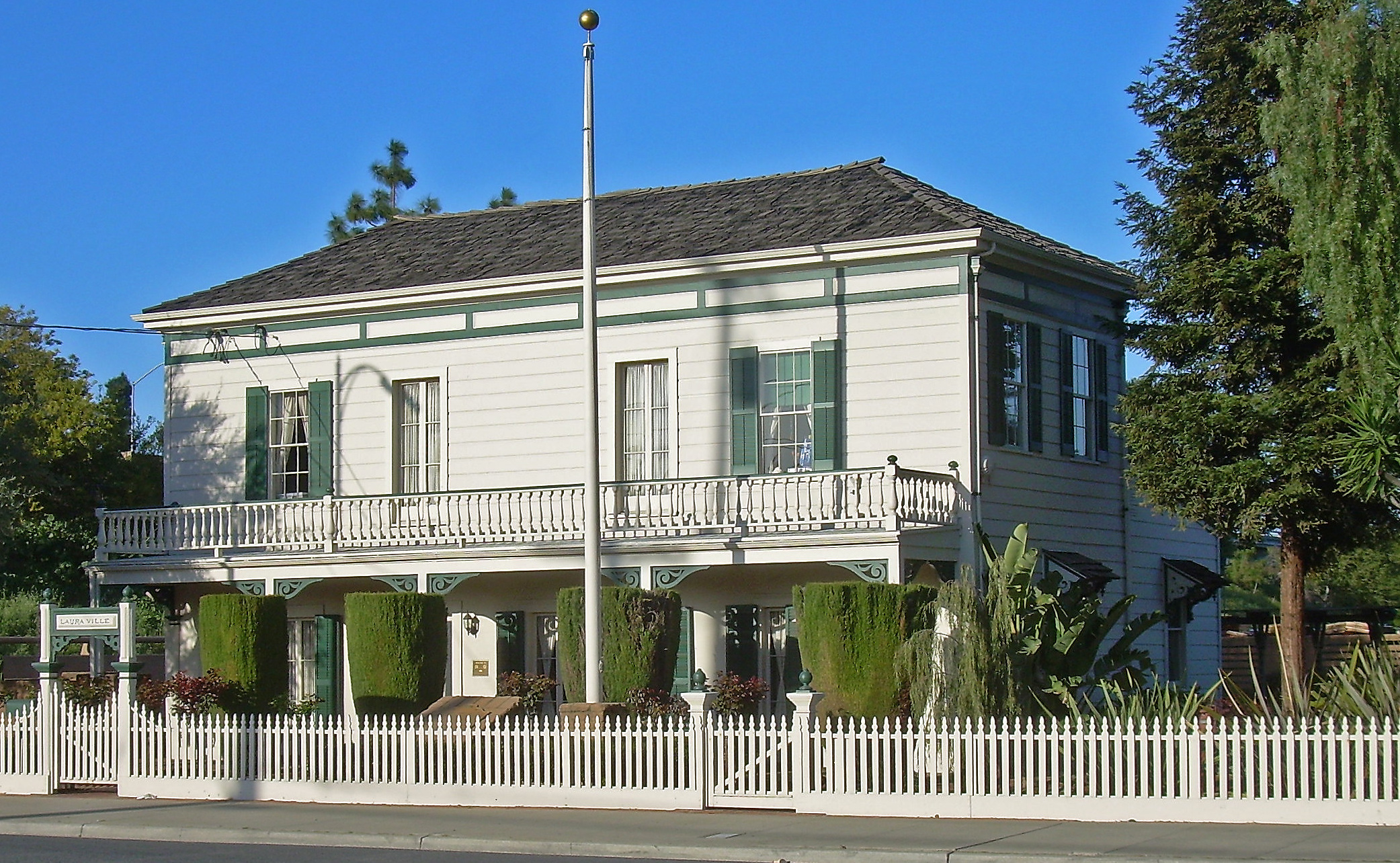
- Roberto-Sunol House

- Location within San Jose, California Location within California
- Location: 770 Lincoln Avenue, Willow Glen, San Jose, California, US
- Coordinates: 37°18′58″N 121°54′22″W
- Area: 4 acres (1.6 ha)
- Built: 1836
- Website: californiapioneers.com/visit/roberto-adobe-sunol-house-museum/
- NRHP reference No.: 77000344
- CHISL No.: 898

Significant dates
- Added to NRHP: March 17, 1977
- Designated CHISL: 1976

The Roberto-Suñol Adobe, also known as the Roberto Adobe & Suñol House is a historic adobe dwelling located in San Jose, California, within the former Rancho Los Coches. The house was built in 1836 by Roberto Balermino (Tamien of the Ohlone tribe), fourteen years before California's admittance to the Union. Then in 1847, Spanish-born Antonio Suñol built the adjoining brick Suñol House. The California Pioneers of Santa Clara County, a non-profit organization, obtained this property with the intention of establishing a no-cost museum for the public's benefit. The adobe is a California Historical Landmark and was placed on the National Register of Historic Places listings in Santa Clara County, California on March 17, 1977.

== History ==
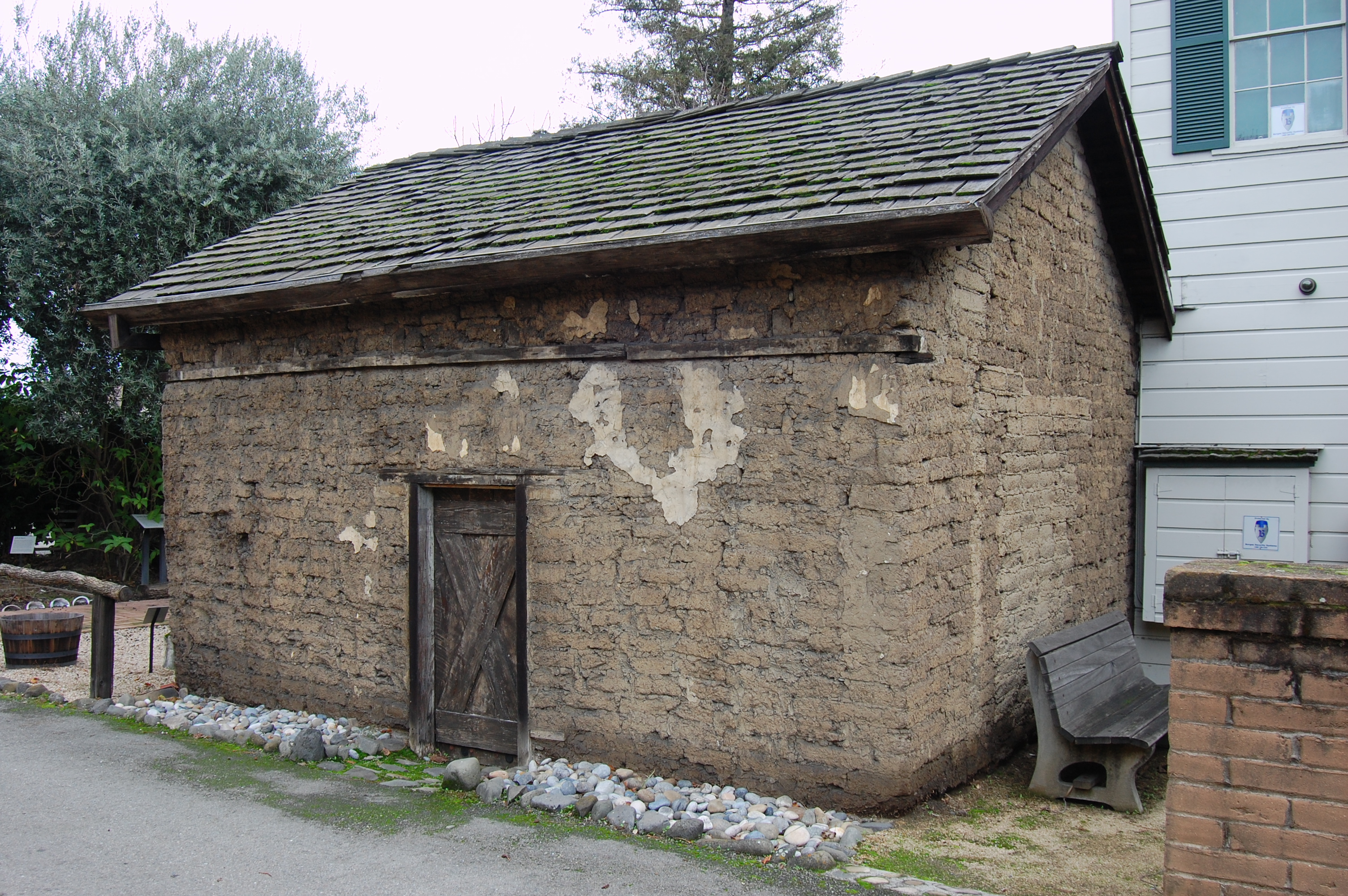
Roberto Balermino adobe house, built in 1836.

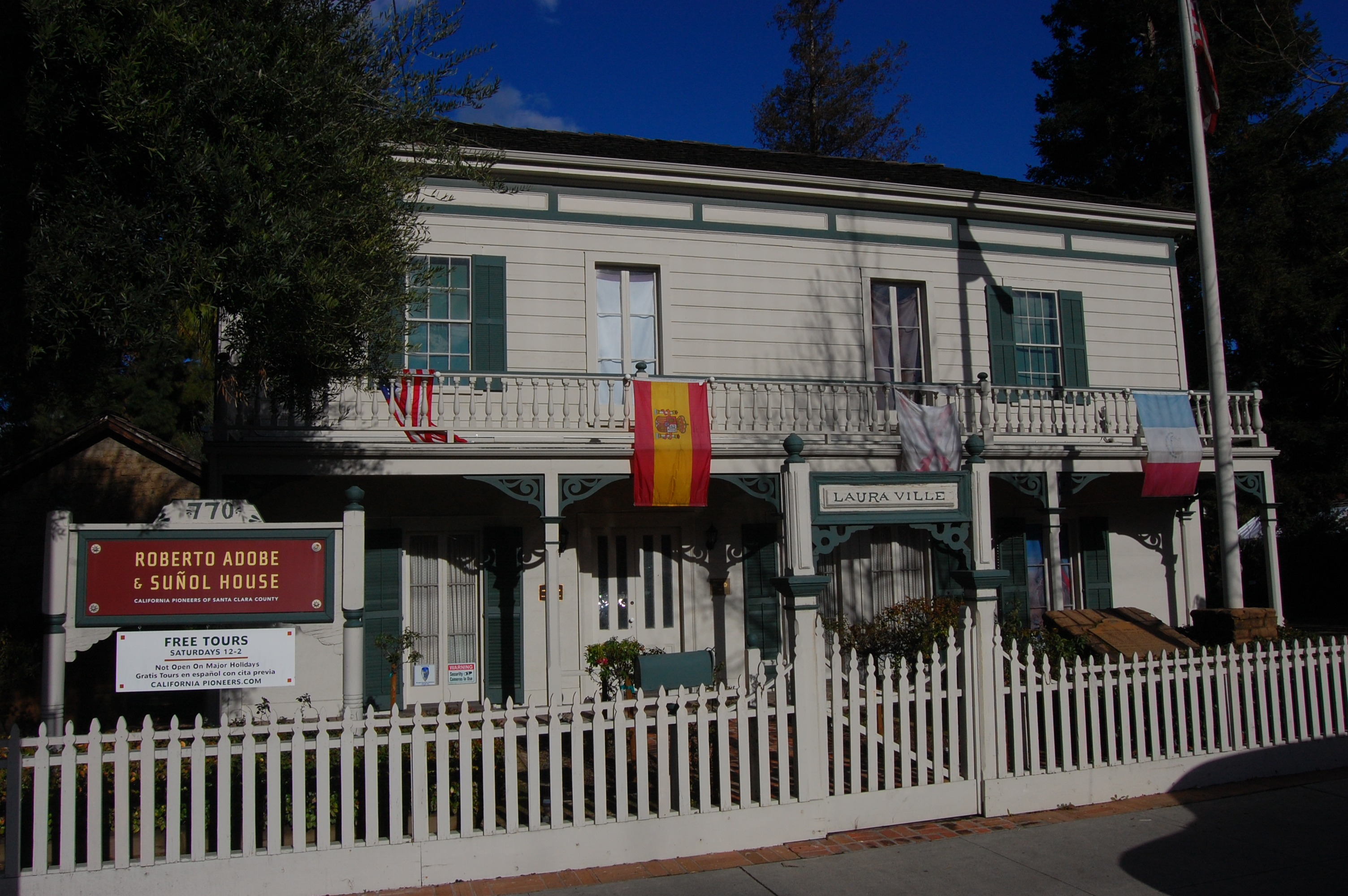
The Antonio Suñol House, built in 1847.

Roberto Balermino (Tamien of the Ohlone tribe) built the one-story Roberto Adobe in 1836, on the Rancho Los Coches ("Ranch of the Pigs"), now the Midtown San Jose and Willow Glen neighborhoods of San Jose, California land grant property. The 2,219 acres (898 ha) of land was officially granted to Balermino by Governor Manuel Micheltorena in 1844. Balermino lived in the adobe structure with his family from 1836 until 1847.

Spanish-born businessman Don Antonio Suñol (1796–1865) obtained the Rancho Los Coches in 1847 from Balermino in payment of a debt. Suñol built the adjoining brick Suñol House in 1847. It was the first brick house to be completed in Alta California.

The adobe house became a California Historical Landmark in 1976, and was placed on the National Register of Historic Places listings in Santa Clara County, California on March 17, 1977. A historic marker, number 898, was erected in front of the Suñol House in 1977.

In 1853, the Suñol home and the adjacent ranch were sold to Captain Stefano Splivalo, a Dalmatian sea captain. Splivalo made several modifications to the property, including adding a second story, a balcony, and covering the brick walls with wooden siding. During the 1870s, he expanded the house with the addition of three eastern rooms.

The Splivalo family lived in the house for 40 years. After the Captain died in 1891, the house passed through several hands. In 1906, Julio Bassoni, an Italian immigrant, became the owner of the houses and the accompanying four-acre property. He, along with his descendants, maintained a traditional Willow Glen orchard on this land until 1966.

In 1934, the Bruzzone family settled on Willow Street in San José. John Bruzzone Sr. eventually inherited the family business and became the owner of the land situated behind the adobe home site. It wasn't until 1973 that Bruzzone first encountered the adobe dwelling and Splivalo's home, known as "Laura Ville." Recognizing the uniqueness of these structures, he dedicated time and resources to restore them. To accomplish this, he hired an adobe-architecture specialist Gilbert Sanchez, an architect, and a contractor. Together, they undertook a restoration of the Roberto Adobe & Suñol House. Their process involved lifting the second story off the first story, reinforcing the building with concrete and steel, and then placing the second story back onto the first. The restored buildings were officially reopened to the public in 1977. Subsequently, Laura Ville was leased for use as law offices, a role it served until 2012.

=== California Pioneers of Santa Clara County ===
The California Pioneers of Santa Clara County, a non-profit organization, established a no-cost Roberto Adobe & Suñol House Museum in August 2016.

== See also ==
- California Historical Landmarks in Santa Clara County
- National Register of Historic Places listings in Santa Clara County, California
