= Palm Haven, San Jose =

Palm Haven
- Neighborhood of San Jose
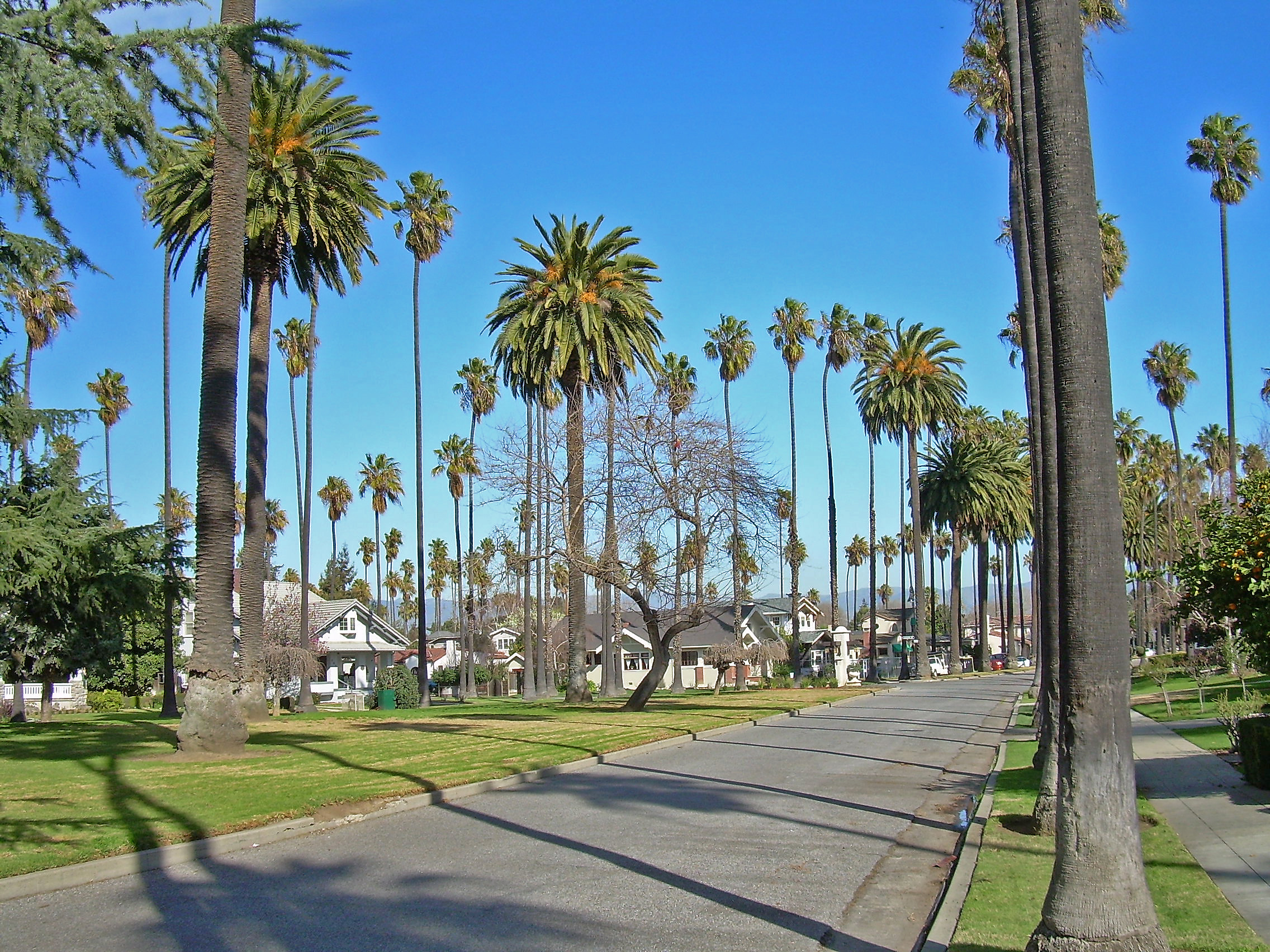

- Location within San Jose
- Coordinates: 37.31571°N 121.89957°W
- Country: United States
- State: California
- County: Santa Clara
- City: San Jose

Palm Haven is a historic residence park and neighborhood in the Willow Glen district of San Jose, California.

== History ==
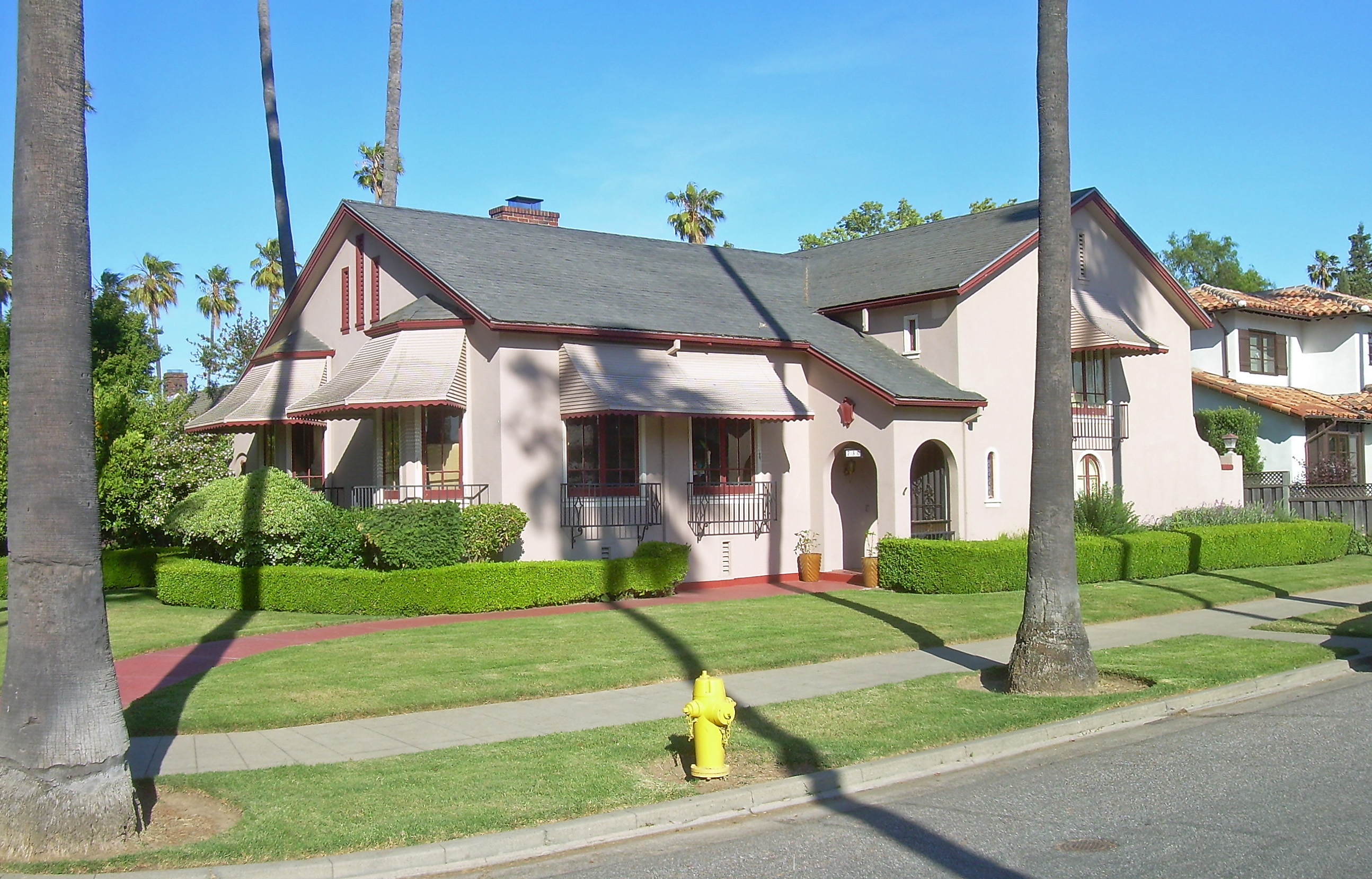
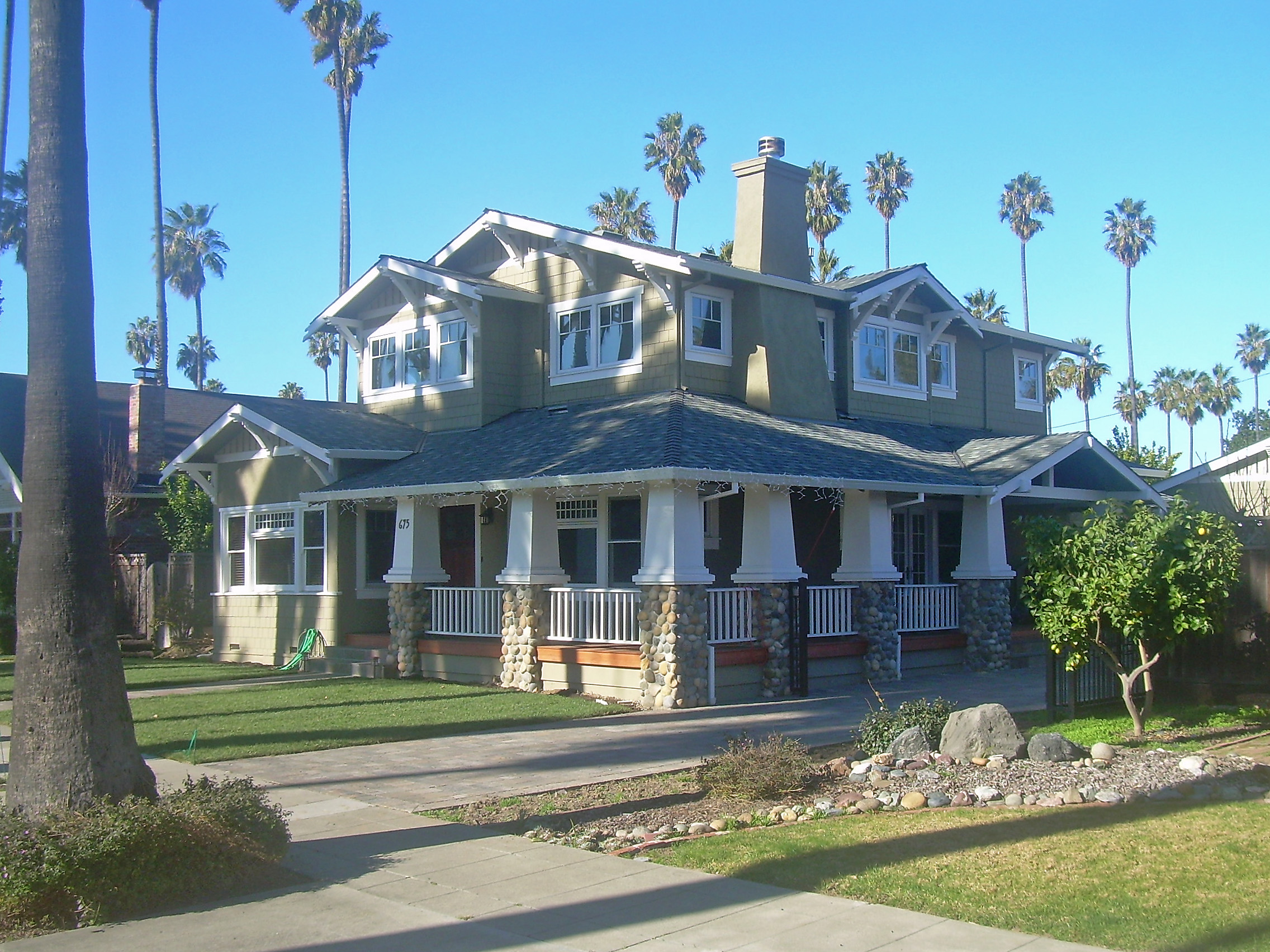
Palm Haven is home to numerous historic homes.

Established in 1913 on the edge of the city, Palm Haven was considered the quintessential "Residence Park".

Developers Eaton, Vestal, and Herschbach built Palm Haven with wide parkways planted with Mexican Fan Palms and Canary Island date palms at equal intervals. The entrances to the development were marked by large, Mission-Revival styled concrete pillars adorned with large urns, plants and electric lanterns.

A covered waiting station in the same Mission-Revival style was built on an island at the foot of the Palm Haven Avenue entrance for a Palm Haven stop on the Peninsular Railway.

The center of the neighborhood contains a plaza planted in a formal style creating sight lines and symmetry.

Common to Residence Parks, Palm Haven had a set of conditions, covenants and restrictions that controlled what was built, a minimum cost, property setbacks, and racial exclusions.

The neighborhood is largely intact today as its palm trees are now fully grown at approximately 100 feet tall. All the original trees from the 1913 planting are designated "Heritage Trees" by the City of San Jose and are the largest coordinated tree planting within city limits.

The neighborhood is a designated Historic Conservation Area in the City of San Jose.

== Notable residents ==
Many important figures in local history with regional and even national impacts lived in Palm Haven including:

- Lewis Dan Bohnett - Attorney and statesman who led the fight to stop the Southern Pacific Railroad from running straight through Willow Glen and Palm Haven. He succeeded in getting Willow Glen incorporated as a city and took the legal fight all the way to the U.S. Supreme Court and won.
- Herman Krause - Celebrated area designer of premium residential and commercial installations in the San Jose area during the early 20th century.
- Frank Delos Wolfe - Noted area architect lived in Palm Haven and designed many homes there along with hundreds in the San Jose and San Francisco Bay Area. Work spans late 19th century to 1925. Some innovations previously credited to Frank Lloyd Wright have been found to be firsts with Frank Delos Wolfe. Several structures are listed on the National Register of Historic Places as well as California & San Jose registers.
