= Béguey =

- Commune
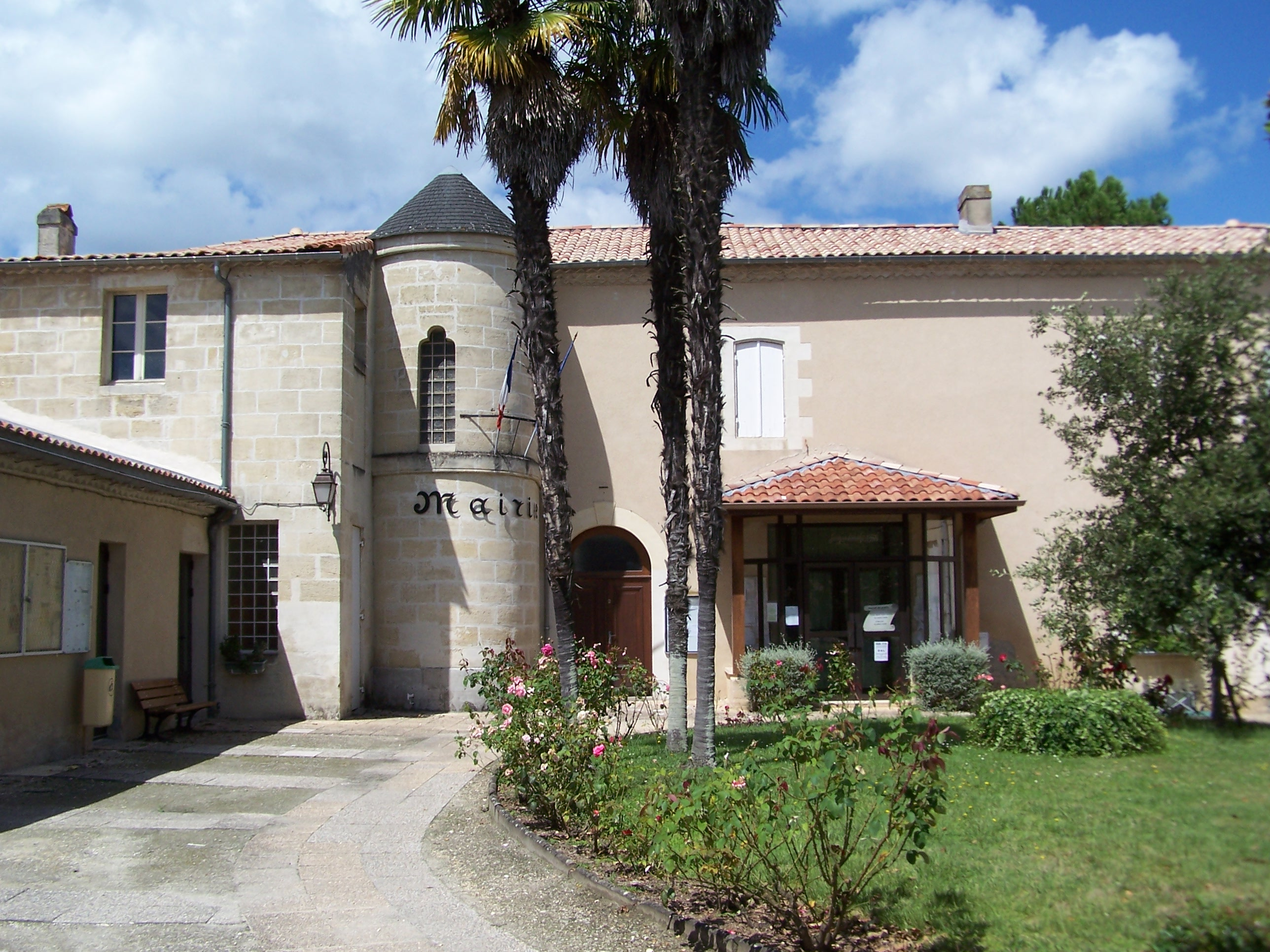
- The town hall in Béguey
- Location of Béguey
- Location within France Location within Nouvelle-Aquitaine
- Coordinates: 44°38′37″N 0°19′20″W
- Country: France
- Region: Nouvelle-Aquitaine
- Department: Gironde
- Arrondissement: Langon
- Canton: L'Entre-Deux-Mers

Government
  - Mayor (2020–2026): Rodolphe Yung
- Area^{1}: 3.16 km^{2} (1.22 sq mi)
- Elevation: 20 m (66 ft)
- Highest elevation: 90 m (300 ft)
- Lowest elevation: 2 m (6.6 ft)
- Population (2023): 1,308
  - Density: 414/km^{2} (1,070/sq mi)
- Time zone: UTC+01:00 (CET)
  - Summer (DST): UTC+02:00 (CEST)
- INSEE/Postal code: 33040 /33410
- ^{1} French Land Register data, which excludes lakes, ponds, glaciers > 1 km^{2} (0.386 sq mi or 247 acres) and river estuaries.

Béguey (French pronunciation: [beɡɛj]; Occitan: Veguèir) is a commune on the right bank of the Garonne river in the Gironde department in southwestern France.

== Geography ==
On the right bank of the Garonne, the neighboring towns are Laroque to the north-east, Cadillac to the south-east, and Rions to the north-west; on the right bank, the neighboring municipalities are Cérons to the south-west and Podensac to the west.

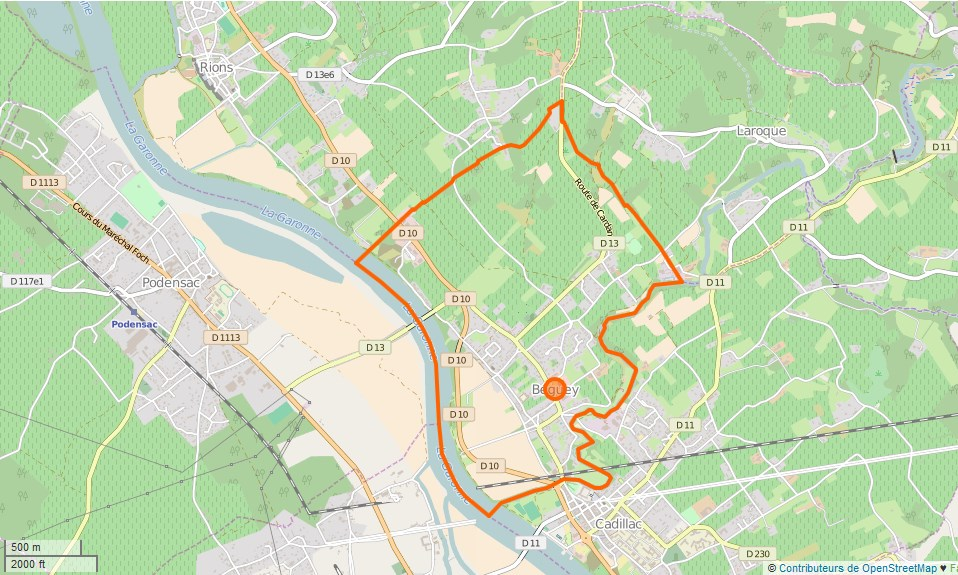
OpenStreetMap communal limit

== Population ==
Historical population
Year	Pop.	±% p.a.
1968	974	—
1975	1,054	+1.13%
1982	866	−2.77%
1990	910	+0.62%
1999	916	+0.07%
2007	1,079	+2.07%
2012	1,147	+1.23%
2017	1,187	+0.69%
2023	1,308	+1.63%
Source: INSEE

== Personalities ==
One of Béguey's famous sons is Jean-Louis Vignes, pioneer of the California wine industry.

== See also ==
- Communes of the Gironde department
