= Residence park =

Residence Parks, also known as garden suburbs, were residential developments that were built around the early 1900s in North America. Most were built prior to World War I and those that had not already sold most of their lots suffered considerable financial loss due to the dramatic downturn in real estate sales during the war. It is possible that this downturn discouraged any further creation of these developments after the war.

== Characteristics ==
Residence Parks were characterized by their use of conditions, covenants and restrictions ("CC&R"s) in order to ensure that the neighborhood reflected certain styles of architecture and standards of development. The restrictions frequently extended to the exclusion of certain racial minorities as was common for the period and locale. They typically included enhanced public spaces that ranged from entrance "gateway" structures to landscaped boulevards and park areas to clubhouses.

The idea that a person did not have to pack up and go to a park but actually live in one was part of the attraction. Therefore, considerable attention was paid to the layout of streets, their width, the parkways, sidewalks, lighting, and an overall landscape plan often designed by a respected landscape architect. These embellishments and standards of development came with a price and therefore Residence Parks were marketed primarily to affluent buyers.

== Impact ==
Before World War I, cities in North America typically did not zone land for development or have planning guidelines that determined what could be built where and in what form. The early conditions, covenants, and restrictions of Residence Parks were likely the precursor to the standard use of zoning and planning rules in cities today.

The impact of Residence Park "living" was felt for years in real estate developments. Attaching the word "Park" to the end of the name of a residential development became very popular and resulted in distorting its original meaning. Developers and real estate agents started to use the term Residence Park to assign the same prestige for just about every development being built. These later developments typically had none of the elements of the original Residence Parks. They were simply coordinated tract developments with, at most, trees planted in the parkways.

In the recent decades (1980s–1990s) some planned residential developments take on some of the ideas of the original Residence Parks. They have formal entrances with structure(s) and landscaping announcing you are entering the tract. They often have a carefully planned street layout that tends toward winding curves. Some include clubhouses and/or a central park. But many of these features are often at the demands of the local city when approving the project and consequently take on a generic city-park appearance. And since the developments are typically created by large companies looking to maximize the return on their investment, they build the houses too. As a result, there are often rows and rows of houses with minor variations.

The original Residence Parks are markedly different in that the developer typically installed the streets, the utilities, and the public spaces. Then they sold the lots individually and would often require the lot owners to submit architectural plans for review prior to building. The subjective review was to maintain a certain aesthetic standard and/or style for the development. There were also requirements such as minimum cost of construction of a new home, maximum height, number of structures per lot, property uses and so on. This resulted in a much richer variety in the architecture and a more visually appealing streetscape.

Some Residence Parks still survive today and though most of the CC&Rs have expired, the streetscape and architecture has often survived to maintain the park-like atmosphere.

== See also ==
- Residence Park - New Rochelle, NY (The prototype, 1885)
- Llewellyn Park, West Orange, New Jersey
- Palm Haven, San Jose, California
- Ingleside Terraces, San Francisco
- Shasta/Hanchett Park, San Jose, California
- St. Francis Wood, San Francisco, California
- Balboa Terrace, San Francisco, California
- Forest Hill, San Francisco, California
- Westwood Park, San Francisco, California
- Presidio Terrace, San Francisco, California
- Sea Cliff, San Francisco, California
- Venice Canal Historic District, Venice, Los Angeles, California
- Palos Verdes Estates, California
- Roland Park, Baltimore, Maryland
- Guilford, Baltimore, Maryland
- Druid Hills Historic District, Atlanta, Georgia
- Country Club District, Kansas City, Missouri
- Mission Hills, Kansas
- Shadyside, Houston, Texas
- River Oaks, Houston, Texas
- Brendonwood Historic District, Indianapolis, Indiana
- Great Neck Estates, New York
- Plandome Heights, New York
- Flower Hill, New York
- Plandome Manor, New York
- Forest Hills, Queens, New York
- Brightwaters, Islip, New York
- Boca Raton, Florida
- Mountain Lake, Florida
- Miami Springs, Florida
- Opa-locka, Florida
- Miami Shores, Florida
- Hollywood, Florida
- Miami Beach, Florida
- Bal Harbour, Florida
- Coral Gables, Florida
- The Highlands, Seattle, Washington
- Sudbrook Park, Pikesville, Maryland
- Riverside Historic_District, Riverside, Illinois
