= Antonio María Pico =

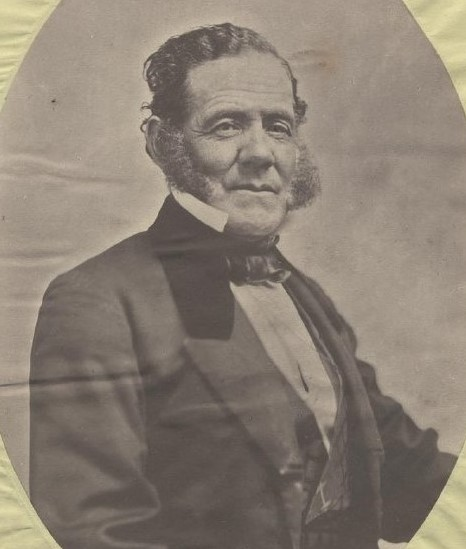

Alcalde of San José
- In office 1835
- Preceded by: Pedro Chaboya
- Succeeded by: José María Alviso
- In office 1844–1845
- Preceded by: Juan Salvio Pacheco II
- Succeeded by: John Burton

Personal details
- Born: 1808 Monterey, California
- Died: 23 May 1869 (aged 60–61) San Jose, California
- Profession: Politician, ranchero

Don Antonio María Pico was a Californio politician, ranchero, and a signer of the California Constitution in 1849. He also served twice as Alcalde of San José.

== Biography ==
Antonio María Pico, a member of the prominent Pico family of California, was born in 1808 in Monterey, California. He was a son of José Dolores Pico and his wife, the former Maria Ysabel de la Asención Cota.

In 1824, Pico left Monterey to serve as a bookkeeper at Mission San Juan Capistrano.

He served as Alcalde of San José (mayor of San Jose) in 1835 and 1844–1845.

Governor Manuel Micheltorena granted Rancho Pescadero (present day city of Tracy, California) in 1843.

He was elected as a delegate for Santa Clara County to the Monterey Constitutional Convention of 1849 and was a signer of the California Constitution.

In 1859, he led a petition of Californio rancheros to the U.S. Congress describing their taxation as unduly high.

He was elected to the Electoral College in 1860 as an elector for Abraham Lincoln.

Pico died in San Jose on 23 May 1869.
