= Rancho Los Coches =

Mexican land grant in California

Coordinates: 37.320°N 121.910°W

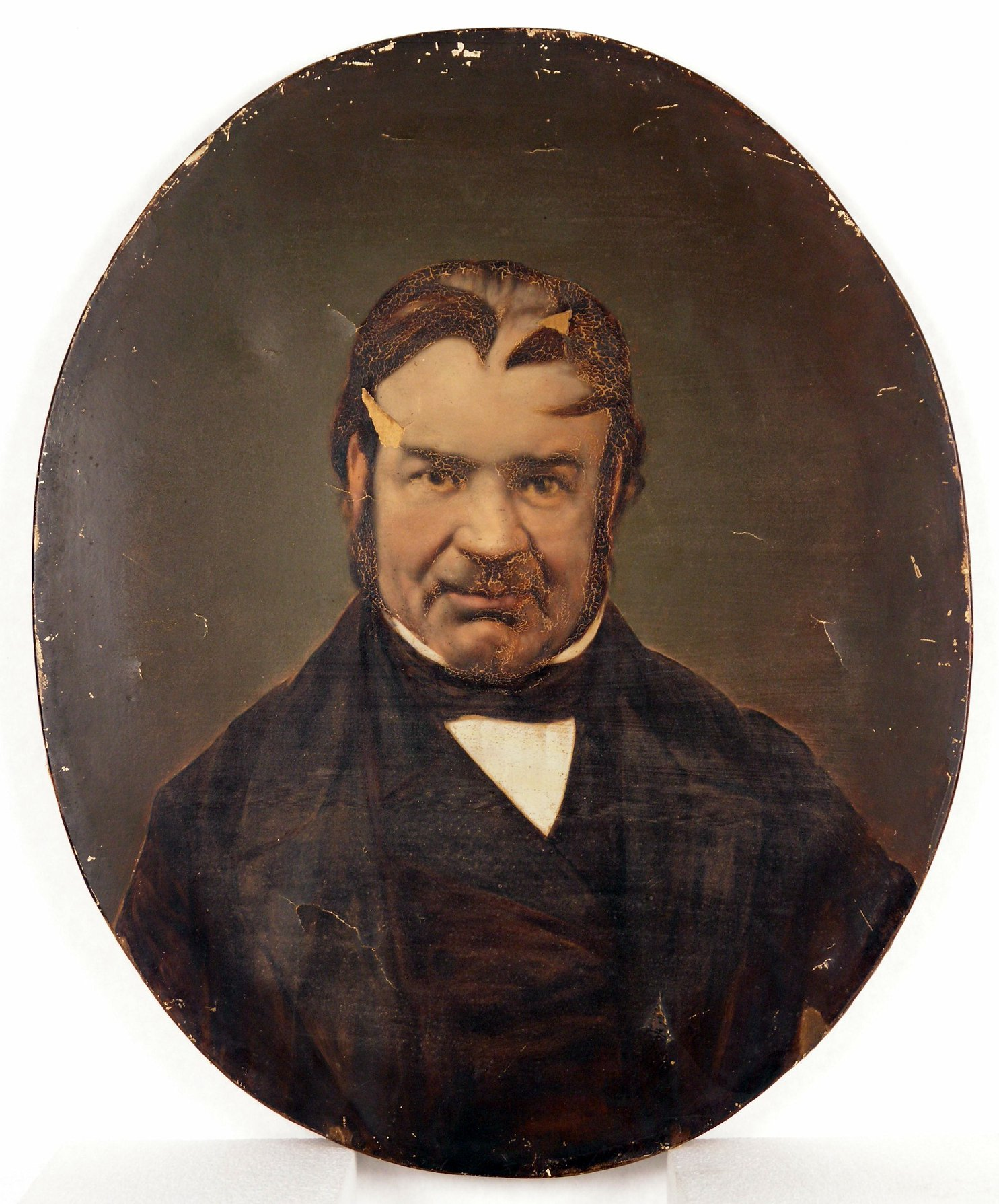
Don Antonio Suñol, longtime owner of Rancho Los Coches and the Roberto Adobe and Suñol House.

Rancho Los Coches was a 2,219-acre (8.98 km^{2}) Mexican land grant in present-day Santa Clara County, California given in 1844 by Governor Manuel Micheltorena to Roberto Balemino, an Indian. The name means Ranch of the Pigs. The grant was located on the west bank of Los Gatos Creek, south of San Jose, near the present-day Burbank. The historic Roberto Adobe & Suñol House is located within the former rancho.

== History ==
Roberto Balemino held a responsible position at Mission Santa Clara. In 1844 he was granted the half square league Rancho Los Coches and was issued a "Certificate of Emancipation", giving him full citizenship. Antonio Suñol obtained the Rancho Los Coches in 1847 from Roberto as payment on a debt.

Antonio Suñol (1796-1865), born in Spain, was a seaman on a French merchant ship and arrived in the Pueblo of San José in 1818. He married María Dolores Bernal and held several public offices including Postmaster (1826-1829), and Alcalde (mayor) in 1841. He was a grantee of Rancho Valle de San Jose with his three brothers-in-law. Sunol, California is named for him. In 1849, Suñol divided Los Coches into thirds; one-third went to his eldest daughter, Paula and her husband Pierre Sainsevain, grantee of Rancho Cañada del Rincon en el Rio San Lorenzo, and one-third was sold to Henry Morris Naglee.

With the cession of California to the United States following the Mexican-American War, the 1848 Treaty of Guadalupe Hidalgo provided that the land grants would be honored. As required by the Land Act of 1851, a claim for Rancho Los Coches was filed with the Public Land Commission in 1852, and the grant was patented to Antonio Suñol, Paula Sainsevain, and Henry Morris Naglee in 1857.

== Historic sites of the Rancho ==
- Roberto-Suñol Adobe.
