= California Historical Landmarks in Santa Clara County =

The following properties and districts in Santa Clara County, California, are listed as California Historical Landmarks.

== Listings ==
Image		Landmark name	Location	City or town	Summary
Almaden Vineyards	505	Almaden Vineyards	1530 Blossom Hill Rd. 37°14′21″N 121°53′41″W	San Jose	
Arroyo de San José Cupertino	800	Arroyo de San José Cupertino	Monta Vista High School; 37°18′56″N 122°03′28″W	Cupertino	
Cathedral Basilica of St. Joseph	910	Cathedral Basilica of St. Joseph	90 S Market St. 37°20′03″N 121°53′27″W	San Jose	Also on the NRHP list as NPS-77000365, St. Joseph's Roman Catholic Church
Charles Copeland Morse House	904	Charles Copeland Morse House	981 Fremont St. 37°21′07″N 121°56′44″W	Santa Clara	Also on the NRHP list as NPS-82002266
Eadweard Muybridge and the development of motion pictures	834	Eadweard Muybridge and the development of motion pictures	Stanford University, Campus Dr W across from Stanford Driving Range; 37°25′29″N 122°10′57″W	Stanford	
Home of Edwin Markham	416	Home of Edwin Markham	Kelley Park, 1600 Senter Rd. 37°19′13″N 121°51′33″W	San Jose	
First successful introduction of the honeybee to California	945	First successful introduction of the honeybee to California	San Jose Municipal Airport, 1661 Airport Blvd. 37°21′N 121°55′W	San Jose	
First Unitarian Church of San Jose	902	First Unitarian Church of San Jose	160 N. Third St. 37°20′23″N 121°53′24″W	San Jose	Also on the NRHP list as NPS-77000343
Forbes Mill	458	Forbes Mill	Forbes Mill Museum; 37°13′20″N 121°58′49″W	Los Gatos	
First site of El Pueblo de San José de Guadalupe	433	First site of El Pueblo de San José de Guadalupe	Former San Jose City Hall at Civic Center; 37°21′00″N 121°54′13″W	San Jose	
Upload Photo	1017	Gilroy Yamato Hot Springs	37°06′30″N 121°28′39″W	Gilroy	Also on the NRHP list as NPS-95000996
Guadalupe Mission of San Jose	1049	Guadalupe Mission of San Jose	2020 E San Antonio St. 37°21′09″N 121°50′41″W	San Jose	Also on the NRHP list as NPS-100000836
Gubserville	447	Gubserville	1481 Saratoga Ave. 37°17′44″N 121°59′16″W	San Jose	
Hayes Mansion	888	Hayes Mansion	200 Edenvale Ave. 37°15′44″N 121°49′15″W	San Jose	
HP Garage	976	HP Garage	367 Addison Ave. 37°26′35″N 122°09′17″W	Palo Alto	Also on the NRHP list as NPS-07000307
Hostess House	895	Hostess House	27 Mitchell Ln. 37°26′35″N 122°09′56″W	Palo Alto	Also on the NRHP list as NPS-76000528
John Adams Squire House	857	John Adams Squire House	900 University Ave. 37°27′12″N 122°09′12″W	Palo Alto	Also on the NRHP list as NPS-72000255
Juana Briones de Miranda Home	524	Juana Briones de Miranda Home	4157 Old Adobe Rd. 37°23′32″N 122°08′22″W	Palo Alto	
Kotani-en	903	Kotani-en	15891 Ravine Rd, Los Gatos; 37°14′13″N 122°00′41″W	Los Gatos	
Lou Henry Hoover House	913	Lou Henry Hoover House	623 Mirada Rd. 37°25′07″N 122°10′03″W	Stanford	
Martin Murphy Home and Estate	644	Martin Murphy Home and Estate	Martin Murphy, Jr. Historical Park; 37°22′56″N 122°01′34″W	Sunnyvale	
Sarah Wallis Mayfield Farm	969	Sarah Wallis Mayfield Farm	3880 La Selva Drive; 37°24′59″N 122°07′49″W	Palo Alto	Historic marker
Mission Santa Clara de Asis	338	Mission Santa Clara de Asis	Mission Church, University of Santa Clara; 37°20′57″N 121°56′30″W	Santa Clara	
Montgomery Hill	813	Montgomery Hill	Corner of San Felipe Road and Yerba Buena Road; 37°17′57″N 121°46′16″W	San Jose	
Moreland School	489	Moreland School	4335 Payne Ave. 37°18′03″N 121°58′45″W	San Jose	
New Almaden Mine	339	New Almaden Mine	On N-bound old Hwy 101; 37°14′54″N 121°47′20″W	San Jose	
Upload Photo	339-1	New Almaden Mine	Bulmore Park, Almaden Rd and Almaden Way; 37°10′27″N 121°49′28″W	San Jose	
Old Post Office	854	Old Post Office	110 S. Market St. 37°20′01″N 121°53′25″W	San Jose	
Old site of Mission Santa Clara de Asis and Old Spanish Bridge	250	Old site of Mission Santa Clara de Asis and Old Spanish Bridge	De La Cruz Blvd. and Martin Ave. 37°21′59″N 121°56′29″W	Santa Clara	
Patchen	448	Patchen	Old Santa Cruz Hwy and Mountain Charlie Rd. 37°08′53″N 121°58′27″W	Holy City	
Paul Masson Mountain Winery	733	Paul Masson Mountain Winery	Mountain Winery; 37°15′37″N 122°03′54″W	Saratoga	Also on the NRHP list as NPS-83001239
Pellier Park, site of City Gardens	434	Pellier Park, site of City Gardens	100 block of W St James St. 37°20′16″N 121°53′45″W	San Jose	
Peralta Adobe	866	Peralta Adobe	900 University Ave. 37°20′11″N 121°53′41″W	San Jose	Also on the NRHP list as NPS-73000454
Pioneer Electronics Research Laboratory	836	Pioneer Electronics Research Laboratory	SE corner of Channing Ave. and Emerson St. 37°26′29″N 122°09′28″W	Palo Alto	
Roberto Adobe and Suñol House	898	Roberto Adobe and Suñol House	770 Lincoln Ave. 37°18′57″N 121°54′23″W	San Jose	
San Jose State College	417	San Jose State College	San Jose State University; 37°20′08″N 121°52′52″W	San Jose	
Santa Clara Campaign Treaty Site	260	Santa Clara Campaign Treaty Site	Civic Center Park; 37°21′08″N 121°57′13″W	Santa Clara	
Saratoga	435	Saratoga	Hwys 9 and 85; 37°15′33″N 122°01′51″W	Saratoga	
Site of California's First State Capitol	461	Site of California's First State Capitol	City Park Plaza; 37°19′58″N 121°53′23″W	San Jose	
Site of invention of the first commercially practicable integrated circuit	1000	Site of invention of the first commercially practicable integrated circuit	844 E Charleston Rd. 37°25′18″N 122°06′12″W	Palo Alto	
Upload Photo	952	Site of the world's first broadcasting station	First and San Fernando Sts. 37°20′03″N 121°53′22″W	San Jose	
Vasquez Tree and site of 21-Mile-House	259	Vasquez Tree and site of 21-Mile-House	Tennant Ave. and Monterey Hwy. 37°06′47″N 121°38′38″W	Morgan Hill	
Winchester Mystery House	868	Winchester Mystery House	525 S. Winchester Blvd. 37°19′06″N 121°57′03″W	San Jose	Also on the NRHP list as NPS-74000559
Women's Club Adobe	249	Women's Club Adobe	3260 The Alameda between Benton and Franklin Sts. 37°21′07″N 121°56′27″W	Santa Clara	

== See also ==
- List of California Historical Landmarks
- National Register of Historic Places listings in Santa Clara County, California
