= Santa Clara Women's Club Adobe =

Historic site in Santa Clara County, California, United States

Santa Clara Women’s Club Adobe
- Women's Club Adobe
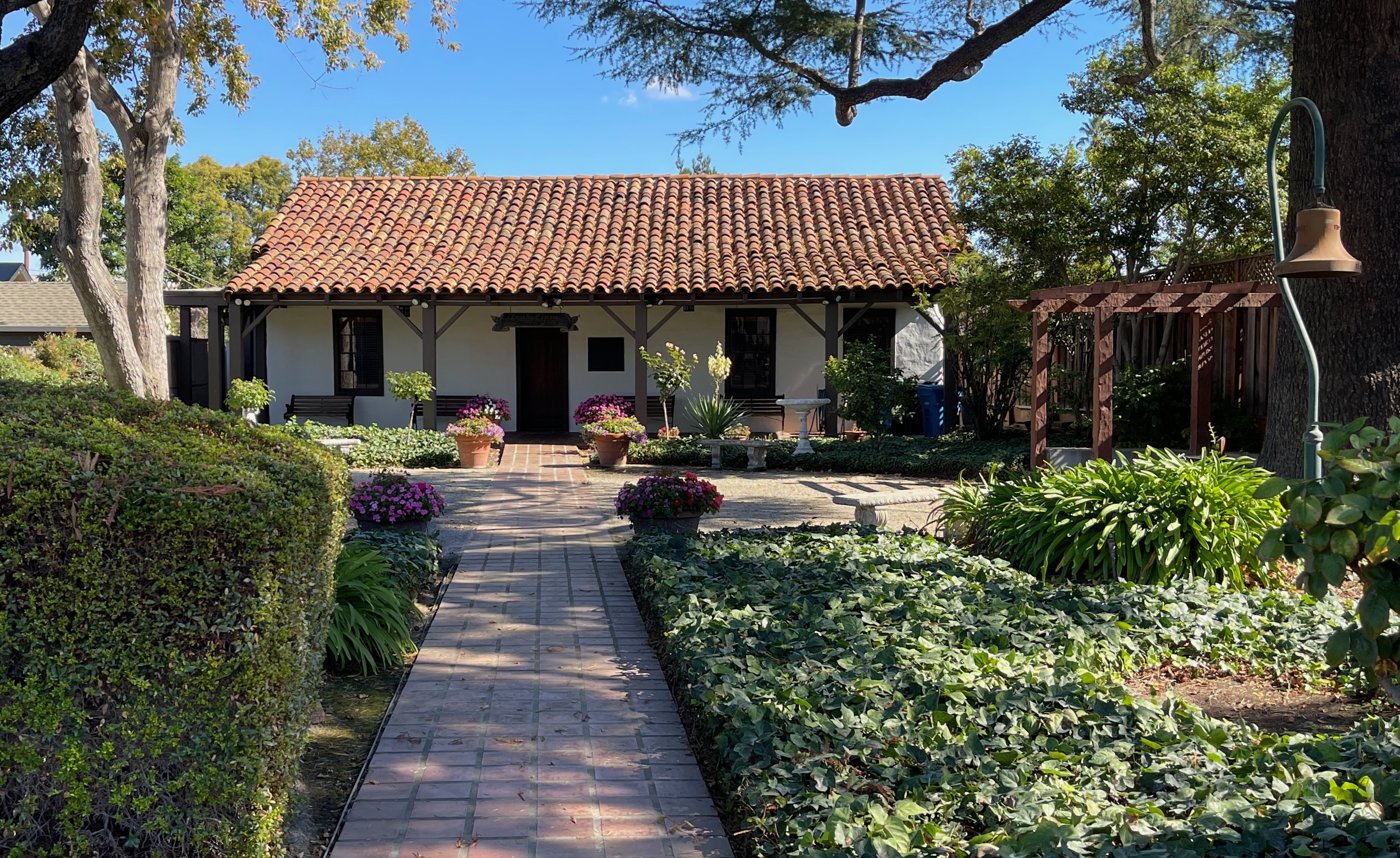
- Santa Clara Women's Club Adobe

- Location in Santa Clara County
- 37°21′7″N 121°56′27″W
- Type: Adobe
- Location: 3260 The Alameda, Santa Clara, California, US

History
- Founder: Mission Santa Clara de Asís
- Built: 1880
- Built for: Native Americans
- Original use: Home

California Historical Landmark
- Official name: Santa Clara Women’s Club Adobe
- Designated: January 20, 1961
- Reference no.: 249

The Santa Clara Women's Club Adobe, also known as the Santa Clara Woman's Club, is a historic adobe structure in Santa Clara, California, dating back to 1880. Its construction can be attributed to the efforts of Franciscan padres from Mission Santa Clara de Asís. This adobe house, one of the oldest in the Santa Clara Valley, was part of a series of homes built between 1792 and 1800 to provide housing for Native American families associated with Mission Santa Clara. In 1913, the Santa Clara Woman's Club purchased the adobe structure. California Historical Landmark plaque #249 now marks the location of the Santa Clara Women's Club Adobe.

== History ==
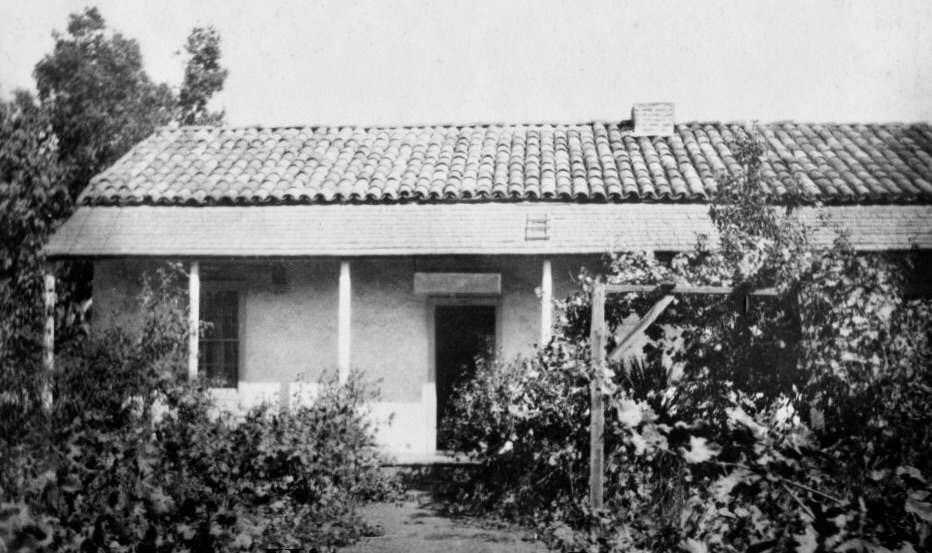
The Santa Clara Women's Club in 1914.

The adobe house is the sole surviving original structure from the Spanish missions era (formerly the region Alta California in the Spanish Empire), dating back to 1800, which was once an integral component of the third mission site. This compound consisted of a five parallel rows of 30 homes constructed to house Native American families associated with Mission Santa Clara. In its present-day role, this adobe structure is known as the Santa Clara Women's Club Adobe, as it has functioned as their clubhouse since 1907. Don José Peña was the proprietor of the adobe house in 1850, and his wife resided here until her death in 1883.

Each of these dwellings, constructed from adobe bricks and tile roofs, featured two rooms and an attic. These residences formed part of the larger Mission Santa Clara Ranchería (rural settlements), extending westward from the Murguía Church. Because of secularization in the 1830s, grants of mission land became prevalent. In 1840, Governor Juan Bautista Alvarado awarded Don José Peña a 100-vara land grant, along with one of those houses in the Rancheria de Santa Clara, in lieu of unpaid salary. Peña was a lieutenant who spent his final years in Santa Clara. It appears that this house included four of the adobe structures, given that his will characterizes the house as having a total of eight rooms. Following Jose Pena's death in 1852, his widow Gertrudis and his daughter-in-law Concepción, who was also a widow, found their property in high demand due to the increasing number of Americans settling in the region. In response, they began selling portions of their 300-foot-square block of land, retaining ownership of the area directly surrounding the adobe house. Subsequently, Concepción leased a section of the adobe home, taking up residence in the two northernmost rooms. Upon Concepción's passing in March 1883, she bequeathed her entire estate, including the adobe house to her sister Magdalena's brother. In 1902, when Magdalena died, her sole surviving family member, her brother-in-law Thomas, inherited the adobe structure. He made it his residence and lived there until his demise in 1911.

In September 1913, as part of Thomas's estate, the Santa Clara Woman's Club purchased the adobe structure along with the adjacent 60 ft (18 m) by 147 ft (45 m) parcel for $350 (equivalent to $11,402 in 2025). Following the acquisition, the Woman's Club embarked on a renovation effort, investing $400 in the remodeling of the adobe house. Their enhancements included laying a wooden floor over the original earthen one, repairing the tile roof, and removing a small dormer in the roof. On June 24, 1914, in a civic ceremony, the adobe structure was officially opened as the Woman's Club clubhouse. In 1958, further improvements were made, such as the addition of a carved wooden door and a Spanish tile floor. A modern extension was also built at the rear of the home, which featured a meeting room, kitchen, and restroom facilities. These efforts helped transform the structure into a more functional space for the Woman's Club and the community it served.

== Landmark status ==
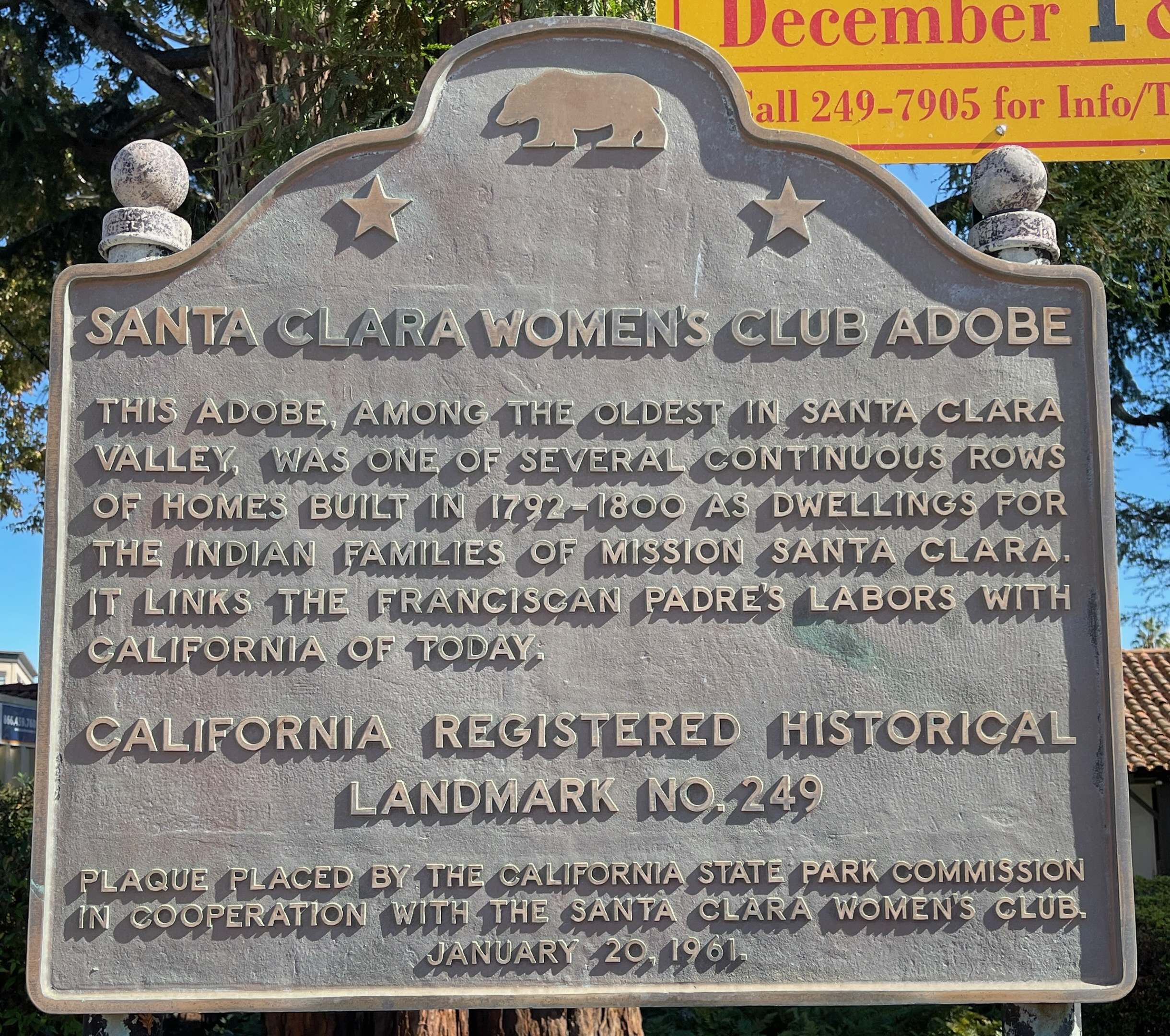
Santa Clara Women's Club Adobe Plague

The registration for the Women's Club Adobe Plaque as a California Historical Landmark #249 dates back to September 3, 1937. On January 20, 1961, the California State Parks Commission in cooperation with the Santa Clara Women's Club, erected a commemorative plaque, that designates the site of the Women's Club Adobe. The marker is located at 3260 The Alameda between Benton and Franklin Streets, Santa Clara, California. The inscription on the plaque reads: "This adobe, among the oldest in Santa Clara Valley, was one of several continuous rows of homes built in 1792–1800 as dwellings for the indian families of Mission Santa Clara. It links the Franciscan padres’ labors with California of today."

An El Camino Real commemorative bell marker is located on sidewalk in front of the adobe structure, and there is also a replica of one in the garden. El Camino Real is a commemorative route spanning approximately 600 miles (970 km) in length, connecting 21 Spanish missions in California, along with a number of sub-missions, four presidios, and three pueblos. A wooden marker at the front garden wall, designates the historic home as a part of the Ranchería Mission.

== See also ==
- California Historical Landmarks in Santa Clara County
- Spanish missions in California
- List of women's clubs
