= Santa Clara Campaign Treaty Site =

Historic site in Santa Clara County, California, United States

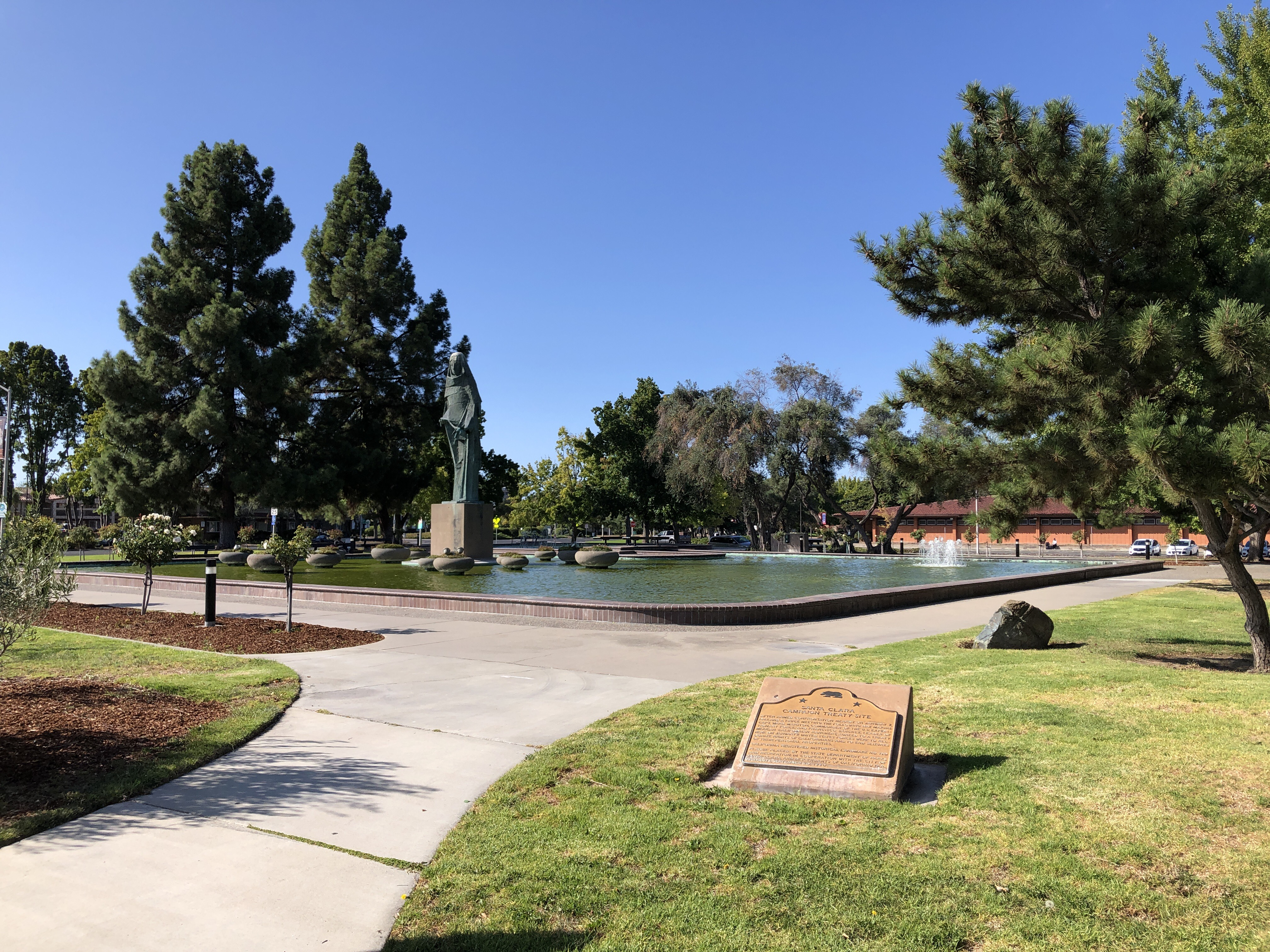
- Santa Clara Campaign Treaty Site Civic Center

- Location in Santa Clara County
- 37°21′8″N 121°57′13″W
- Location: Lincoln St, Santa Clara, California, US

History
- Built: September 20, 1980

California Historical Landmark
- Official name: Santa Clara Campaign Treaty Site
- Designated: September 20, 1980
- Reference no.: 260

The Santa Clara Campaign Treaty Site stands as a historic landmark that commemorates the Battle of Santa Clara, an armed clash that transpired during the Mexican-American War, fought on January 2, 1847. It was followed by a truce meeting the subsequent day. During this meeting, Marine Captain Ward Marston, commanding the United States expeditionary force, and Francisco Sánchez, the leader of the Mexican-Californian ranchers, came to an agreement on January 7, 1847. Under the terms of the treaty, U.S. forces committed to respecting the rights of Californians and discontinuing the seizure of their property. The plaque bearing California Historical Landmark #260 is located on Lincoln Street in Santa Clara, California. This plaque serves to commemorate the Santa Clara Campaign Treaty site.

== History ==
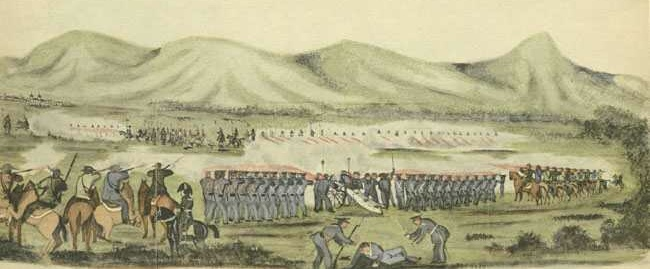
Battle of Santa Clara, California (1847).

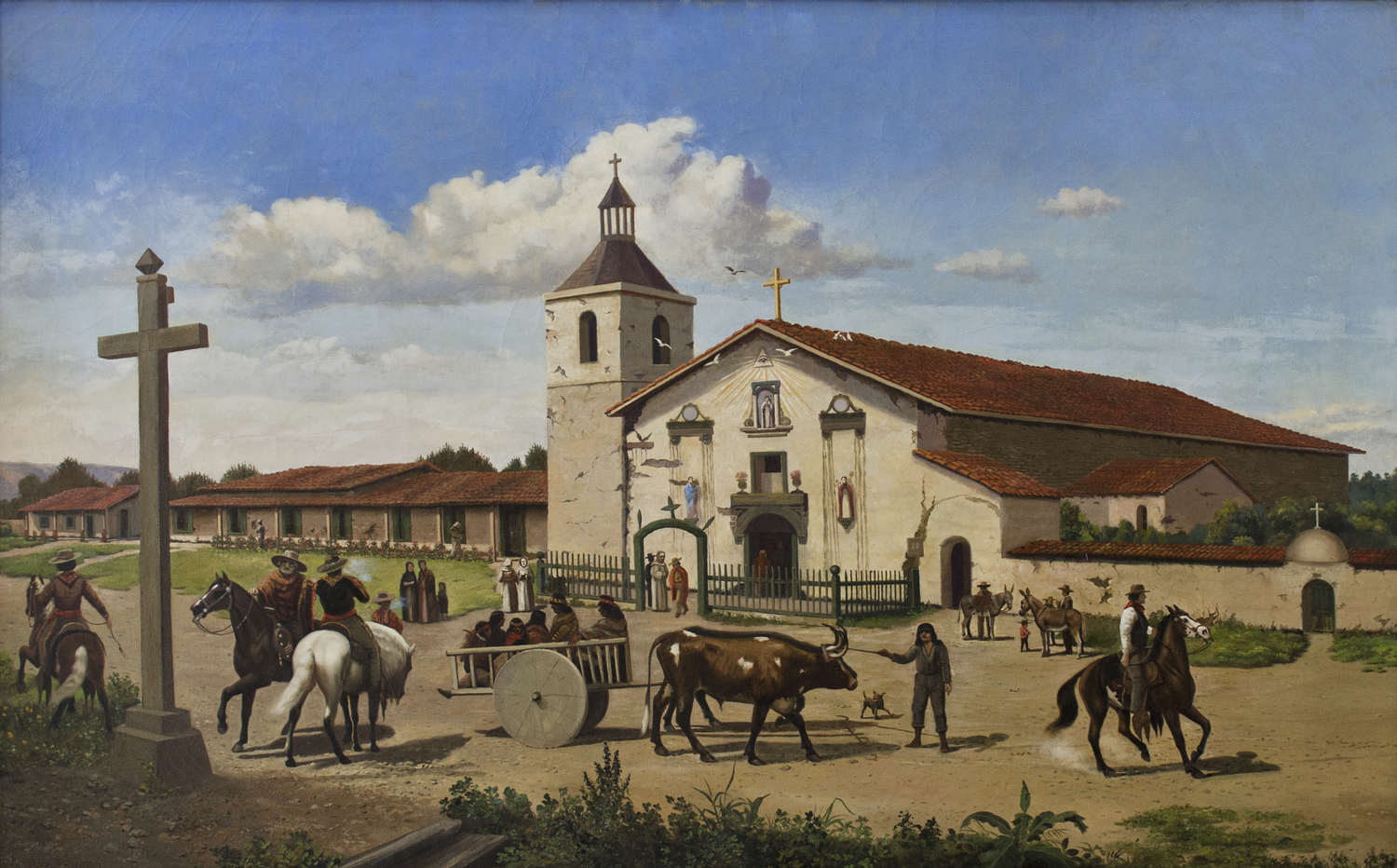
Mission Santa Clara de Asís (1849.)

On January 2, 1847, a military encounter took place between Californios and a contingent of United States soldiers, sailors, and marines in Santa Clara, California. Santa Clara, a small mission settlement in Northern California, situated to the south of San Francisco, had transitioned from Spanish to Mexican control in 1821 with minimal alteration. Starting in 1836, the Mexican government began granting land to influential individuals, who went on to establish expansive cattle ranches known as rancheros. During the 1840s, American settlers began to arrive in the region in increasing numbers. In the lead-up to the Mexican-American War, California experienced a period of turmoil characterized by revolutions and counter-revolutions that challenged Mexican administration. In 1845, Governor Manuel Micheltorena was ousted from office and replaced by Pío Pico, who subsequently relocated the state's administrative headquarters from Monterey to Los Angeles.

The U.S. contingent dispatched to address the tensions in Santa Clara comprised a mere 101 individuals. This group included 35 U.S. Marines, 15 U.S. Navy personnel, and the remaining members were American volunteers. The command of this force was entrusted to Marine officer Captain Ward Matson, following orders issued on December 28, 1846. These orders directed him to disperse any hostile forces in the region. The march from San Francisco was further complicated by challenging conditions, with heavy rainfall and cold weather adding to the difficulties. During the initial days, there was no organized opposition encountered. On December 31, a scouting party made a significant discovery, locating a contingent of Californios within a five-mile radius of Marston's position.

U.S. forces pressed on, and on January 2, 1847, they met the Californios near Mission Santa Clara de Asís. Captain Marston issued orders for his two volunteer companies, one hailing from San Jose and the other from Yerba Buena, to safeguard the left and right flanks. He assigned the U.S. Navy contingent to operate the expedition's cannon, while instructing the marines to advance. The Californios who opposed them numbered roughly the same, but they lacked artillery. Moreover, being primarily farmers and ranchers, they were not well-organized or led. Sporadic musket fire was followed by several shots from the U.S. sailors' cannon. U.S. forces continued their advance until they reached the Santa Clara mission, at which point the Californios dispersed. Californio casualties amounted to four killed and five wounded, while Marston reported only two casualties, both of them wounded.

On the following day, January 3, 1847, a group of Californios sought permission to converse with Captain Matson. They conveyed their stance, emphasizing that they harbored no hostility toward the United States and had no allegiance to Mexico. Their armed actions were solely aimed at safeguarding their homes and property from further seizures. They went on to present specific instances of property confiscation and theft. Captain Marston relayed their grievances to his superiors, and on January 7, 1847, an agreement was reached between the two parties. According to the terms of this agreement, the Californios agreed to surrender any hostages they held and relinquish any cannons in their possession. In return, the Americans pledged to respect Californio property, compensate them for previous losses, and return any confiscated cattle or horses. The agreement also included amnesty for all rebels who had participated in the uprising. This accord effectively marked the conclusion of hostilities in Northern California.

== Landmark status ==
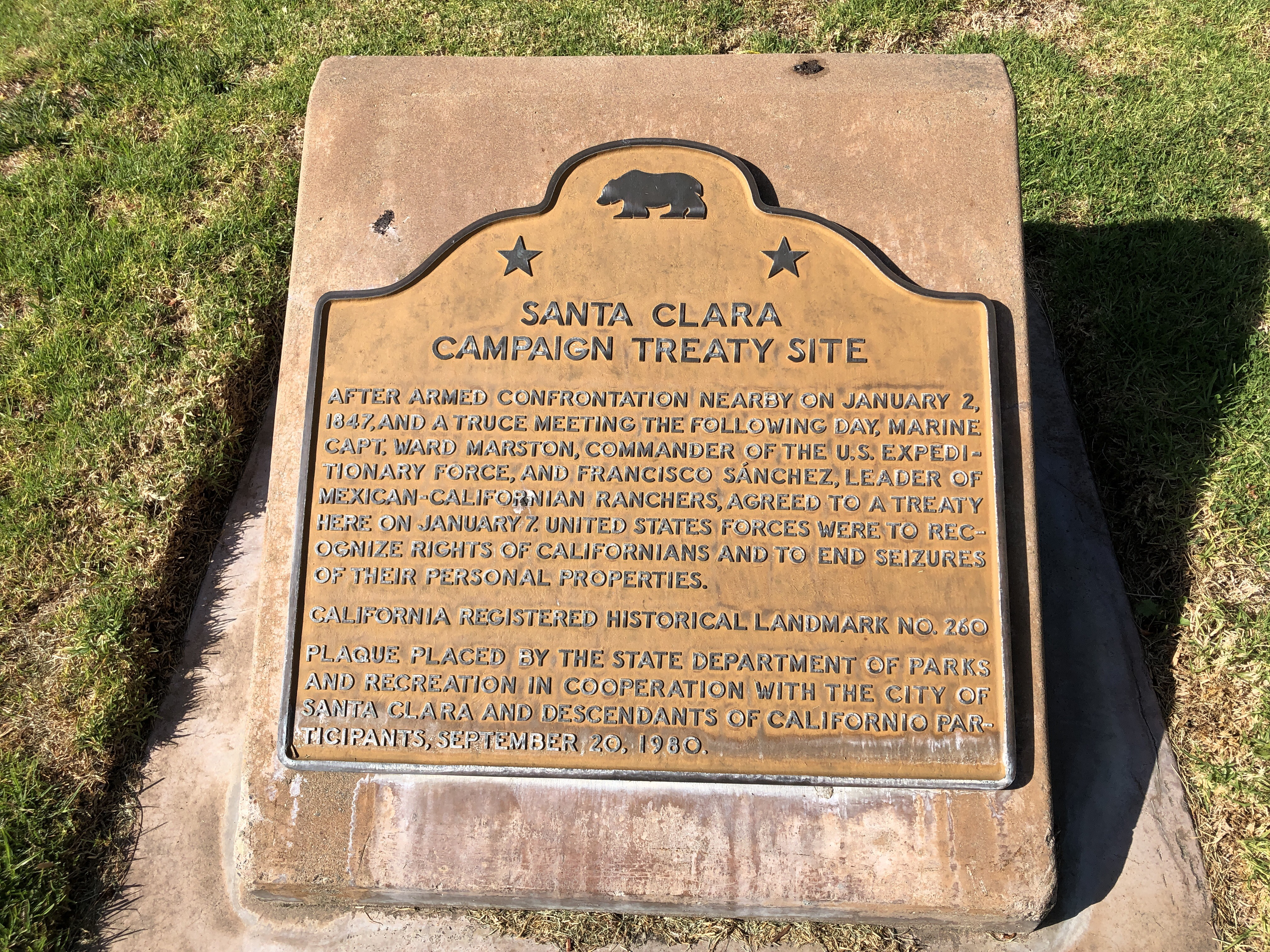
California historical landmark plaque.

The registration for the Santa Clara Campaign Treaty Site Plaque as a California Historical Landmark #260 dates back to September 3, 1937. On September 20, 1980, the State Department of Parks and Recreation in cooperation with the city of Santa Clara and descendants of Californio Participants, erected a commemorative plaque, that designates the site of the Santa Clara Campaign Treaty. The marker is located at the Santa Clara Civic Center at Lincoln Street, Santa Clara, California. The inscription on the plaque reads:

After an armed confrontation on January 2 and a meeting the following day, Marine Captain Ward Marston, commander of the United States expeditionary force, and Francisco Sánchez, leader of the Mexican-Californian ranchers, agreed to a treaty here on January 7, 1847. U.S. forces were to recognize the rights of the Californians and end seizures of their property.

There is also an "Armistice Oak Tree Site" historical landmark that marks the site where Francisco Sánchez surrendered himself and some American prisoners ending the Battle of Santa Clara on January 8, 1847. The marker is at El Camino Real near Lawrence Expressway.

== See also ==
- California Historical Landmarks in Santa Clara County
- Battles of the Mexican–American War
