= Moreland School =

School district in Santa Clara County, California

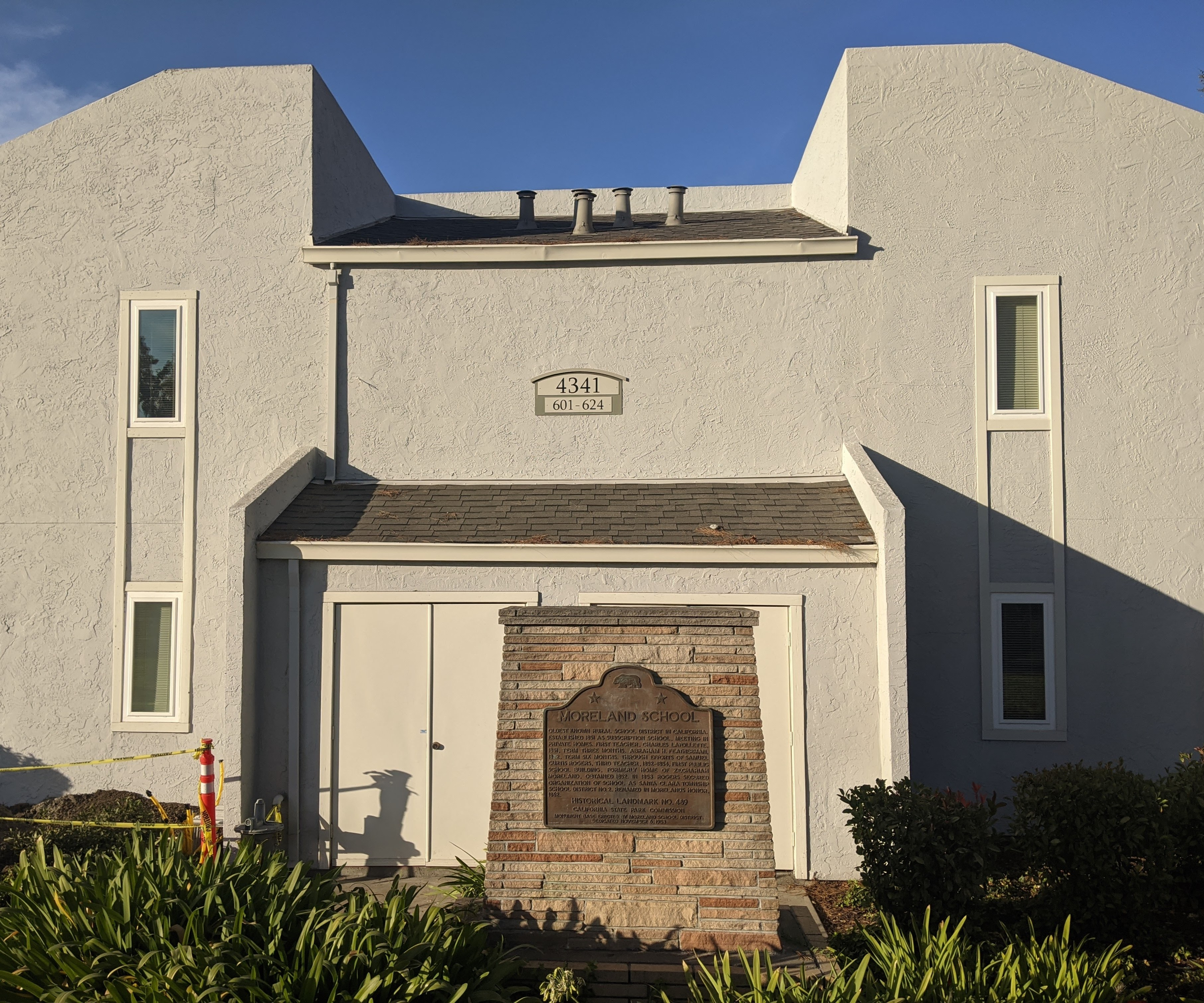
- Moreland School commemorative plaque

- Location in San Jose, California
- 37°18′3.8″N 121°58′47″W
- Location: 4341 Payne Ave, San Jose, California, US

History
- Built: 1851
- Built for: Zechariah Moreland
- Original use: School district
- Demolished: 1951
- Rebuilt: 1894, 1948

Site notes
- Current use: Moreland Apartments

California Historical Landmark
- Official name: Moreland School
- Designated: August 7, 1951
- Reference no.: 489

The Moreland School is a historic landmark in San Jose, Santa Clara County, California, United States, as California's first rural school district in the state in 1851.

The first public school building was the former residence of Zechariah Moreland. It was acquired for use as a school on November 13, 1852, through the efforts of the school's third teacher, Samuel Curtis Rogers. The building stood at the intersection of Payne and Saratoga Avenues.

In 1951, the old Moreland School building was dismantled from its original location, making way for the Moreland Apartments. On November 6, 1953, the California State Park Commission, erected a commemorative plaque that designates this site as California Historical Landmark #489, the oldest known rural school district in California. The historical marker is located on Payne Avenue, approximately 100 yards east of Saratoga Avenue.

== History ==
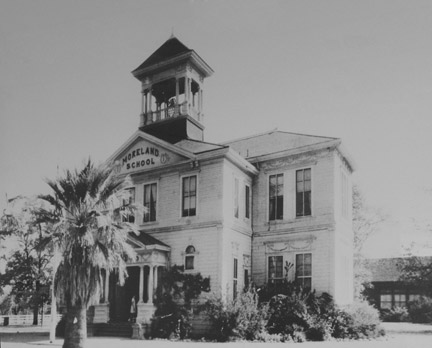
Moreland school ca. 1895

The Moreland School was established in 1851, as California's first rural school district. Initially, students received their education in private residences, under the guidance of the district's first educator, Charles La Follette and second teacher Abraham H. Featherman. The first public school building was the former residence of Zechariah Moreland. It was acquired for use as a school on November 13, 1852, through the efforts of the school's third teacher, Samuel Curtis Rogers for $350 (equivalent to $13,545 in 2025). Rogers taught from 1852 to 1854. In 1853, the district integrated into California's public school system and was designated as the "Santa Clara Township School District No. 2." Later in 1862, the school underwent a name change to become the Moreland School, in honor of its benefactor, Zechariah Moreland. The dwelling stood at the intersection of Payne and Saratoga Avenues, situated northeast of the venerable oak tree, officially christened "The Moreland Oak Tree" in August 1981.

Gubserville was an early-day settlement that served as a way station with its very own United States post office located approximately half a mile from Moreland school toward Saratoga.

The school continued to serve as the district's first schoolhouse until 1894 when a new Moreland Elementary School was constructed at the same spot, on the land contributed by Zechariah Moreland. This new school served as the sole educational institution for the district from 1894 until 1948. The facility had been designed to accommodate the eventual expansion of the Moreland School District. Initially, only the ground floor was utilized, with the upper level occasionally hosting dances until it was repurposed as classroom space. The Moreland School functioned as a hub of learning within the district until 1949, at which point the combined factors of classroom sizes and structural aging necessitated its closure.

In 1948, a modern Moreland School was erected, leading to the demolition of the original building in 1951. The new Moreland School housed students from 1948 to 1975. Moreland School remained in uninterrupted operation at the original site of Zechariah Moreland's property for 123 years, spanning from 1852 to 1975.

== Landmark status ==
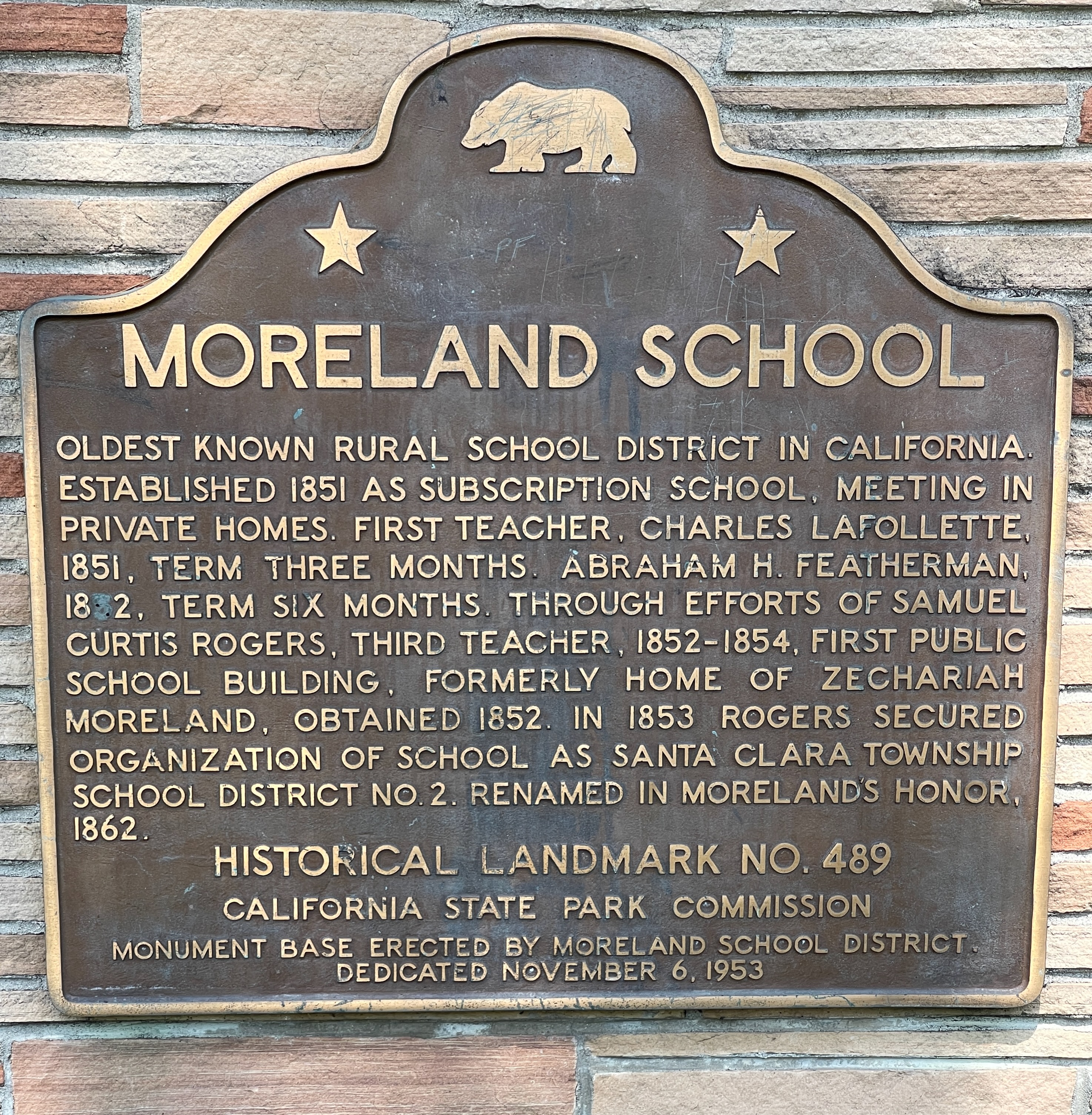
Moreland school plaque and California State Historical Landmark #489

In 1951, the old Moreland School District building was dismantled from its original location, making way for the Moreland Apartment Complex, which now serves as a senior housing center. On November 6, 1953, the California State Park Commission, erected a commemorative plaque that designates this site as California Historical Landmark #489, the oldest known rural school district in California. The monument base was erected by the Moreland School District. The historical marker is located on Payne Avenue, approximately 100 yards east of Saratoga Avenue. Just twenty yards away stood the Moreland Oak, a testament to the founders of Moreland, planted in the late 1800s.

The original school bell, once situated at the building's tower above the old school, has been preserved and is now displayed outside the current Moreland School District Office. Moreland School remained in continuous operation on the original site donated by Zechariah Moreland from 1852 to 1975, spanning 123 years. Today, the Moreland School District is a PreK-8 public school district headquartered in San Jose, Santa Clara County, California, United States.

The inscription on the plaque reads:

Oldest known rural school district in California. Established 1851 as subscription school, meeting in private homes. First teacher, Charles Lafollette, 1851, term three months. Abraham H. Featherman, 1852, term six months. Through efforts of Samuel Curtis Rogers, third teacher, 1852-1854, first public school building, formerly home of Zechariah Moreland, obtained 1852. In 1853 Rogers secured organization of school as Santa Clara Township School District No. 2. Renamed in Moreland's honor, 1862.

== See also ==
- California Historical Landmarks in Santa Clara County
- List of school districts in California
- Wikipedia: WikiProject Schools
