= Pellier Park =

Historic site in Santa Clara County, California, United States

- City Gardens Site
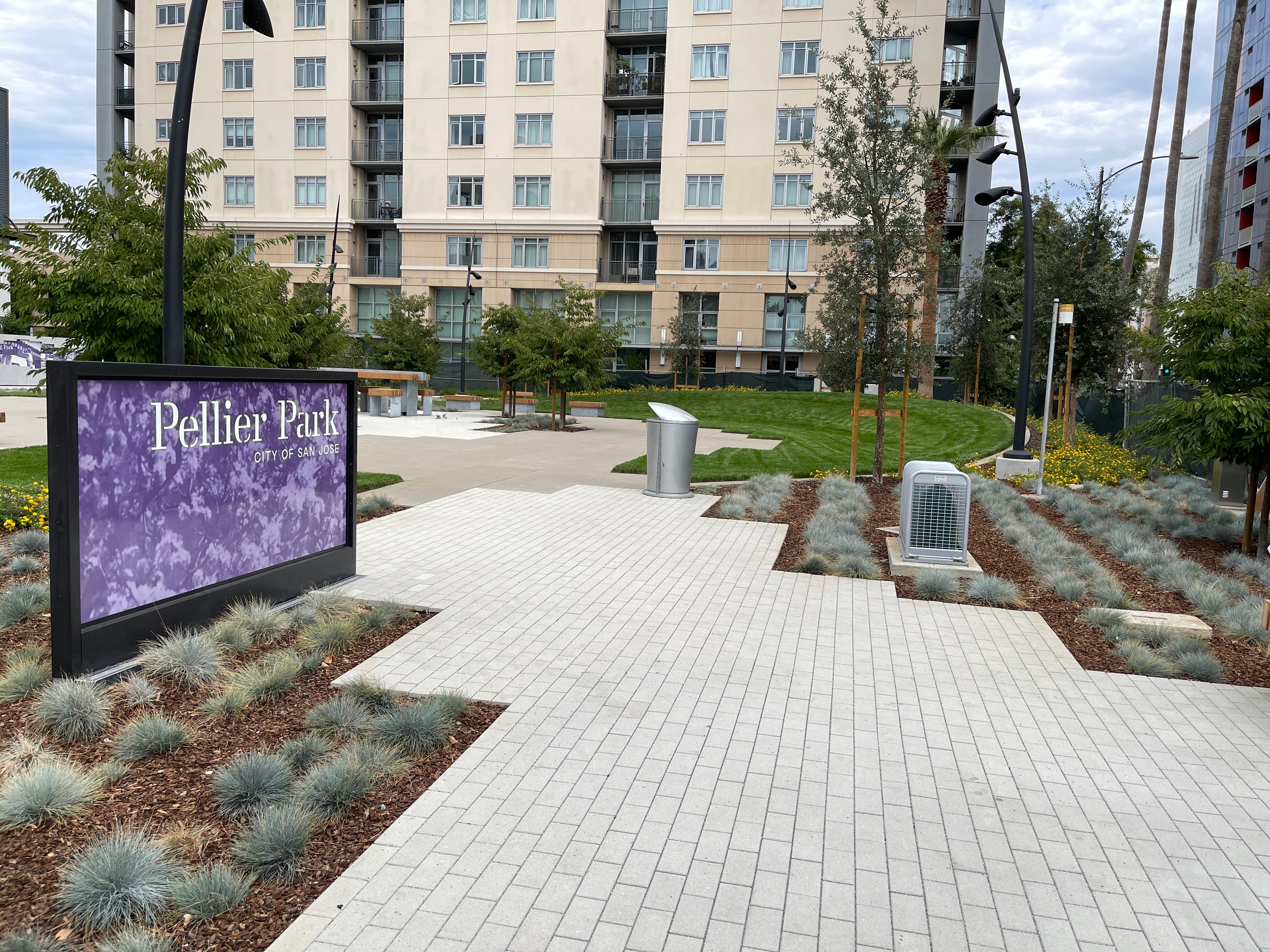
- Pellier Park, site of City Gardens

- Location in Santa Clara County
- 37°22′56″N 122°1′33″W
- Location: 100 West Saint James Street, San Jose, California, US

History
- Founder: Louis Pellier
- Built: 1850
- Original use: Nursery called City Gardens

Site notes
- Area: 0.5 acres (0.20 ha)

California Historical Landmark
- Official name: Pellier Park, site of City Gardens
- Designated: November 29, 1977
- Reference no.: 434

Pellier Park, is a city park covering 0.5 acres (0.20 ha) in San Jose, California, United States, located in close proximity to San Pedro Square. This park holds historical significance as it was once home to City Gardens, a nursery founded by Louis Pellier (1817–1872), who is known as the pioneer of California's prune industry. In October 1850, Pellier established the City Gardens, where with the assistance of his brothers Pierre and Jean, he introduced the French prune, also known as "la petite prune d'Agen," which translates to "the little Agen plum," to California during the winter of 1856. The California Historical Landmark No. 434 now marks the location of the City Gardens site. The park dedicated to California's "Prune King" was officially reopened in a public ceremony on October 18, 2023.

== History ==
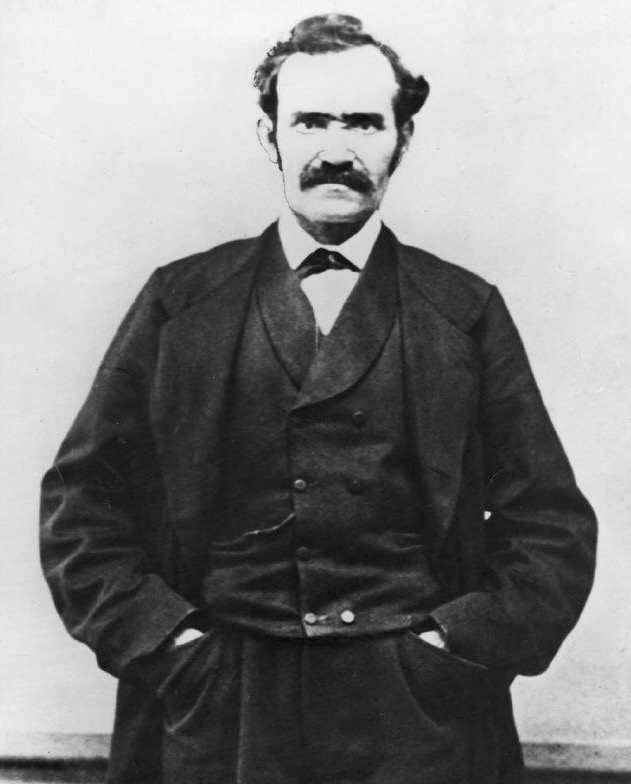
Portrait of Louis Pellier founder of City Gardens.

Louis Pellier (1817–1872) was from Saint-Hippolyte, France. He arrived in San Francisco, California in 1849, during the gold rush. In October 1850, he founded a nursery named City Gardens, with the assistance of his brothers Pierre and Jean, who also immigrated from France. In December 1856, Pierre brought in 500 pounds of French plant materials, including seeds, cuttings, and plants by ship crossing the Isthmus to San Francisco. After boarding a paddle-wheel steamer bound for Alviso, they continued on to San Jose by wagon. Among these imports was a French prune from the Ville Neuve d'Agen, referred to as "la petite prune d'Agen," which translates to "the little Agen plum." Pellier distributed cuttings from his plum trees and instructed fellow farmers on the art of grafting French prune scions onto the root stocks of the wild plum, thus introducing the French prune to California. He became the visionary behind California's prune industry. In subsequent years, the local cultivation of this prune evolved into a multi-million-dollar industry, becoming the primary agricultural crop in Santa Clara County. In 1887, San Jose alone had 52,000 acres (21,000 ha) of prune trees. By 2018, California was responsible for 96 percent of the national prune production and 70 percent of the global prune production.

Leonard McKay, a member of the E Clampus Vitus Mountain Charlie Chapter 1850, and Jim Arbuckle raised money to build the park, which was designated as a public park on May 31, 1977. It was formally dedicated on November 29, 1977, in conjunction with San Jose's 200th birthday celebration. In 2005, the city made the decision to close the park, citing security concerns and downtown development as outlined in the Pellier Park Master Plan.

In July 2021, San Jose city officials conducted a groundbreaking ceremony for Pellier Park as an open space designed to provide downtown residents with a space away from the downtown hustle. The park's construction was projected to have a budget of approximately $2.6 million. The park honoring California's "Prune King" reopened during a public ceremony on October 18, 2023.

== Landmark status ==
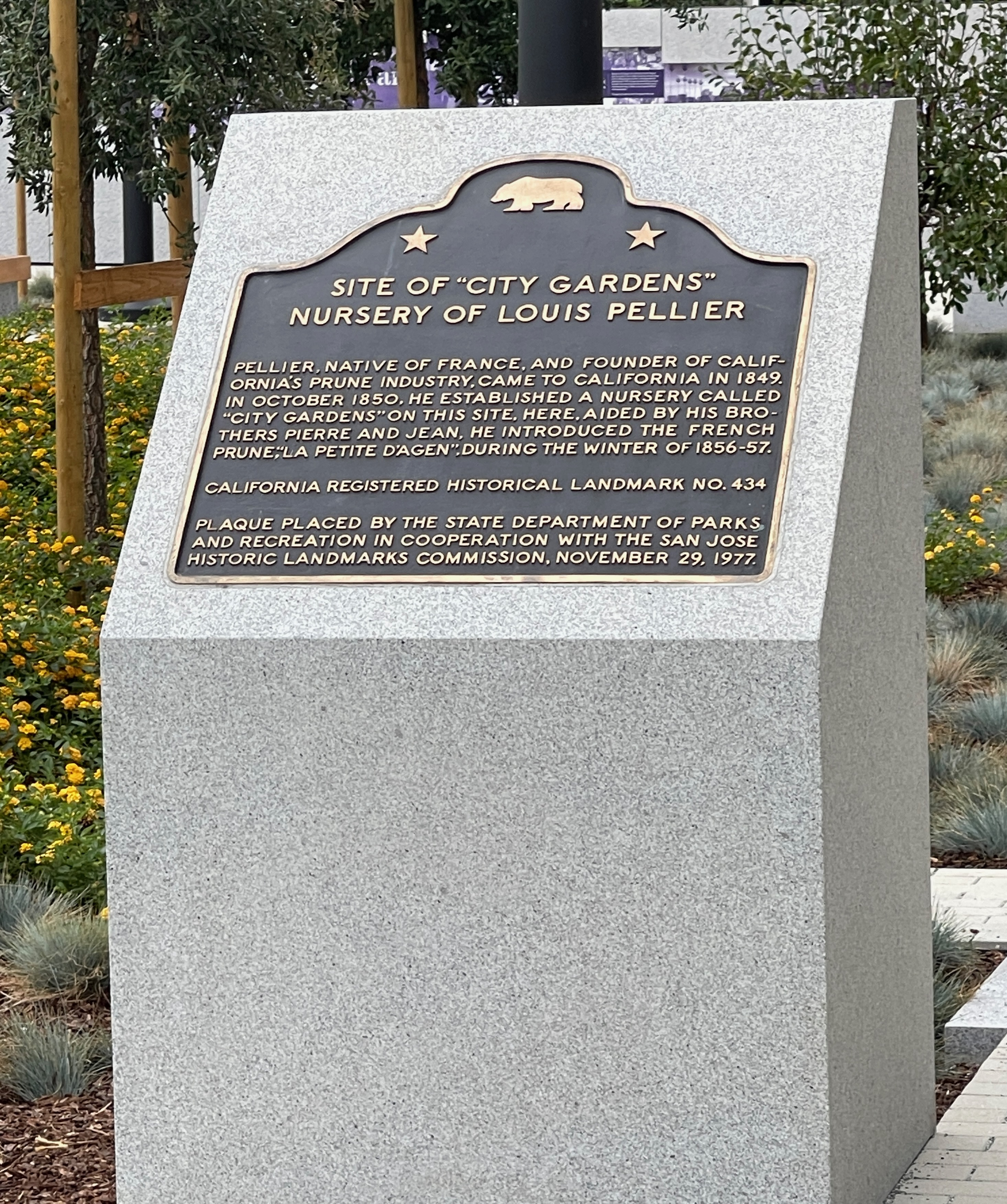
Pellier Park commemorative plaque for site of "City Gardens" nursery.

The registration for the City Gardens Nursery site as a historic resource dates back to March 16, 1949. A commemorative plaque that designates this site as California Historical Landmark No. 434 was placed by the California State Parks in cooperation with the San Jose Historical Landmarks Commission on November 29, 1977. The marker is at the corner of W. Saint James Street and Terraine Street, in downtown San Jose. The inscription on the marker reads:

Site Of "City Gardens" Nursery of Louis Pellier. Pellier, native of France, and founder of California's prune industry, came to California in 1849. In October 1850, he established a nursery called "City Gardens" on this site. Here, aided by his brothers Pierre and Jean, he introduced the French prune, "La Petite D'Agen," during the winter of 1856–57.

== See also ==
- California Historical Landmarks in Santa Clara County
