= Kotani-en =

Historic Japanese residence in California, United States

- U.S. National Register of Historic Places
- California Historical Landmark
- Kotani-En Garden and residence

- Location within San Jose, California
- Location: 15891 Ravine Road, Los Gatos, California, US
- Coordinates: 37°14′14″N 122°0′40″W
- Area: 2 acres (0.81 ha)
- Built: 1918 and 1924
- Built by: Takashima
- Architectural style: Japanese architecture
- Website: kotanien.com
- NRHP reference No.: 76000527
- CHISL No.: 903

Significant dates
- Added to NRHP: March 17, 1977
- Designated CHISL: December 15, 1984

Kotani-en, (/ˈk, tn, in/) also known as the Kotani-En Garden is a classical Japanese residence designed in the formal Japanese architecture-style reminiscent of a 13th-century estate in Los Gatos, in Santa Clara County, California. "Kotani-en" translates to "miniature park" in Japanese. The garden features walls with tile roofs that encircle a tea house, shrine, gardens, and ponds. It was built between 1918 and 1924 for Max M. Cohen, utilizing materials of mahogany, cedar, bamboo, and ceramic tiles. The property is listed in the National Register of Historic Places and is California Historical Landmark #903.

== History ==
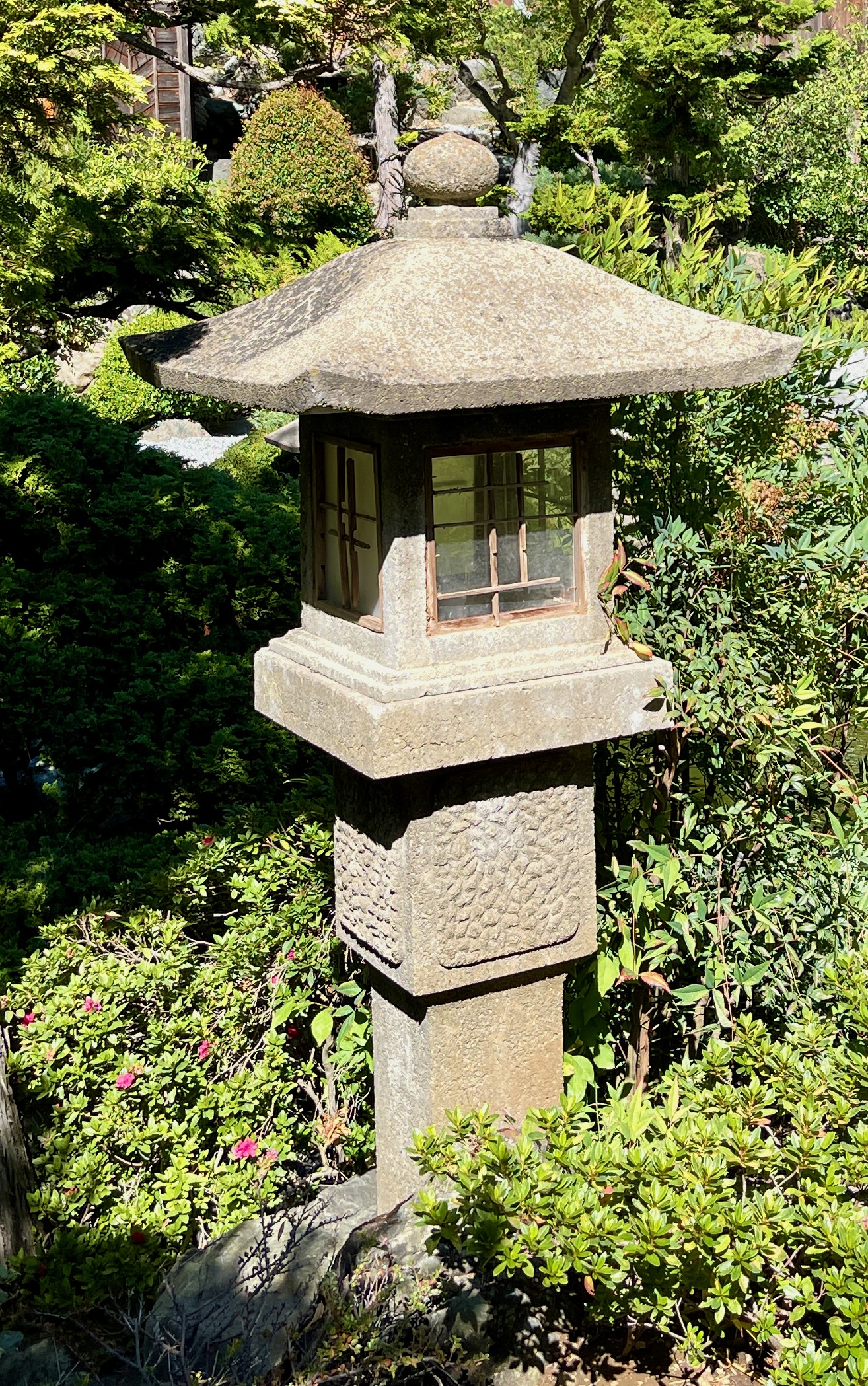
Kotani-en garden lantern

Kotani-en is a Japanese garden estate located in Los Gatos, California. The estate was constructed by architect Takahashi Takashima, along with eleven craftsmen from Japan. It replicates the design of a Samurai residence, reminiscent of a 13th-century estate, complete with tile-roofed walls that enclose a tea house, shrine, landscaped gardens, and a pond with imperial koi. Situated on two acres, Kotani-En is located less than 2 miles from downtown Los Gatos. Since its completion in 1924, the property has remained in private ownership.

Construction of Hakone started around 1918, and took a decade to complete at a cost of more than $250,000. The garden was commissioned by San Francisco industrialist Max M. Cohn in 1918. The creek has been dammed to form a pond with botanical specimens that were originally imported from Japan. The garden features a pond with waterfalls, a 13th-century-style residence, a Buddhist temple, stone lanterns, iron sculptures depicting cranes and turtles, and Torii gates.

Kotani-En was built employing period-appropriate tools. No nails were utilized in the construction, and all structures were assembled using traditional mortise and tenon joinery techniques. The architectural elements are crafted from cryptomeria cedar and mahogany, with bronze lanterns and a glazed ceramic tile roof. The garden's temple, devoted to the deity Ben-ten, is surrounded by a Roji wall fifteen feet high in certain sections.

In 1968, Bill Robson, a consulting engineer, acquired Kotani-en and spent 15 years restoring the garden. The name "Kotani-en" translates to "miniature park" in Japanese. Robson's restoration aimed to recreate Kotani-en as it stood when initially designed by Takashima in 1918, utilizing the original plans made by Takashima on rice paper.

== Landmark status ==
On November 29, 1976, Herbert Rhodes, the director of California State Parks, granted approval for Kotani-en as a California Historical Landmarks in Santa Clara County, describing it as a "prominent example of Japanese landscape architecture in America." On December 15, 1984, the California State Parks, in cooperation with Mountain Charlie Chapter No. 1850, E Clampus Vitus, erected a commemorative plaque, designating the site as California Historical Landmark #903. The landmark plaque is at 15891 Ravine Road, Los Gatos, California. Access to the garden is not available to the public.

The inscription on the plaque reads:

Kotani-En is a classical Japanese residence in the formal style of a 13th-century estate with tile roofed walls surrounding a tea house, shrine, gardens, and ponds. Constructed for Max M. Cohen in 1918-1924 of mahogany, cedar, bamboo, and ceramic tile by master artisan Takashima and eleven craftsmen from Japan, Kotani-En represents a harmonious union of art and nature in a two-acre rustic environment. Kotani-En is a prominent example of Japanese landscape architecture in America."

== See also ==
- California Historical Landmarks in Santa Clara County
- National Register of Historic Places listings in Santa Clara County, California
