= John Adam Squire House =

Historic house in California, United States

- U.S. National Register of Historic Places
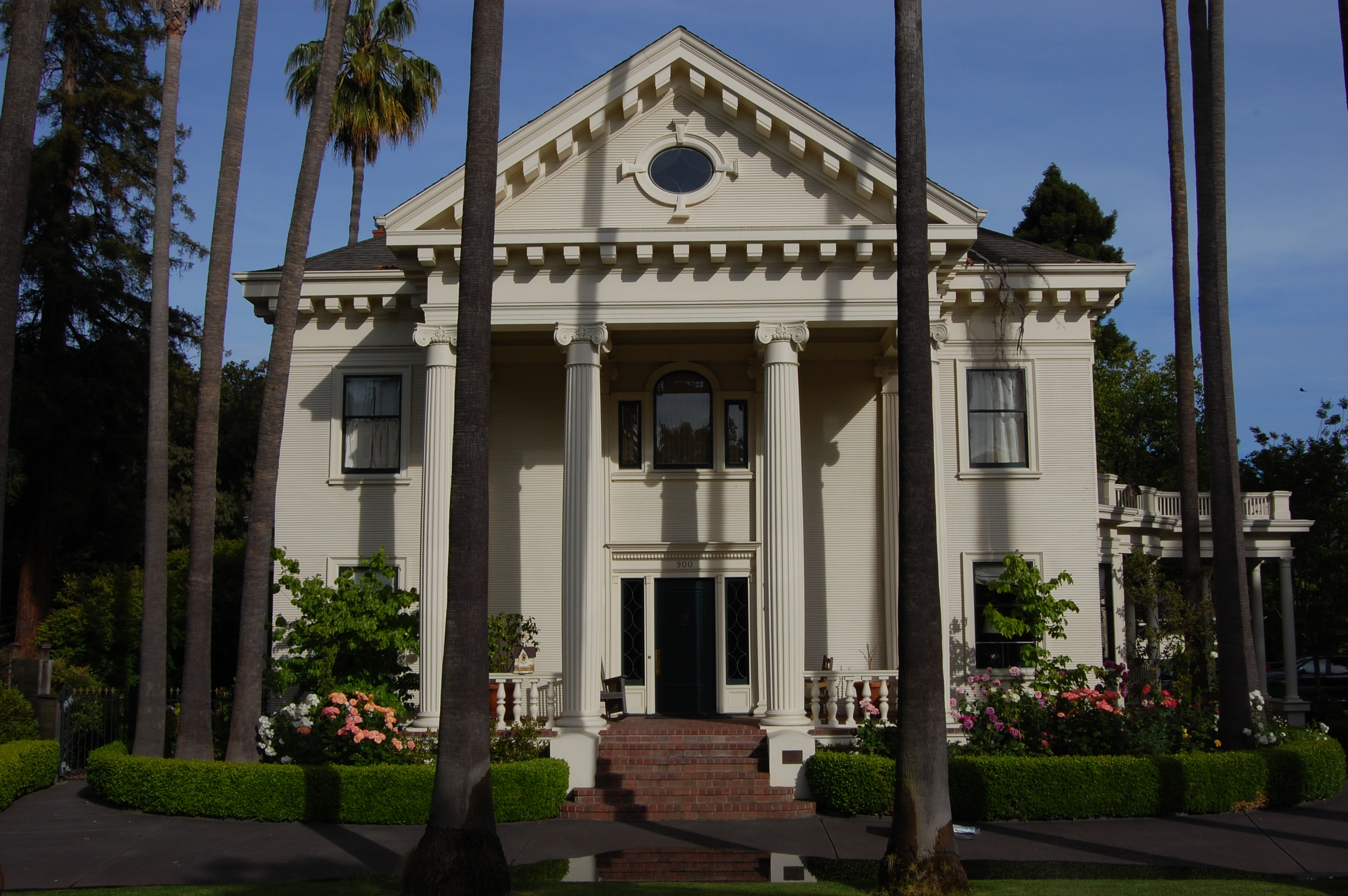
- The house in 2010

- Location within California
- Location: 900 University Avenue, Palo Alto, California
- Coordinates: 37°27′11″N 122°09′11″W
- Area: 0.2 acres (0.081 ha)
- Built: 1904
- Architect: T. Paterson Ross
- Architectural style: Neoclassical
- NRHP reference No.: 72000255
- Added to NRHP: March 6, 1972

The John Adam Squire House is a historic house in Palo Alto, California. It was built in 1904-1905 for John Adam Squire, a Greek professor. Squire lived here with his wife Georgina and their three daughters until his death in 1930. His wife died in 1959.

The house was designed by architect T. Paterson Ross in the Neoclassical architectural style. It has been listed on the National Register of Historic Places since March 6, 1972.

== Landmark status ==
The registration for the site of John Adam Squire House as a historic resource dates back to October 31, 1972. A commemorative plaque that designates this site as California Historical Landmark 857 commemorating the site of John Adam Squire House at 900 University Avenue, Palo Alto, California. The plaque was placed by the California State Parks in cooperation with the Palo Alto Historical Association and the city of Palo Alto, on January 27, 1973.

The inscription on the marker reads:

"Designed by T. Paterson Ross and constructed by builder George W. Mosher in 1904, this house is a notable example of California's interpretation of the Greco-Roman Classic Revival movement in America."
