= Memorial Cross Park =

Small city park in Santa Clara, California

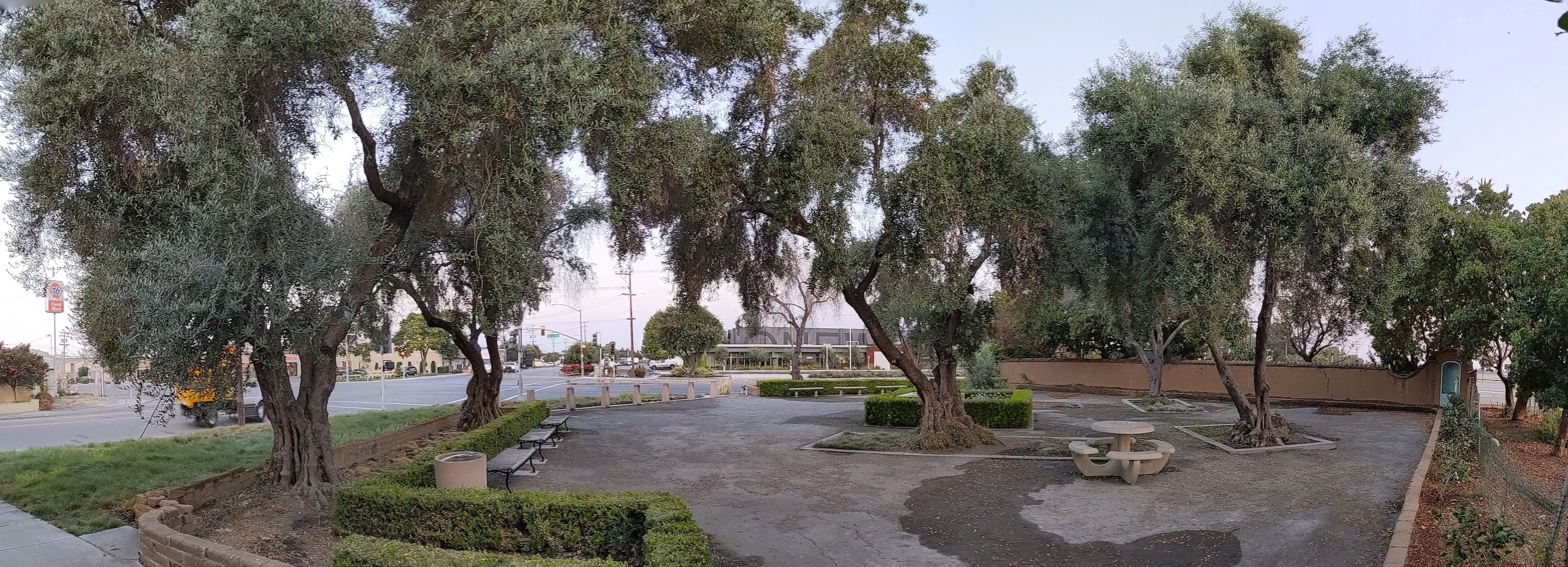
- Panorama of Memorial Cross Park
- Interactive map of Memorial Cross Park
- Nearest city: Santa Clara, California
- Coordinates: 37°22′10″N 121°56′27″W
- Area: 0.34 acres (0.14 ha)
- Created: November 19, 1907; 118 years ago
- Public transit: VTA, Route 60

Site of California's First State Capital
- Interactive map of Site of California's First State Capital

California Historical Landmark
- Designated: September 3, 1937
- Reference no.: 250

Memorial Cross Park, also known as Mission Cross Park, is a small 0.34-acre (0.14 ha) city park in Santa Clara, California which was the second, temporary site of the Mission Santa Clara de Asís, from 1779 to 1784. A large granite cross was donated to the city by a local Lions Club in 1953 and stood there until it was removed in late 2016 following a federal lawsuit filed by the Freedom from Religion Foundation.

== History ==
The Mission Santa Clara de Asís was founded along the banks of the Guadalupe River, with the first Mass held on January 12, 1777. In January 1779, the Guadalupe flooded the original site, destroying it, and a second site was blessed by Father Junipero Serra on November 11, 1779. The cornerstone for a new church was laid on November 19, 1781 at a third site, and after it was completed in May 1784, services were moved there from the temporary second site.

This second Mission site is occupied by the present Mission (or Memorial) Cross Park, at the northeast corner of the intersection of De La Cruz and Martin. The city purchased the land as a park before 1907. Reportedly, there were four structures at the second site: a church and sacristry, measuring 6×25 varas (a vara is a customary unit of measurement equal to 0.8375 m (2.75 ft)); servant's quarters (5×10 varas); a kitchen and shop (5×10 varas); and a residence and storeroom (5×45 varas). The Native American Marcello, said to be "the Last of the Mission Indians", assisted in constructing the second site. A memorial cross which had been placed near the city's Southern Pacific railroad station in 1912 to mark the second Mission site was moved approximately 200 ft (61 m) to the corner of Campbell and Franklin, where an old cornerstone had been unearthed in 1913. However, the precise locations of the first two sites have not been proven; a cultural resource management project was conducted in the late 1970s covering the purported sites prior to an expansion of San Jose International Airport, involving a surface survey and trenching, which provided no definitive evidence for the presence of the mission at the first two claimed locations.

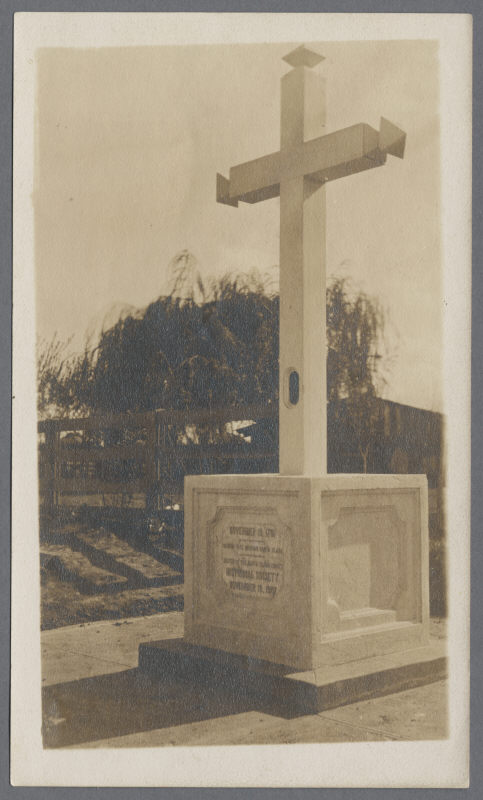
Photograph of the wooden cross at the second Mission site (1916), by P.J. Riley

On November 19, 1907, an 8 ft (2.4 m) tall wooden cross was erected at the second Mission site by the Santa Clara County Historical Society. That cross incorporated a fragment of the original 1777 cross and used the wooden timbers from the cross erected by Fr. Serra in 1781 at the third Mission site; the timbers, in turn, had been part of the first Mission building built in 1777. The original 1777 cross had been rebuilt and encased in new material in 1902 following a windstorm that had knocked it down, and the 1907 cross sealed the 1781 timbers in a similar manner. The president of Santa Clara College, Richard A. Gleeson, S.J., delivered the keynote speech during the dedication ceremony, entitled "The Birth of Christianity and Dawn of Civilization in Santa Clara Valley"; other speakers included James R. Daily, reading "The Mission Cross", a poem by Charles F. Walsh; Rev. John W. Dinsmore ("Footprints of the Padres"); and historian Dr. George Wharton James ("Junipero Serra, Pioneer of Pioneers"). Politicians attending included former San Francisco Mayor James D. Phelan, who delivered brief remarks: "I am reminded of the American traveler who received a just rebuke from Lord Byron, who refused to see him because the American had never beheld Niagara Falls. We should first see and know our own land" as well as Congressman Joseph R. Knowland.

A larger 14 ft (4.3 m) tall granite cross was dedicated at the second site on January 12, 1953; the principal speaker was Knowland (this time, as President of the California Historical Society) and Santa Clara Mayor William P. Kiely accepted the cross on behalf of the city. The granite cross was originally donated by the local Lions Club. It weighs 23 short tons (21 t) and was cut in Santa Rosa by Massimo Galeazzi to a design by John Costa, although Jess Talancon would claim credit for design and execution in the 1970s; the granite was quarried from Rocklin. The park was developed in 1956, and the cross was rededicated to the city in 1961. The city of Santa Clara considers it a mini park with 0.34 acres (0.14 ha) of area.

Memorial Cross Park

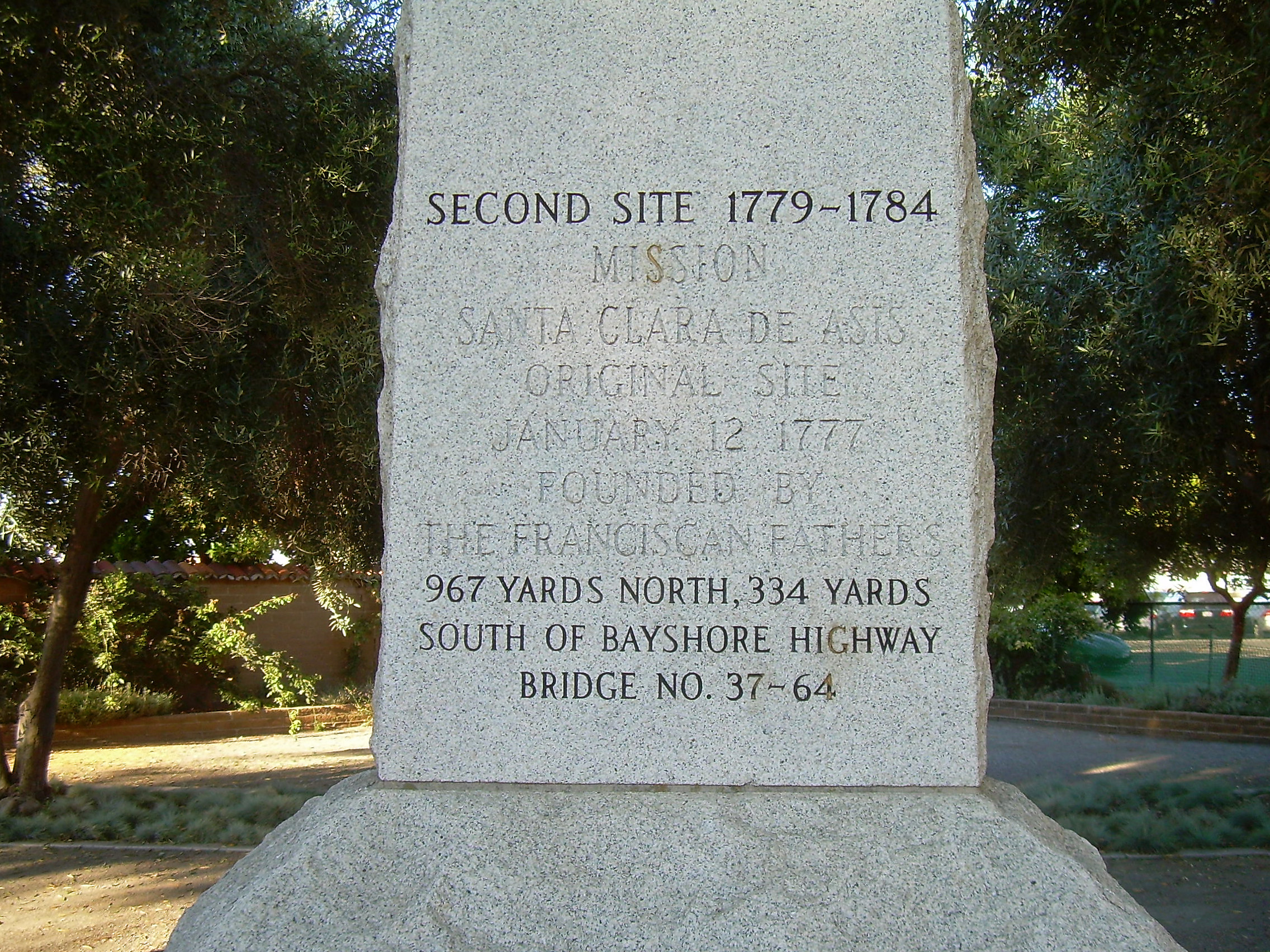
Inscription noted this was the original site; later amended to note it was second.

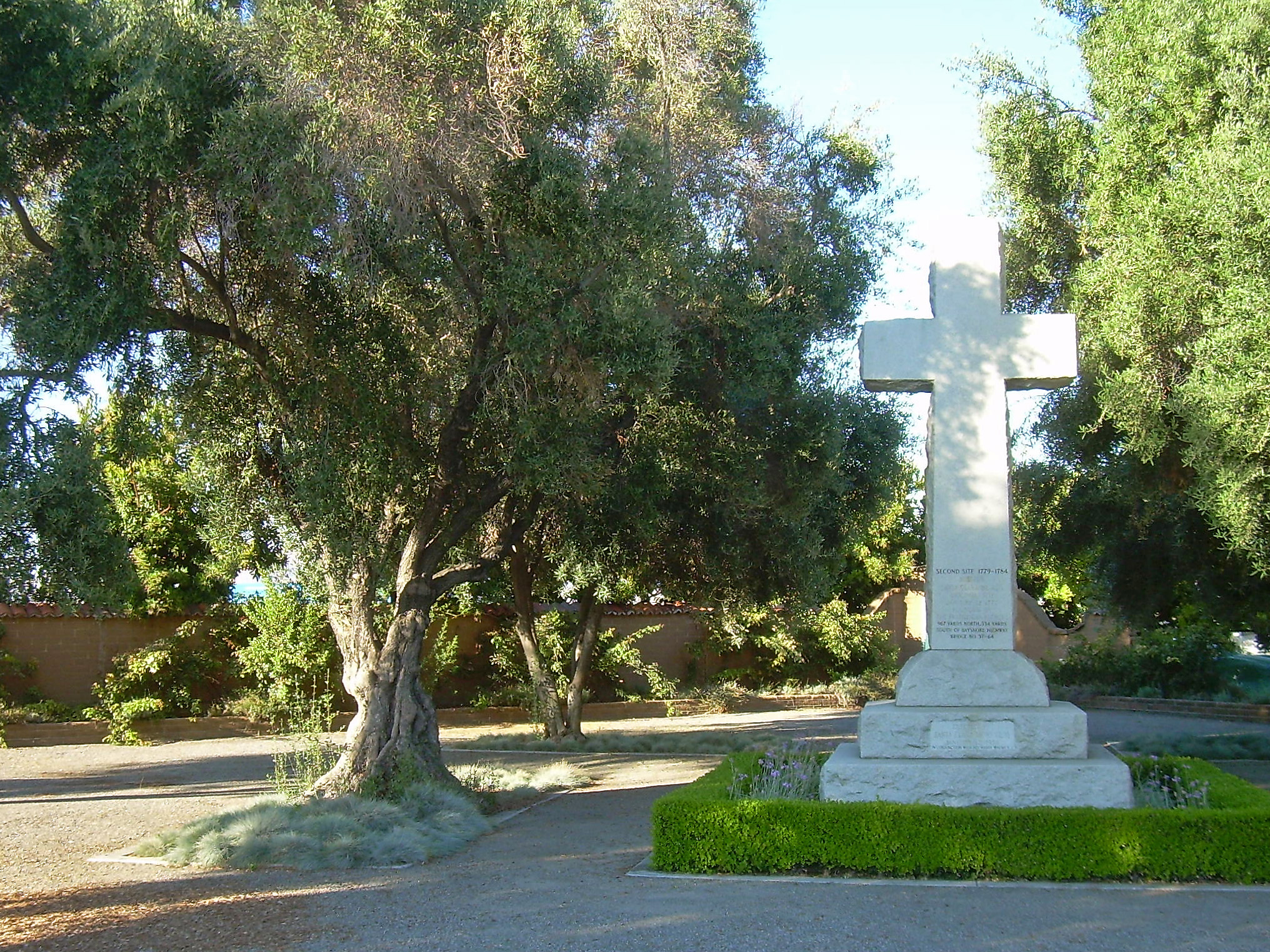
2010 (with cross)

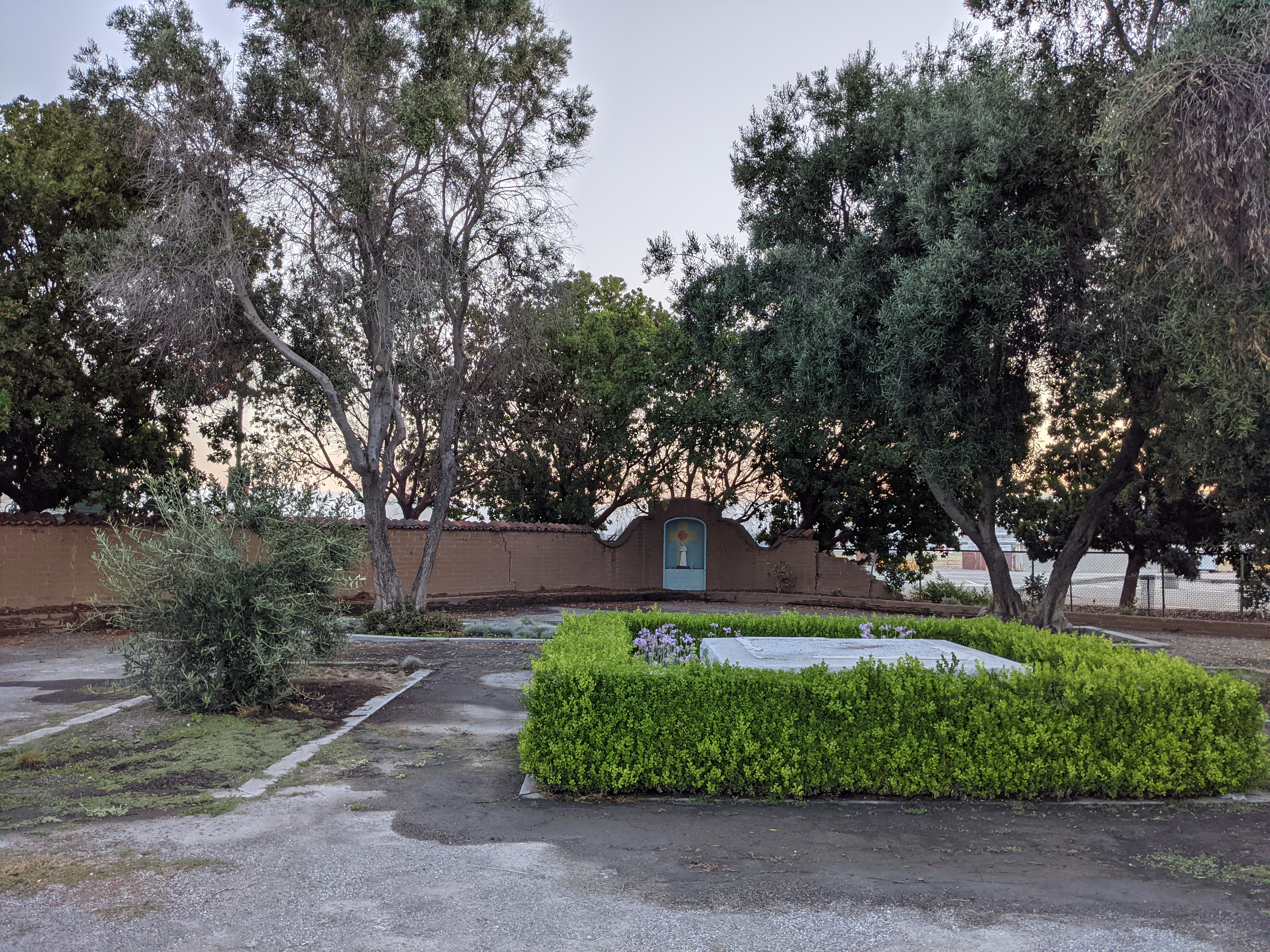
2021 (cross removed)

The Freedom from Religion Foundation (FFRF) complained in 2012 the granite cross, sited on public land, violated the Constitutional separation of church and state in the United States. FFRF followed by filing a federal lawsuit on April 20, 2016 in the Northern District of California, with the suit heard by Judge Lucy H. Koh. City attorney Richard Nosky recommended to the City Council in November 2016 that ownership of the cross be transferred to Santa Clara University (SCU), with SCU bearing the cost of removal and moving; the council unanimously approved the recommendation. The city removed the cross on December 27, 2016.

The grounds of Memorial Cross Park are landscaped with oleander and olives, and adobe perimeter walls similar to early mission days bound the site. Low-maintenance grass was installed along the street edge in 2018.

== Landmark status ==
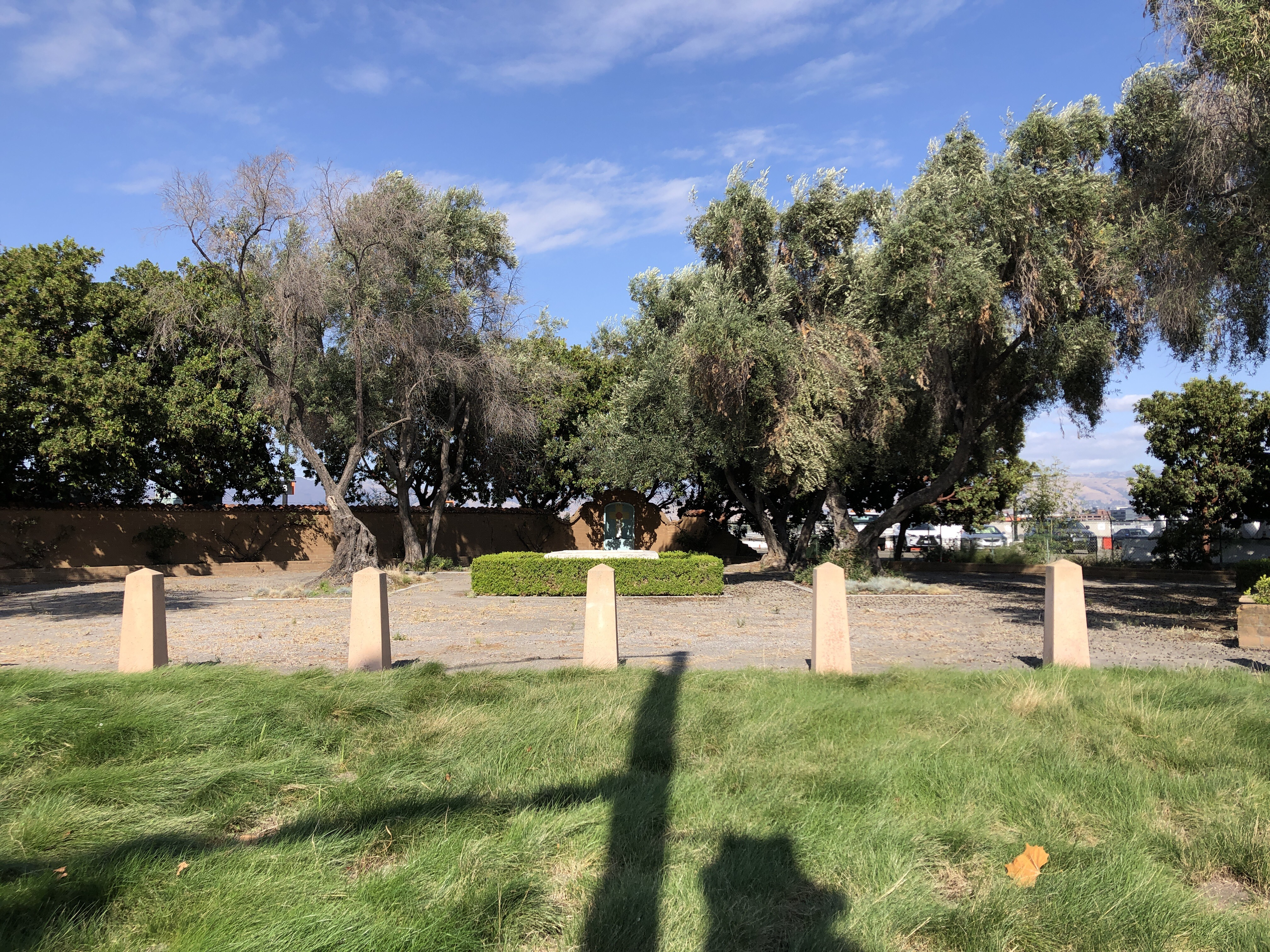
Old Site of Mission Santa Clara de Asis

On September 3, 1937, the State Historic Preservation Office designated the old sites of Mission Santa Clara de Asis and old spanish bridge as a California Historical Landmark #250. A description on the commemorative plaque reads: "The first mission in this valley, Mission Santa Clara de Thamien, was established at this site by Franciscan Padres Tomás de la Peña and Joseph Antonio Marguia January 17, 1777. Here, at the Indian village of So-co-is-u-ka, they erected a cross and shelter for worship to bring Christianity to the Costanoan Indians."
