= Gubserville, California =

American historic town

- Gubserville
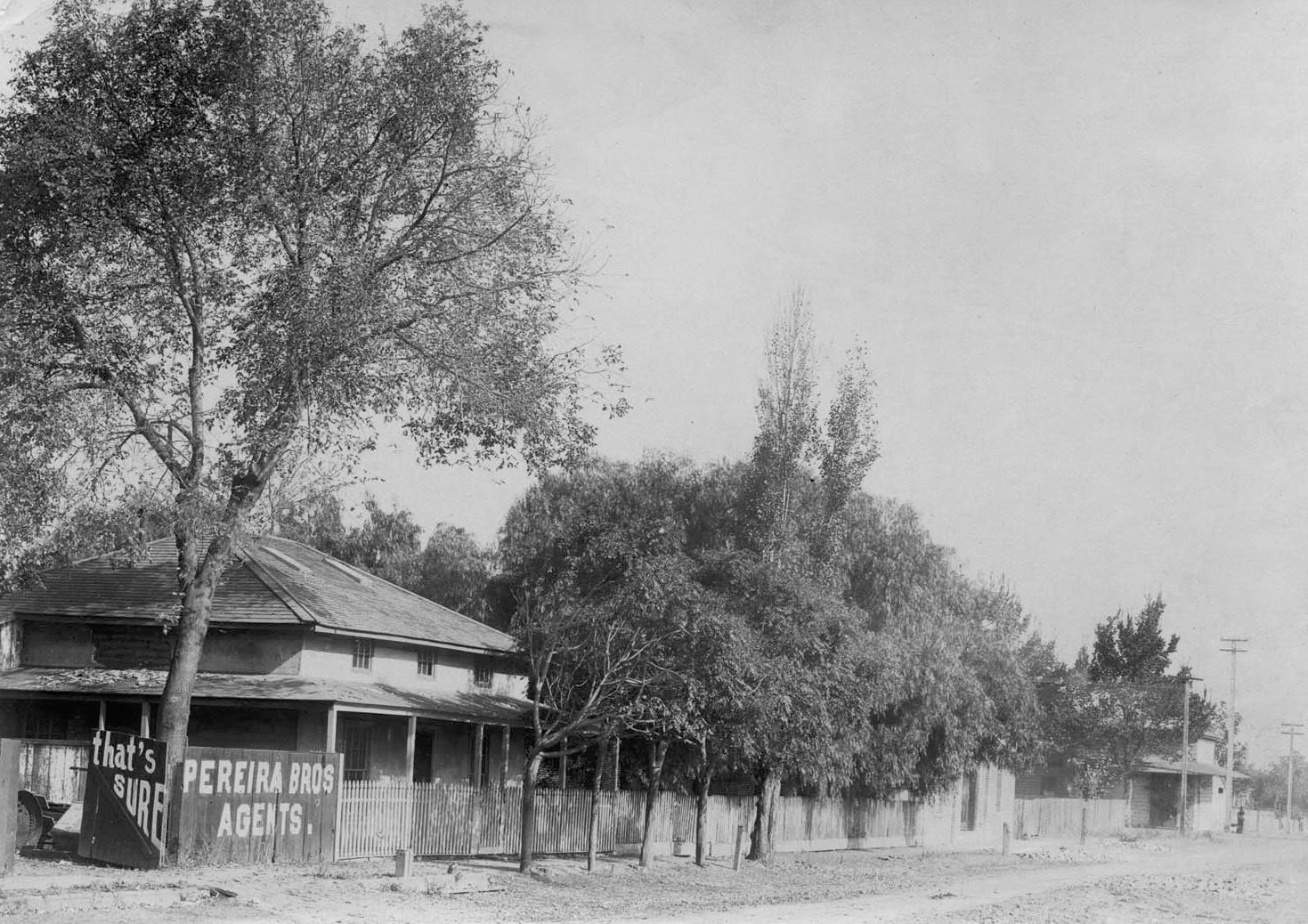
- Gubserville in 1904

- Location in Santa Clara County, California
- 37°17′47″N 121°59′14″W
- Location: 1481 Saratoga Ave, San Jose, California, US
- Nearest city: Saratoga, California

History
- Founder: Frank Gubser
- Built: July 5, 1882

California Historical Landmark
- Official name: Gubserville
- Designated: April 19, 1986
- Reference no.: 447

Gubserville (/ˈɡb, sr, vəl/) was a historic stagecoach, mail, and teamster stop along the road between West San Jose and Saratoga in Santa Clara County, California, United States. The early settlement was named after Frank Gubser, a German immigrant who worked as a barber, saloon keeper, and served as the village's first and only postmaster since July 5, 1882. Gubserville ceased to exist when the post office discontinued operations in 1899. Today, the old ghost of Gubserville is marked by the California Historical Landmark #447.

== History ==
In 1882, Gubserville emerged as a small townsite, providing the first stop along the Saratoga-Santa Clara Road (now Saratoga Avenue) on the stagecoach route departing from Santa Clara. This was the location where the stagecoach driver stopped to exchange mail. This community was situated in the County Lane neighborhood of West San Jose and used to extend through the Rancho Quito region, close to Saratoga Creek. The Gubserville U.S, post office operated from July 5, 1882 to April 15, 1899.

The town earned its name from Frank Gubser, who held the roles of barber, saloon keeper, and postmaster. In 1905, Gubserville had a blacksmith shop, a Methodist church, and a two-story school. George W. Forbes operated the blacksmith shop and was known for creating the "Forbes Cultivator" used in agriculture. In the San Jose directory of ninety-two household heads from that era, prominent family names included Farr, Cox, and McCoy.

During the 1880s, Frank Gubser's "Halfway House" was a layover on the northwest side of Saratoga Avenue, situated between San Jose and Saratoga. This establishment functioned as the local tavern, stagecoach stop, and a post office that catered to travelers and tradespeople journeying to and from Saratoga. Beer in wooden barrels was transported by horse-drawn wagons to the Halfway House.

The United States post office in Gubserville ceased operations on April 15, 1899, and was absorbed by the Santa Clara post office. over time, both the town and its businesses integrated into the surrounding communities. Nerveless, it remained customary to refer to this as Gubserville as late as the 1920s.

In 1951, the only structure that remained standing in the settlement was the Forbes residence. This two-story house, constructed from native redwood, consisted of seven rooms.

== See also ==
- List of cities and towns in California
- California Historical Landmarks in Santa Clara County
