= Mission Santa Clara de Asís =

18th-century Spanish mission in California

Mission Santa Clara
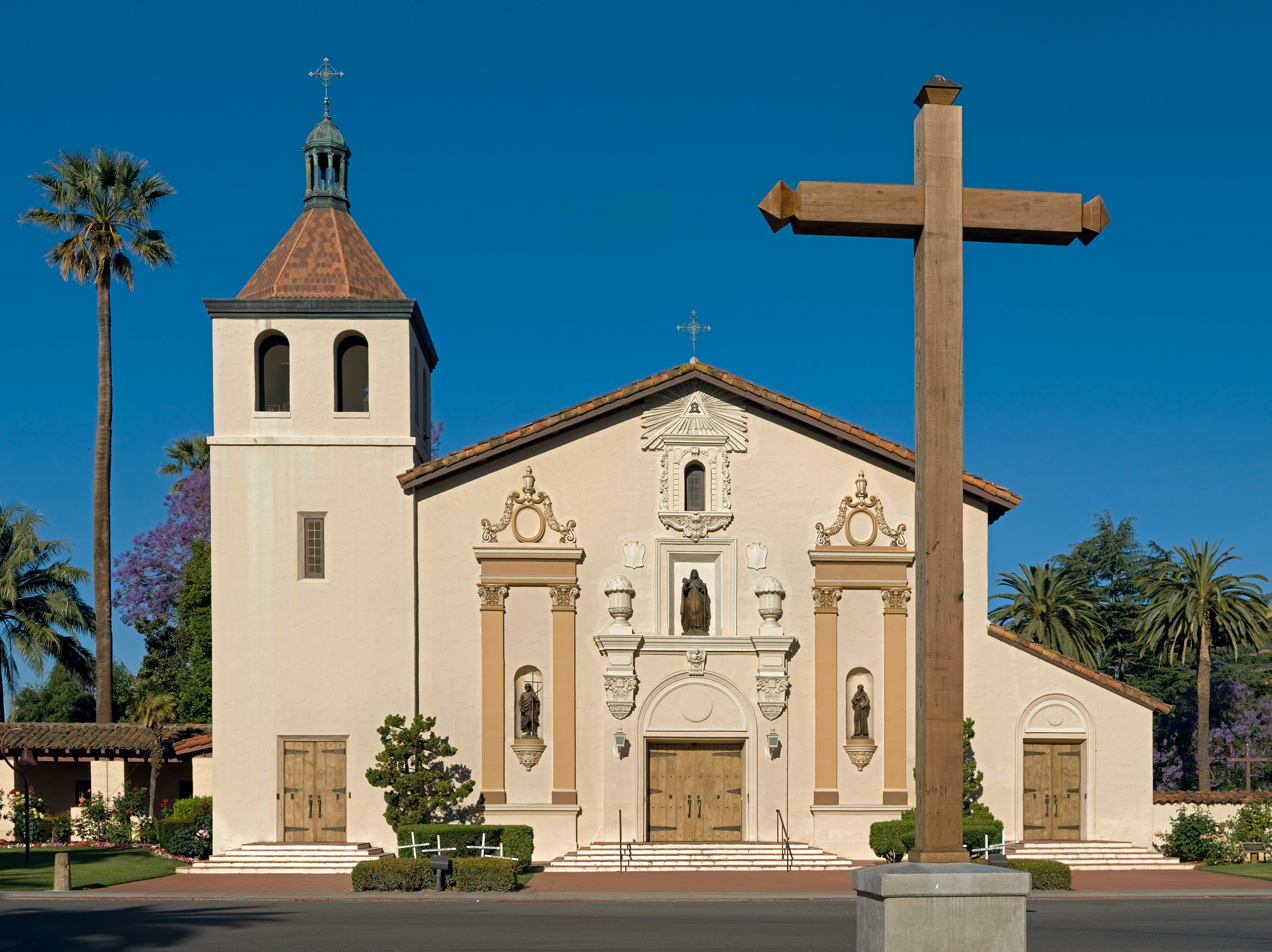
- Mission Santa Clara de Asís, shown in 2008

- Location in Santa Clara County
- Location: Palm Drive and Alviso Street intersection, Santa Clara University, Santa Clara, California
- Coordinates: 37.3493°N 121.9415°W
- Name as founded: La Misión Santa Clara de Asís
- English translation: The Mission of Saint Clare of Assisi
- Founded: January 12, 1777
- Founded by: Father Presidente Junípero Serra (Note: Though Serra is generally credited with the Mission's founding, it was Father Tomás de la Peña who actually celebrated the first mass at the site.)
- Founding Order: Eighth
- Military district: Fourth
- Native tribe: Bay Miwok, Tamyen, Yokuts; Costeño
- Native place name: Socoisuka
- Baptisms: 8,536 (Note: Mission Santa Clara witnessed the greatest number of baptisms, marriages, and burials of any settlement in the Alta California chain.)
- Marriages: 2,498
- Burials: 6,809
- Neophyte population: 1,125
- Secularized: 1836
- Governing body: Santa Clara University; Roman Catholic Diocese of San Jose
- Current use: University chapel; Parish church

California Historical Landmark
- Reference no.: #338

Website
- www.scu.edu/missionchurch/

Mission Santa Clara de Asís (Spanish: Misión Santa Clara de Asís) is a Spanish mission in the city of Santa Clara, California. The mission, which was the eighth in California, was founded on January 12, 1777, by the Franciscans. Named for Saint Clare of Assisi, who founded the order of the Poor Clares and was an early companion of St. Francis of Assisi, this was the first California mission to be named in honor of a woman.

It is the namesake of both the city and county of Santa Clara, as well as of Santa Clara University, which was built around the mission. This is the only mission located on the grounds of a university campus. Although ruined and rebuilt six times, the settlement was never abandoned, and today it functions as the university chapel for Santa Clara University.

== History ==
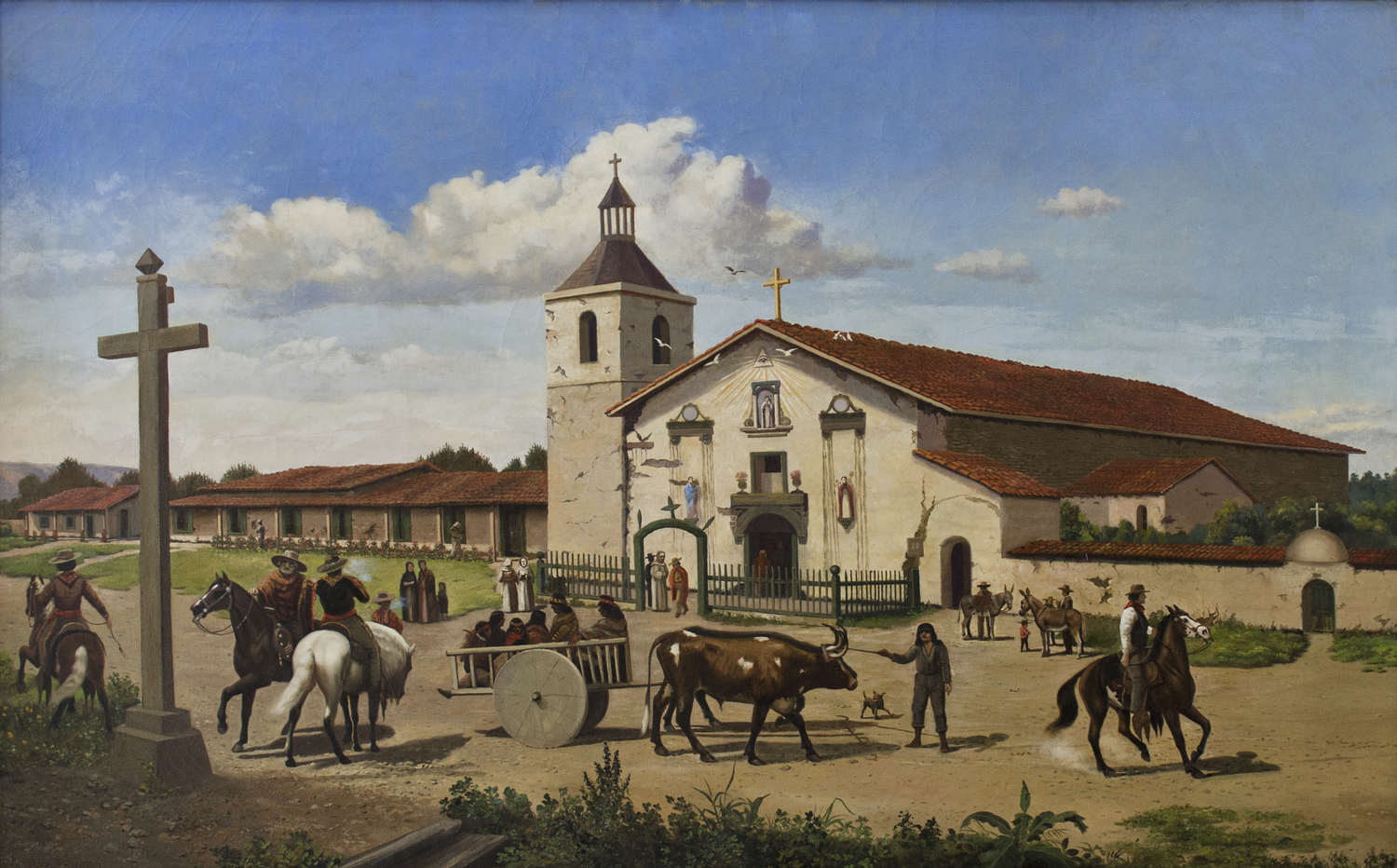
Painting of Mission Santa Clara, 1849.

The outpost was originally established as La Misión Santa Clara de Thamien (or Mission Santa Clara de Thamien, a reference to the Tamien people) at the Native American village of So-co-is-u-ka (meaning "Laurelwood", located on the Guadalupe River) on January 12, 1777. There the Franciscan brothers erected a cross and shelter for worship to bring Christianity to the Ohlone people. When Spanish entered into Santa Clara it was Fray Tomás de la Pena who enlisted Junipero Serra to spread christianity to the Ohlone people. This played a very big role for the future of Santa Clara changing their tradition once Junipero Serra arrived in Santa Clara. The Ohlone people started attending masses and began receiving supplies from the missions.Floods, fires, and earthquakes damaged many of the early structures and forced relocation to higher ground. The second site is known as Mission Santa Clara de Asís. A subsequent site of the mission dating from 1784 to 1819 is located several hundred yards west of the De La Cruz overpass of the Caltrain track; moreover, several Native American burial sites have been discovered near this subsequent site. The current site, home to the first college in Alta California, dates back to 1825.

The Six Churches of Santa Clara de Asís
Construction Number	Dates of Use	Date of Abandonment	Cause	Materials	Cemetery
1	1777–1779	1779	flooding	wood	yes
2	1779–1784	1784	abandoned	wood	yes
3	1784–1818	1818–1825	earthquake, water	adobe	yes
4	1818–1825	1867	demolition	adobe	no
5	1825–1926	1926	fire	adobe	yes (in use from 1825–1851)
6 (same site as 5)	1928–present			masonry	no

The six churches were built from 1777- present. Each one has been created and destroyed by different causes. Each church has been built with different materials and with different foundations. All showing how each church was unique. Throughout the history of the missions, the churches were repeatedly destroyed and rebuilt six times, each reconstruction using distinct materials to highlight the uniqueness of each church to the community. This was reflective of the Ohlone people's experience, as they were compelled to relocate frequently, adapting to new environments. They consistently attended masses led by Father Junipero Serra.

The first mission was an adobe structure that was near the Guadalupe River near the north end of San Jose International airport. It was later moved to its current location in Santa Clara University. An Indian chief who lived near the river said that the ruins of the adobe was the first Santa Clara Mission.

The second mission was used as a staging point for the construction of the third mission also called the Murguia Mission. The cornerstone for this adobe was built on November 19, 1781. In 1812 and 1818 there were earthquakes at the mission which caused the mission to be shaken and damaged. Before being torn down in 1777, the first complex was built en palisada. A palisada is a wooden post construction with earthen roofs covered with tule reed thatching. Once moved, Junípero Serra dedicated the church on May 16, 1784. He said it was the best and largest of all the missions.

The third mission and quadrangle complex was abandoned. A new building was used and the tejas from the third site were removed and reused. Since the mission did not have tiles the adobe walls began to melt. By the end of the 19th century the complex was gone. Years later when the third mission was gone the adjacent adobe housing area was demolished and replaced with the new Euromerican immigrants that came to Santa Clara during the gold rush.

In the fourth mission they were building the new quadrangle, and adobe building was erected from the east of the construction site. In 1818 and 1819 Informes describes the building and finishing of the church with ladrillos and tejas.

The fifth mission church was constructed in 1822 and 1825 in the same place that the six mission stands today. When the fifth mission got destroyed by fire in October 1926. After the mission got destroyed the other adobe buildings that compromised the complex were demolished to make classrooms and dormitories for Santa Clara University.

Initially, there was tension between the people of the mission and those in the nearby Pueblo de San Josè over disputed ownership rights of land and water. The tension was relieved when a road, the Alameda, was built by two hundred Native Americans to link the communities together. On Sundays, people from San Jose would come to the mission for services, until the building of St. Joseph's Church in 1803. In that year, the mission of Santa Clara reported a Native American population of 1,271. In the same tabular report, its resident priest estimated that 10,000 cattle, 9,500 sheep, 730 horses, 35 mules, and 55 swine were on mission lands, while about 3,000 fanegas of grain (some 220 pounds (100 kg) each of wheat, barley or corn) had been harvested. The Ohlone people had small settlements and lived on hunting and gathering. When spanish came to the indians it forced them to begin civilization. They forced the people of the land to have to change their ways from before to rely on the Spanish. for their supplies and pressured them to follow traditions of the spanish.

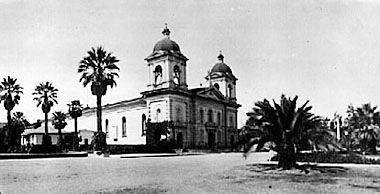
Mission Santa Clara de Asís, c. 1910

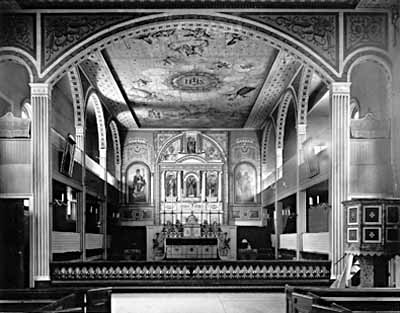
A view toward the altar of the exquisitely ornate Mission Santa Clara de Asís chapel, c. 1897

After the Mexican secularization act of 1833 most of the mission's land and livestock was sold off by Mexico. The mission land was subdivided, and the land sold to whoever could afford it which often meant it was sold to government officials and with half of the mission land going to Native Americans. Most of the buildings continued to be used as a parish church, unlike the other missions in California. By 1836, the mission Native Americans were "freed" by the Mexican government. And Ohlone people still had family and friends in San Pedro y San Pablo. With the possibility of after being freed by the Mexicans fled back to this was also supported with the idea that. San Pablo carried a ancestral line even after the missions in San Pablo. The local land near the mission had drastically changed in the 60 years of mission operation under the Spanish and many of the native plants needed for Native American survival were gone. Also this was Detrimental since the Native Americans relied on plants not only as a food supplement but also for medicine. There were 265 species of medicinal plants used by the people. After the missions period there was these were all altered after the missions. Requiring a change from the former lifestyle for many Native Americans. Many Native Americans fled to the Central Valley of California, others stayed locally and worked for the new ranchos. There were a few small and short-lived Native American villages established around the Bay Area by 1839; many of these villages could not support themselves, so they began raiding the nearby ranchos. Juan Prado Mesa was the figure that was able to stop the raids. Once over he was rewarded with 4000 acres of land within the area of los altos. This would soon be known as the Ranch San Antonio. Minor parts of land returned back to the Ohlone people. While it was small fractures of the land. One main place was Ulistac which was a land important to the Ohlone men. After the Secularization act of 1833 it reverted back to the farming land. This was seen as one of the rare instances where after the missions the Ohlone people still had control of their homes.

In 1850, California became a state. With that change, priests of the Jesuit order took over the Mission Santa Clara de Asís in 1851 from the Franciscans. Father John Nobili, S.J., was put in charge of the mission. He began a college on the mission site in 1851, which grew into Santa Clara University; it is the only mission to become part of a university, and it is also the oldest university in California. Throughout the history of the mission, the bells have rung faithfully every evening, a promise made to King Charles III of Spain when he sent the original bells to the mission in 1777. He asked that the bells be rung each evening at 8:30 in memory of those who had died, although the actual bells have since been replaced by a recording. The bell tower has three bells; one was donated by King Carlos IV but subsequently destroyed in a fire. King Alphonso XIII donated a replacement bell, which is on display in the de Saisset Museum (in the mission).

In 1861, a new wooden façade with two bell towers was attached over the old adobe front of the building. The interior was widened in 1885 to increase the seating capacity by removing the original adobe nave walls. A fire in 1925 destroyed the structure, including the surrounding wall. The church's parochial functions were transferred to the Saint Clare Parish west of the campus. A rebuilt and restored Mission Santa Clara was consecrated in 1929, when it assumed its primary modern function as chapel and centerpiece of the university campus. It is open to visitors daily; the mission museum is located in the university's De Saisset Museum. The original mission cemetery, still in use, is located on nearby Lincoln Street.

== Santa Clara Mission Cemetery ==
Santa Clara Mission Cemetery, also known as Santa Clara Catholic Cemetery, was founded in 1777, alongside the mission by the same Franciscans. In 1851, when Santa Clara College was founded, the cemetery near the mission was running out of space, so they moved the location a few minutes walk from the mission near the adobe home of Fernando Berryessa, son of Maria Zacharias Bernal y Berryessa.

In the 1930s, this cemetery completed its first indoor mausoleum. In part due to the popularity of mausoleum burial, in 2015, they began building the St. Ignatius Outdoor Mausoleum Complex.

The Santa Clara de Asis mission was home to many indigenous groups like the Ohlone/Costanoan, Yokuts, and Miwok ancestry. All these indigenous groups have been buried at the mission. These cemeteries have shown many signs of native mortuary practices. There is data from the burial records from 1777 where it tells us about the burials and the causes of death. Many of the objects that were left with the deceased can be put in a group of mortuary practices.

The Native groups had their own formal ceremonies and have strong beliefs. When the indigenous people were putting the people in their graves, they would put them in a different position then what we usually do today. Many of the deceased were laid in a flexed position but there were others who were laid to rest in an extended position, or they had the people's remains redeposited. They used many things in burial ceremonies like shell beads, glass beads, boot-spur parts, and bone awl. Archaeologist found four humans remain at the site.

Glass Beads from the 1825-1851
Bead Type	Color/Munsell	Size Range	Count
Seed	White/N9	1.0 to 4.5mm dia.,0.5 to 3.5mm length	494
Drawn	Ivory/5Y 81	1.5 to 5mm dia., 1.0 to 4mm length	1118
Drawn and Faceted	Royal Blue 5B 3/2	5.0 to 6mm dia, 5mm length	3
Drawn and Barrel Shaped	Royal Blue 5B 3/2	3.0 to 5.5mm dia., 5.0 to 6mm length	21
Cornaline d'Alepo type DIVa6	Red and Green	2.0 to 5mm dia., 2.0 to 4mm length	214
Cornaline d'Alepo	Red and White	3.0mm dia., 2.0mm length	1
Wire Wound	Light Blue 5B 5/1	9.0 to 11mm dia., 8.0 to 9mm length	7

In California missions, the last features of the burials were the inclusion of personal items of adornment, shells and glass beads. In the third mission, cemetery there are 6,000 shells and 484 glass beads were found in burials. In the fifth mission's cemetery there are over 2,000 beads. Glass beads were manufactured by Europeans. The beads were found among a lot of burials and in the screening of back dirt. Glass beads totaled 2347 and had both wire wound and drawn beads. Glass beads found in Santa Clara were manufactured in Venice or Bohemia.

=== Notable burials ===
- Peter Hardeman Burnett (1807–1895), judge, the first elected governor of California, serving from December 20, 1849, to January 9, 1851, and the first to resign from office.
- Marv Owen (1906–1991), baseball player for the Detroit Tigers (1931–37), Chicago White Sox (1938–39) and Boston Red Sox (1940) and a baseball coach.
- Bernard D. Murphy (1841–1911) Canadian-born American politician, businessman and banker
- Daniel Martin Murphy (1826–1882) Canadian-born American settler and rancher in California
- Martin Murphy Jr. (1807–1884) Irish-born American settler, farmer, rancher, and founder of Sunnyvale, California
- Martin Murphy Sr. (1785–1865) Irish-born American settler, farmer, and founder of San Martin, California
- Patrick W. Murphy (1837–1901) Canadian-born American politician, rancher
- Cardinal Ignatius Kung Pin-Mei (1901–2000), Catholic Bishop of Shanghai, China, from 1950 until his death in 2000.
- Elizabeth Murphy Taaffe (1844–1875) American settler, rancher, and founder of Los Altos Hills, California
- Archbishop Dominic Tang (1908–1995), Chinese Jesuit priest and Bishop in 1951 and later archbishop of Canton.
- Tiburcio Vásquez (1835–1875), Californio bandido who was active in California from 1854 to 1874.

== See also ==
- Spanish missions in California
- List of Spanish missions in California
- USNS Mission Santa Clara (AO-132) – a Buenaventura-class
