= Almaden Valley, San Jose =

Neighborhood of San Jose, California, U.S.

Almaden Spanish: Almadén
- Neighborhood of San Jose
- Almaden Valley; Spanish: Valle de Almadén
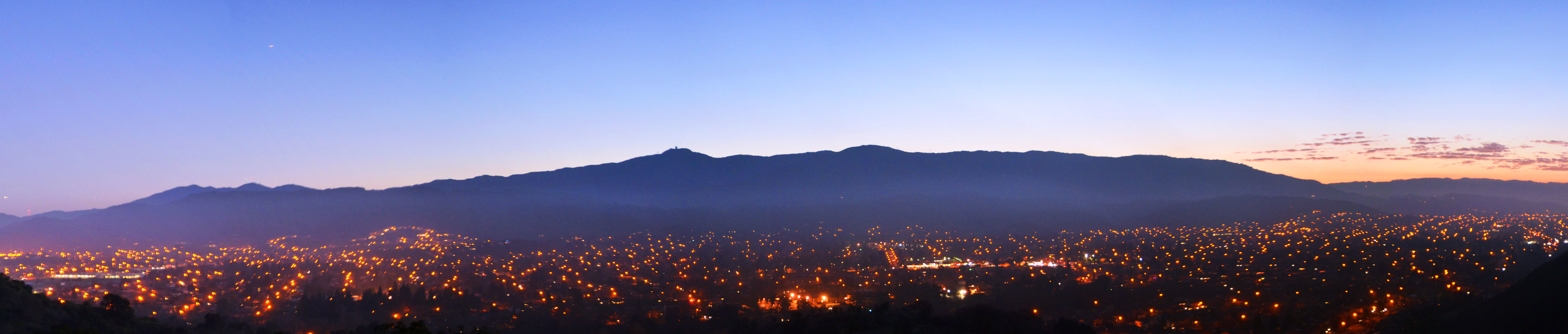
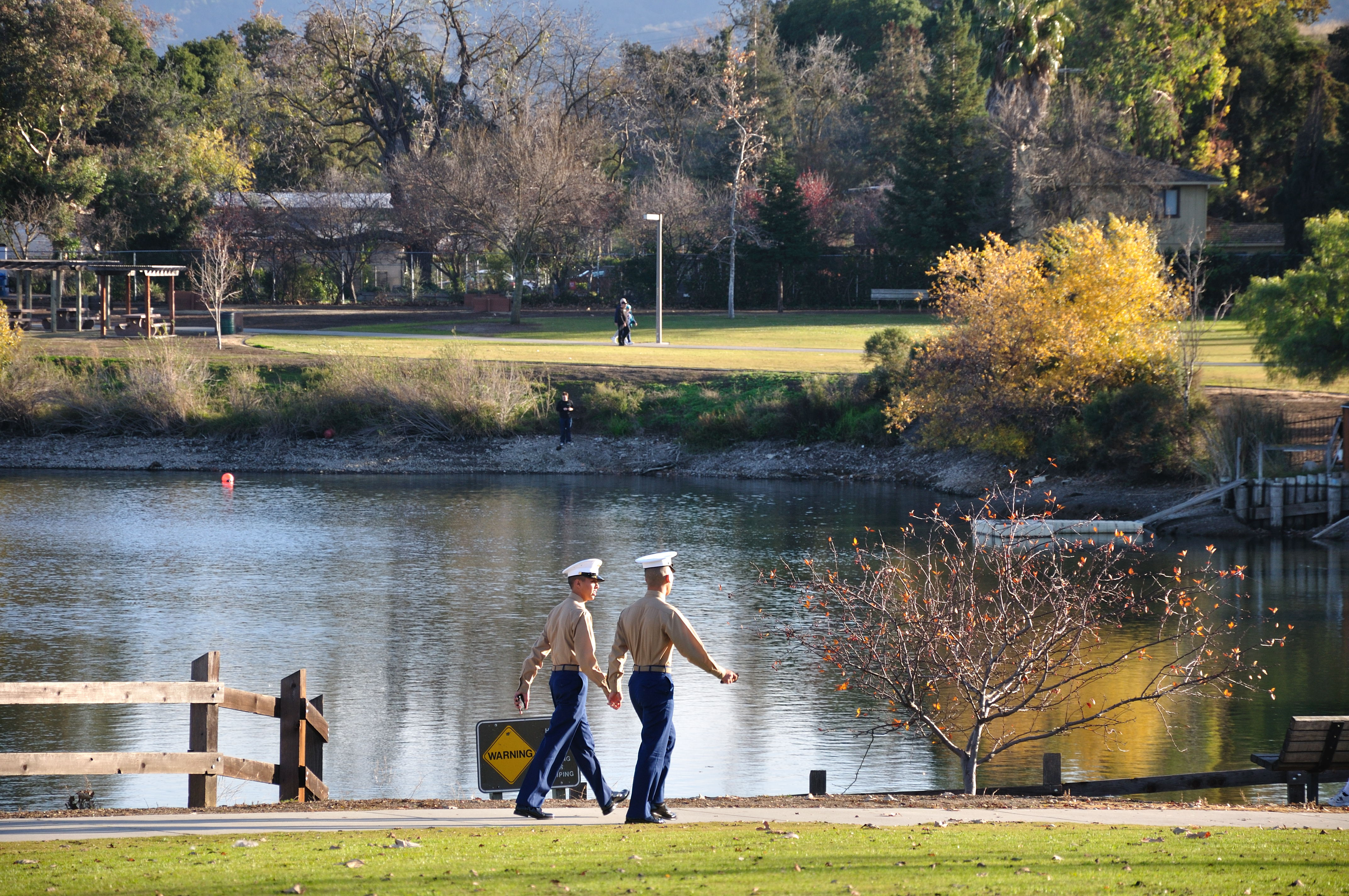
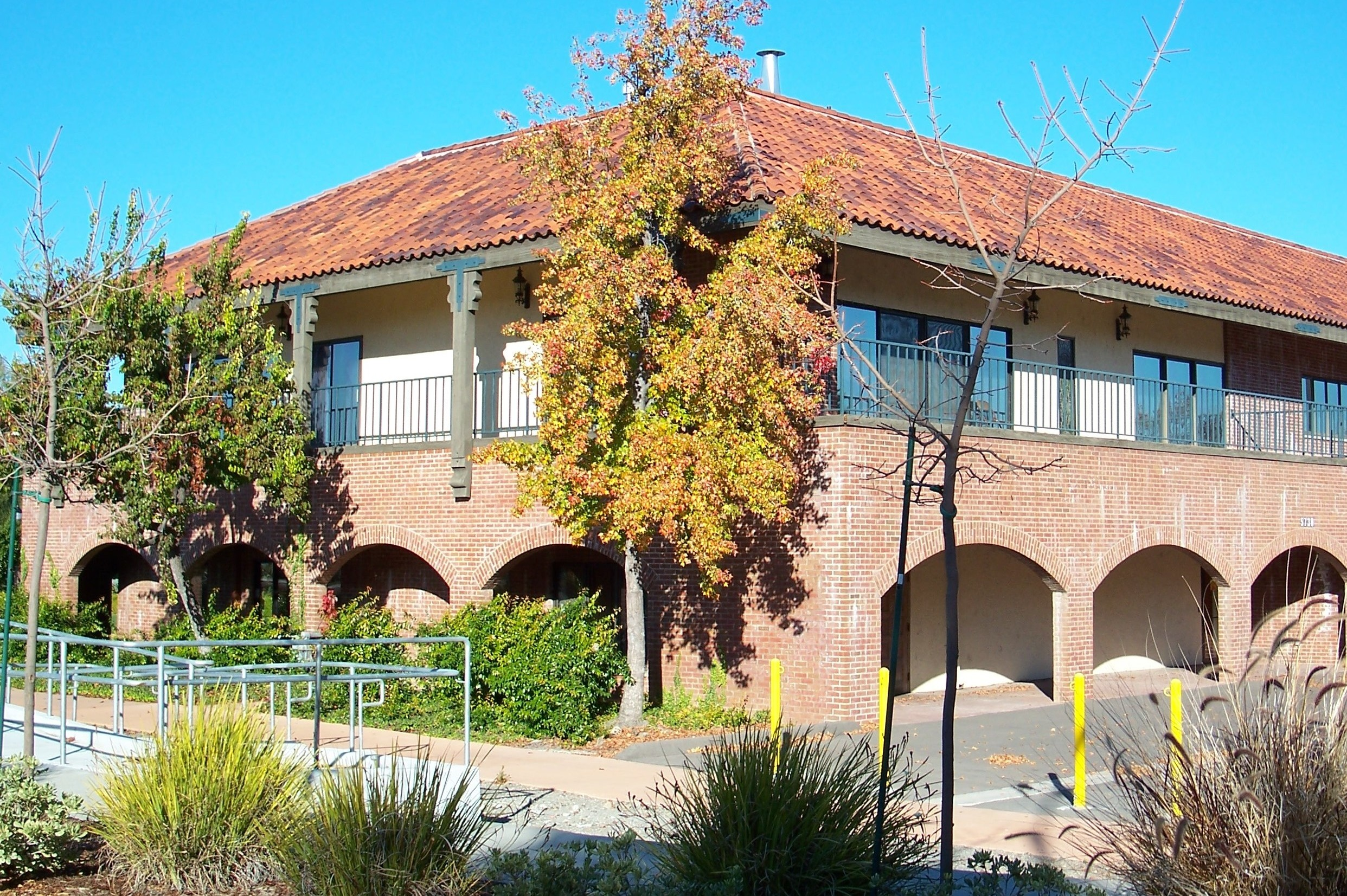
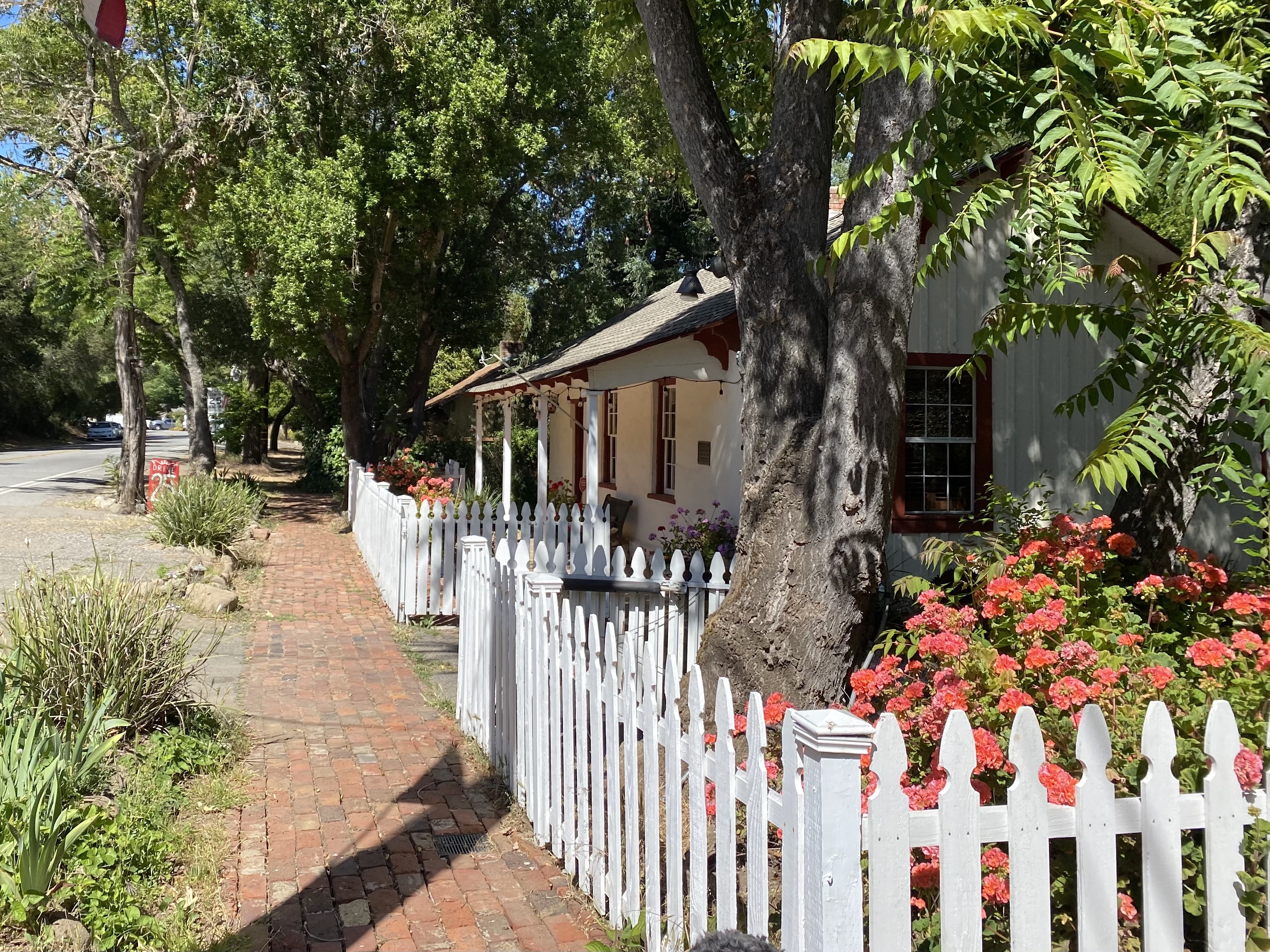
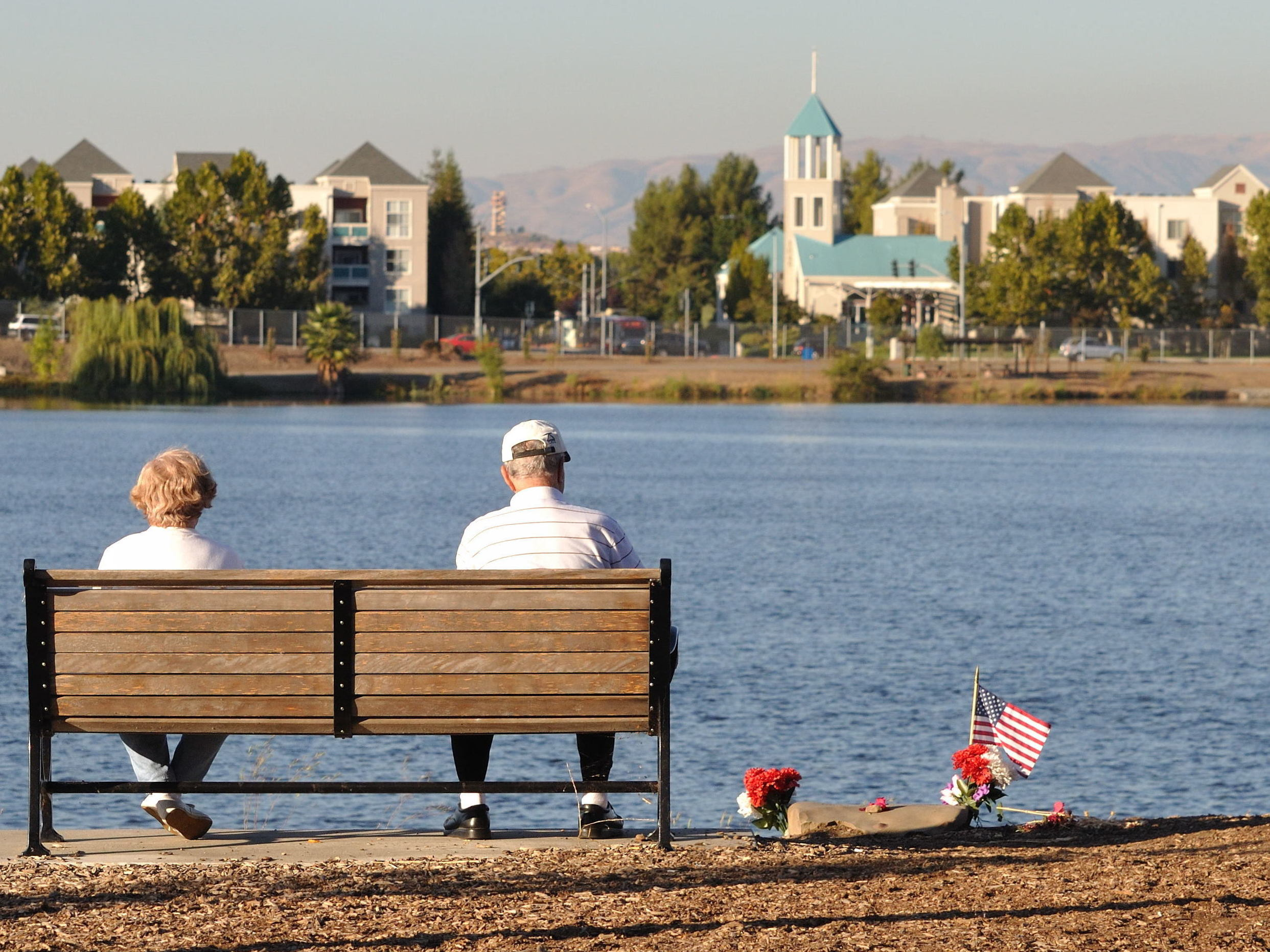
- Clockwise: panorama of Almaden Valley; the Old Almaden Winery; Almaden Lake Park; New Almaden Historic District; Almaden Lake Park

- Location within San Jose
- Coordinates: 37.2214°N 121.8622°W
- Country: United States
- State: California
- County: Santa Clara
- City: San Jose
- Zip Code: 95120

Almaden Valley (Spanish: Valle de Almadén), commonly known simply as Almaden (Spanish: Almadén), is a valley and neighborhood of San Jose, California, located in South San Jose. It is nestled between the Santa Cruz Mountains to the west and the Santa Teresa Hills to the east, bordering the town of Los Gatos and West San Jose neighborhood.

Almaden, named after the ancient Spanish mining town of Almadén, traces its history back to the 1820s, when Mexican miners discovered mercury deposits on Rancho Los Capitancillos, which later led to the establishment of the New Almaden mines. Almaden Valley, known for its abundant parkland and affluence, is one of the most expensive neighborhoods to live in San Jose and the San Francisco Bay Area and is consistently ranked as one of the most expensive areas in the country.

== History ==
Almaden was originally inhabited by the Tamien nation of Ohlone people, prior to the arrival of the Spanish. The Ohlone had long utilized the area for its cinnabar, which they used for paint production.

During the Mexican era, the area of what is now Almaden was divided between two rancho grants: Rancho San Vicente, granted to José de los Reyes Berryessa, and Rancho Los Capitancillos, granted to Justo Larios. Rancho Cañada de los Capitancillos and Rancho Cañada de Oro were later divided from these original ranchos.

=== Nuevo Almadén ===
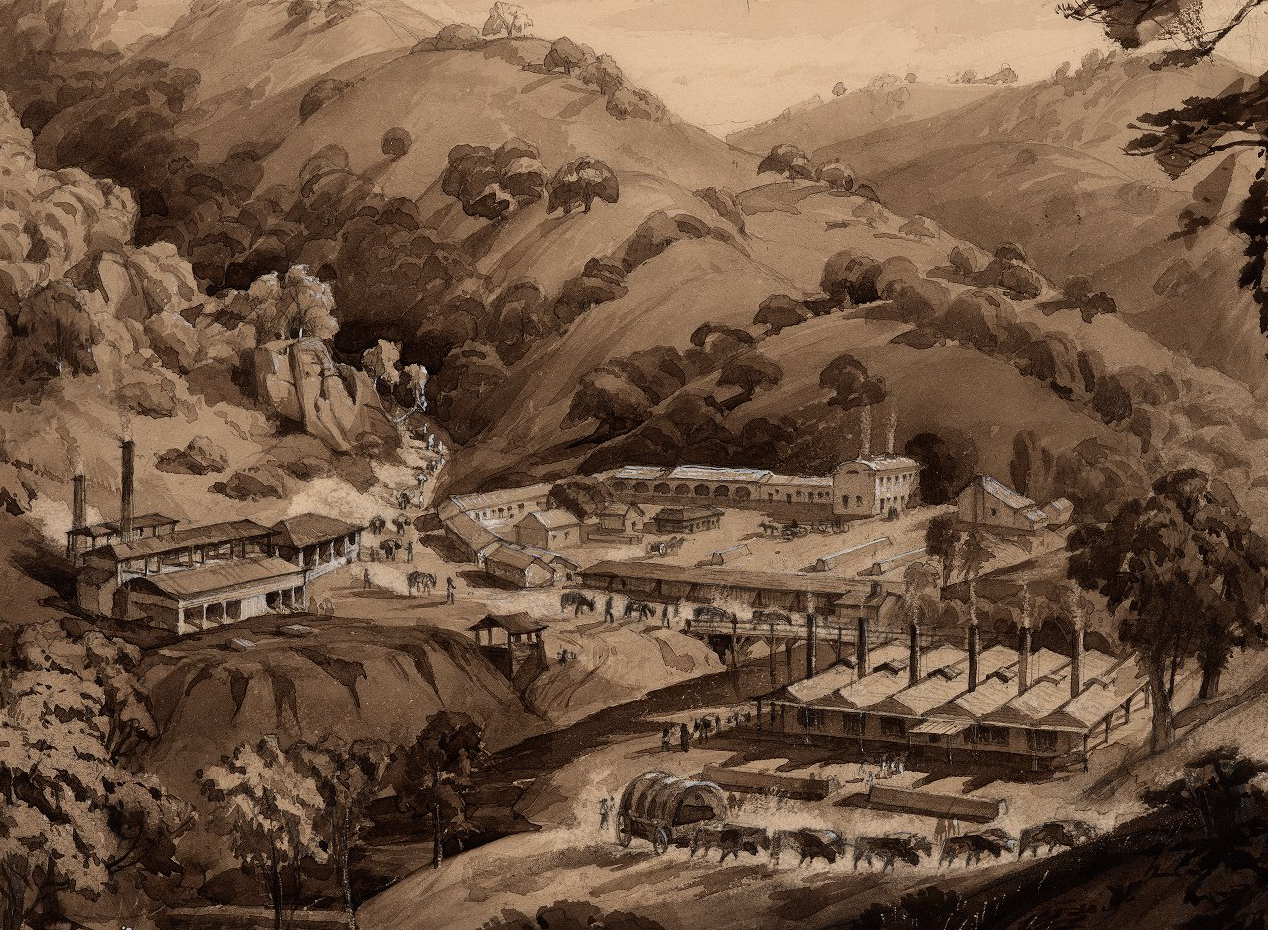
The Hacienda de Beneficio in New Almaden, shown in 1852

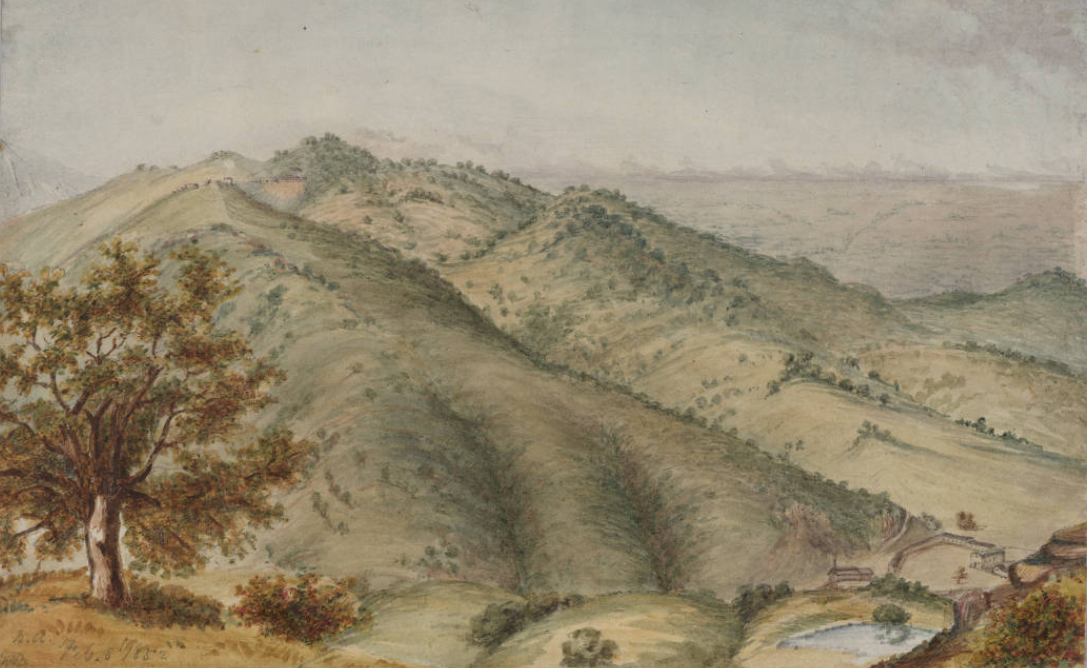
View of Almaden Valley (William Rich Hutton, c. 1847–1852)

Almaden Valley's origins go back to the early 1800s in what is now its southernmost neighborhood, known as New Almaden (Spanish: Nuevo Almadén). In the 1820s, there were several attempts by local Californio officials from the Pueblo of San José to mine the area for silver, including an 1824 venture led by Don Antonio Suñol, a prominent local figure, and Luis Chaboya, of Rancho Yerba Buena.

Quicksilver (mercury) was only successfully identified in 1845, by Mexican cavalry captain Andrés Castillero, who was able to obtain a grant to mine the area by Governor Pío Pico. However, occupied with his military responsibilities, Castillero sold his claim to the mines to Alexander Forbes, then serving as the British Consul to Mexican California. The area was named after the ancient Spanish mining town of Almadén, where mercury has been mined since Roman times.

Mercury was extracted from the New Almaden mines from the time of the California Gold Rush until 1975. Many of the names in Almaden retain their mercury mine themes, such as Silver Lode Lane and Silver Mine Drive. Many places in Almaden still use the name Quicksilver.

=== Post-Conquest era ===
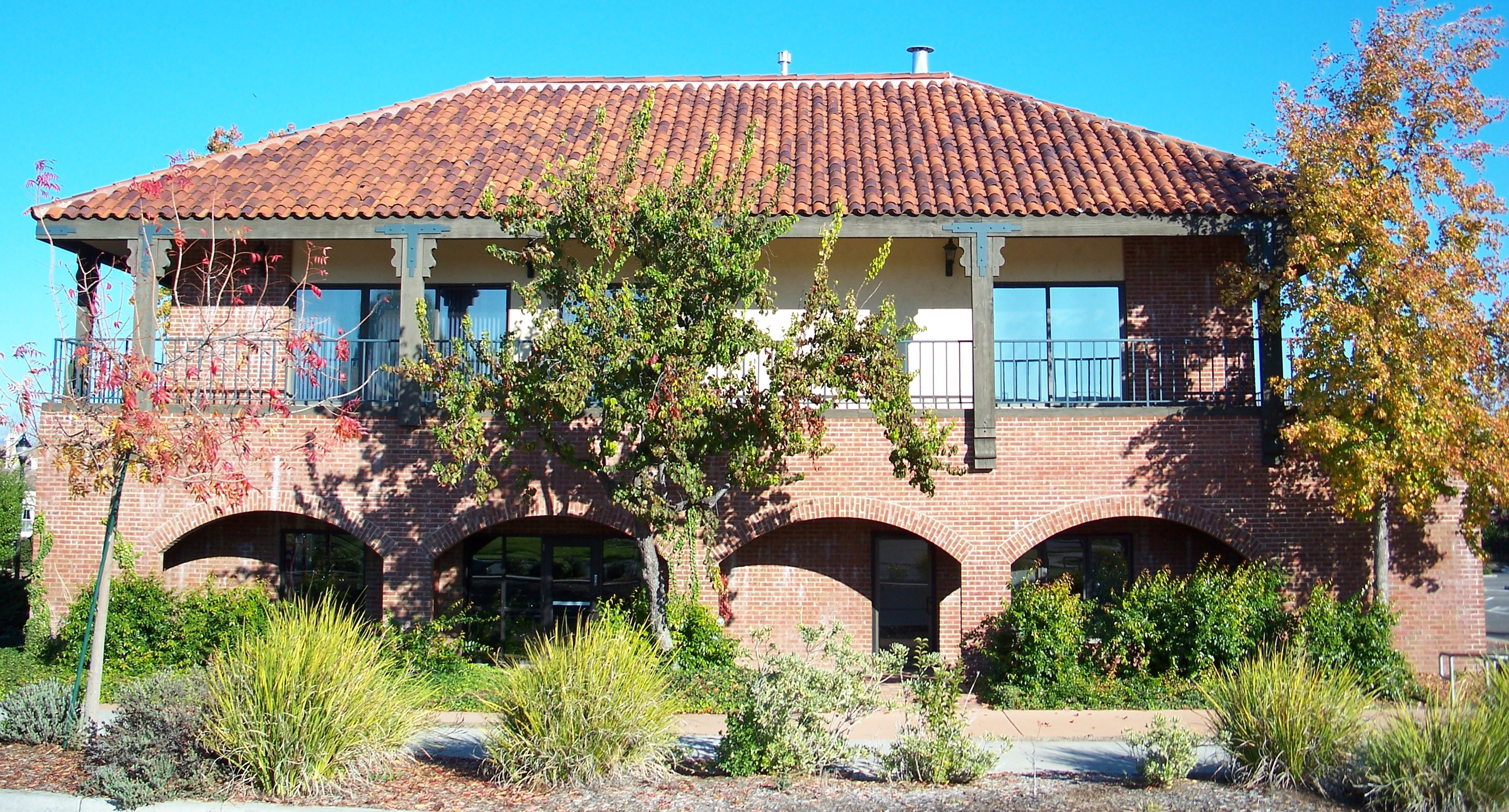
The Old Almaden Winery, founded in 1852, was the first commercial winery established in California.

Following the American Conquest of California, Almaden Valley attracted a significant amount of settlers from the East Coast and Europe.

In 1852, Charles LeFranc founded Almaden Vineyards, the first commercial winery in California, with his father-in-law Éthienne Thée, using vine cuttings from his native France. Following Prohibition, the winery and the company had great success with their blush wine and the White Grenache Rosé, one of the first popular pink wines in the United States. Almaden Vineyards has since moved its winery to Madera, California, while the historic remains of the property are now known as the Old Almaden Winery, which serves as a public park and California Historic Landmark.

Beginning in the late 1800s, Almaden was home to the Graystone Quarry (originally the Goodrich Quarry), one of the most significant quarries in the Bay Area, used in the construction of landmarks including San Francisco City Hall, Stanford University, Cathedral Basilica of St. Joseph, among numerous others. Today, the area where Graystone Quarry once existed and where the Pfeiffer family once lived is occupied by the neighborhood of Pfeiffer, also known as the Graystone of Almaden, thus named after the quarry's stone master Jacob Pfeiffer and the Quarry.

=== 20th century ===
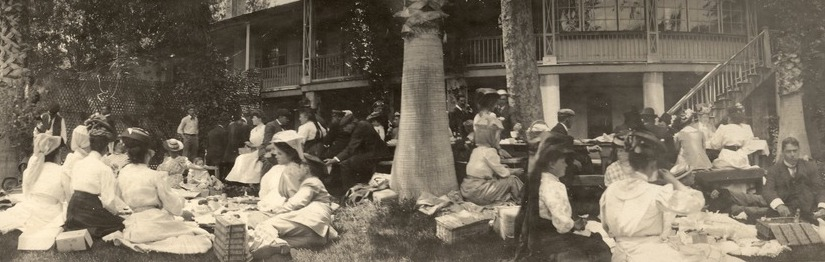
A community picnic in 1908 at the Casa Grande in the New Almaden neighborhood of Almaden Valley

In December 1959, the Regents of the University of California selected Almaden Valley to be the site of the next campus of the University of California system. Unfortunately, news of this decision caused property values in the area to increase so rapidly that the Regents could no longer afford to buy the needed land. After another year of study, the Regents selected another site much farther south, which opened in 1965 as the University of California, Santa Cruz.

In 1968, Calero County Park was established around Calero Lake in the Calero area of southern Almaden. Calero Lake was created in 1935, when Arroyo Calero was dammed.

In 1975, the New Almaden mines closed after 135 years of operation. Santa Clara County Parks subsequently purchased the vast property surrounding the mines, in order to transform it into a regional park. Almaden Quicksilver County Park opened a few years later after an extensive cleanup of the area. It was declared a National Historic Landmark and a California Historical Landmark.

== Geography ==
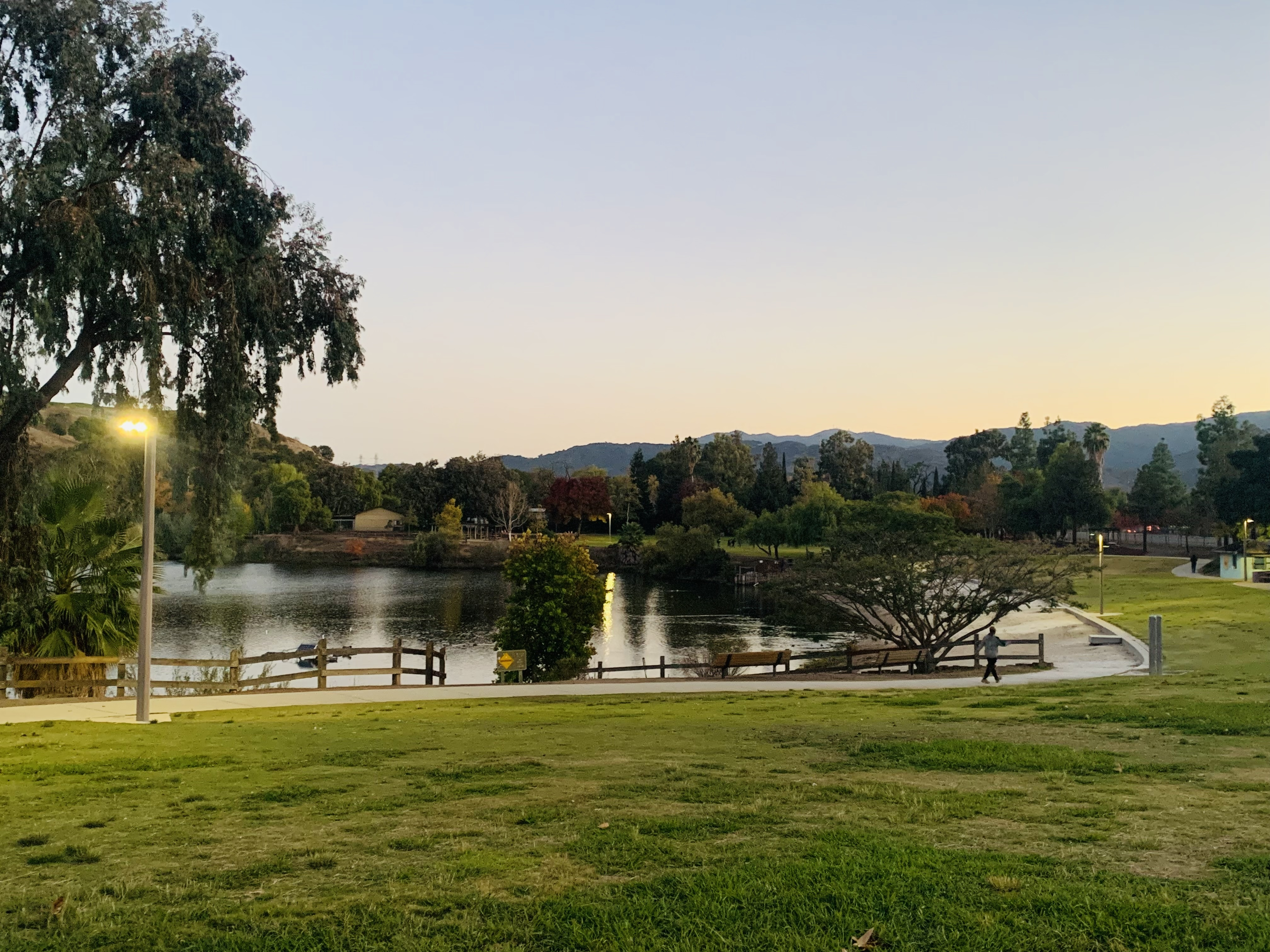
Almaden Lake Park

The neighborhood is southeast of Los Gatos, southwest of the Blossom Valley, south of Willow Glen in West San Jose and west of Santa Teresa.

The Santa Teresa Hills are to Almaden's east, separating it from Santa Teresa, and the Capitancillos Hills of the Sierra Azul are to Almaden's west and south.

Mount Umunhum, in the Sierra Azul, is the former site of the Almaden Air Force Station.

Almaden Valley includes all the areas within the 95120 ZIP code, comprising the neighborhoods Almaden Country Club, Calero, Almaden Hills Estates, Almaden Meadows, Graystone, New Almaden, Pfeiffer Ranch, Shadow Brook and several more.

== Parks ==
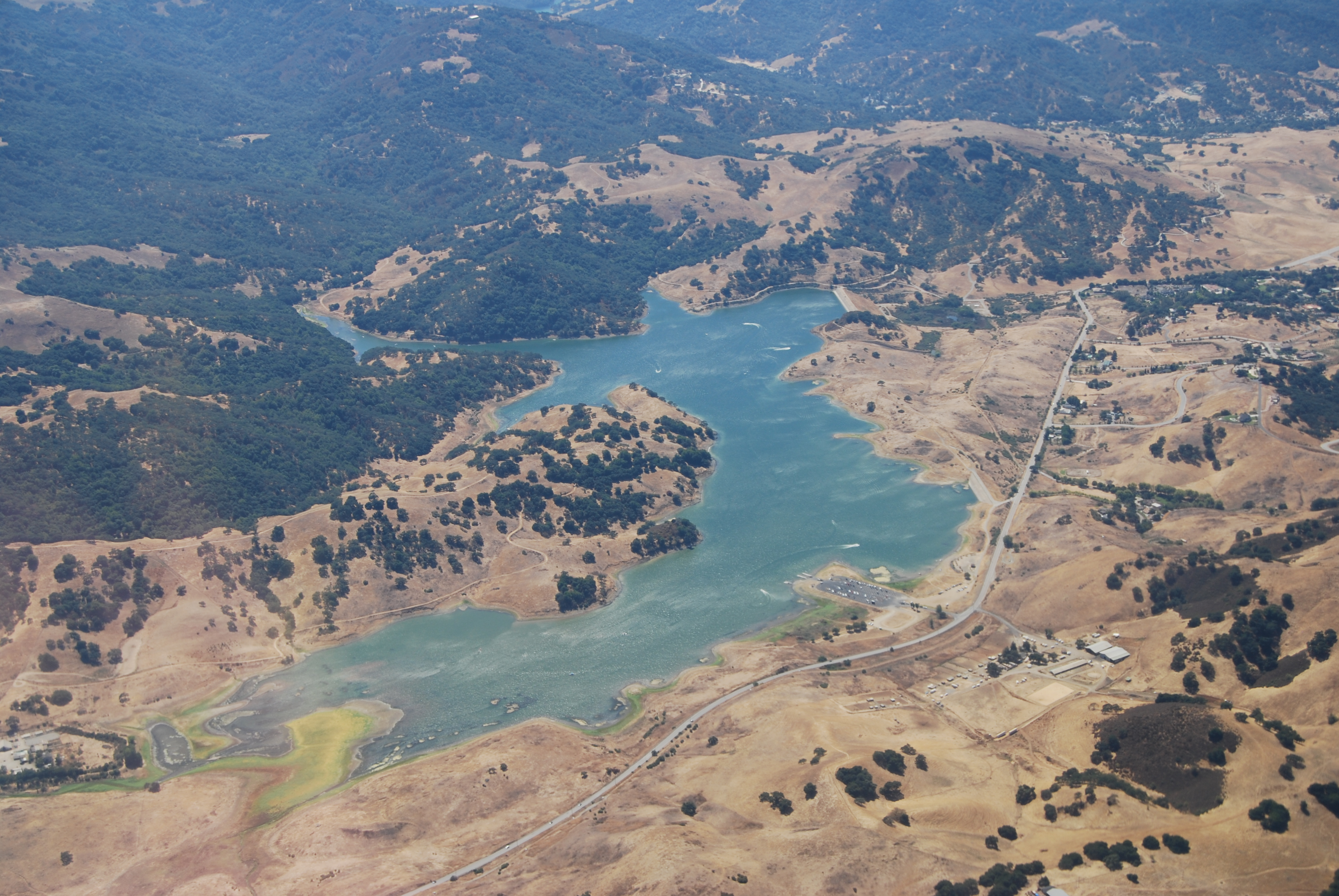
View of the Calero neighborhood of Almaden Valley. In the center is Calero Lake and Calero County Park.

Almaden Valley is home to 16 parks, including 3 county parks, 3 lakes, 1 regional park, 1 open space preserve and several neighborhood parks:

- Almaden Lake Regional Park
- Almaden Meadows Park
- Almaden Quicksilver County Park
- Almaden Reservoir
- Calero Lake and County Park
- Carabelle Park
- Cathedral Park
- Glenview Park
- Greystone Park
- Guadalupe Oak Grove Park
- Guadalupe Reservoir County Park
- Jeffrey Fontana Park
- Parma Park
- Rancho San Vicente Open Space Preserve
- Singer Park
- T J Martin Park

== Trails ==
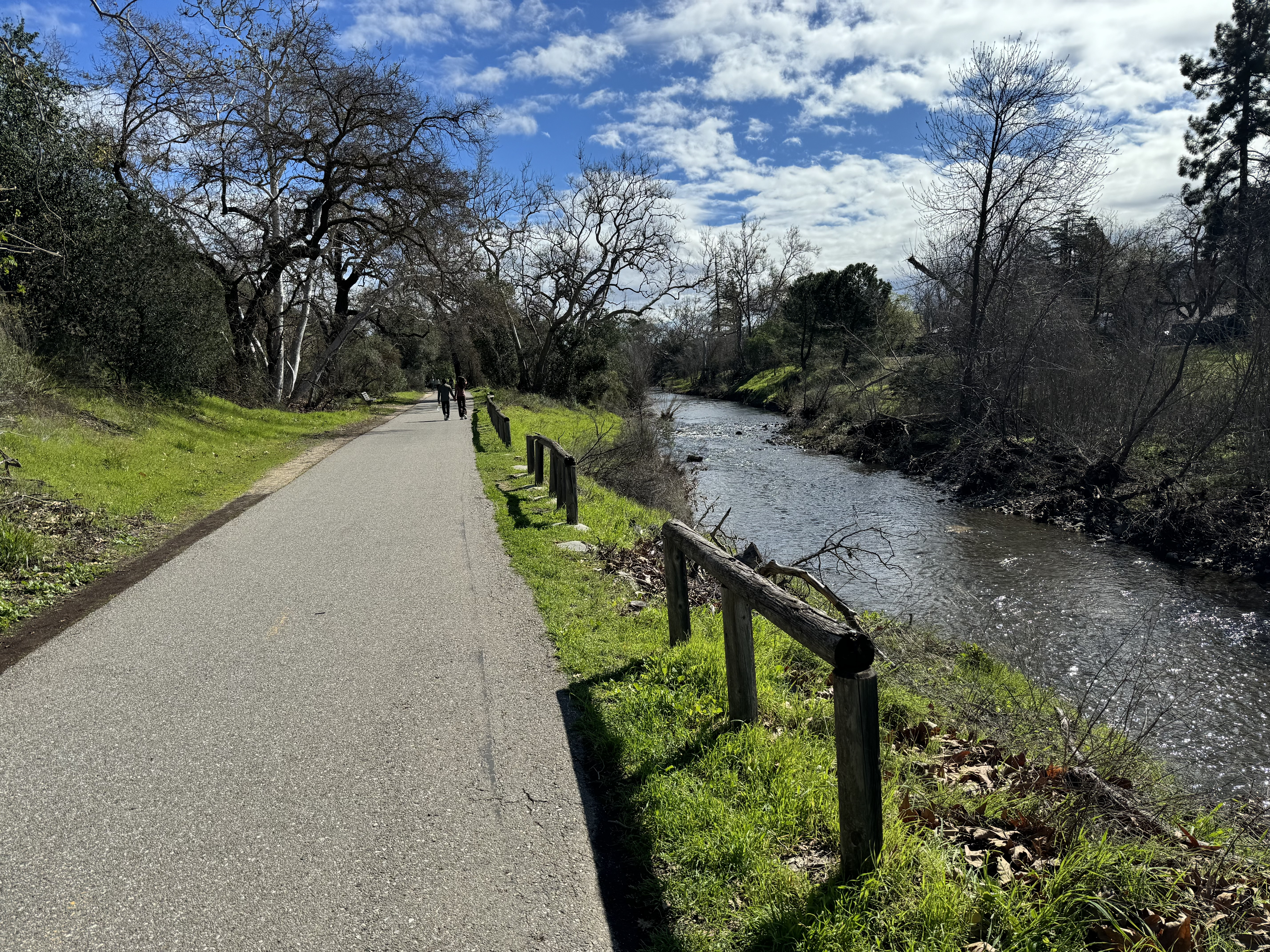
Los Alamitos Creek Trail passes through most of Almaden Valley, starting at the Almaden Lake and ending close to the Almaden Quicksilver County Park

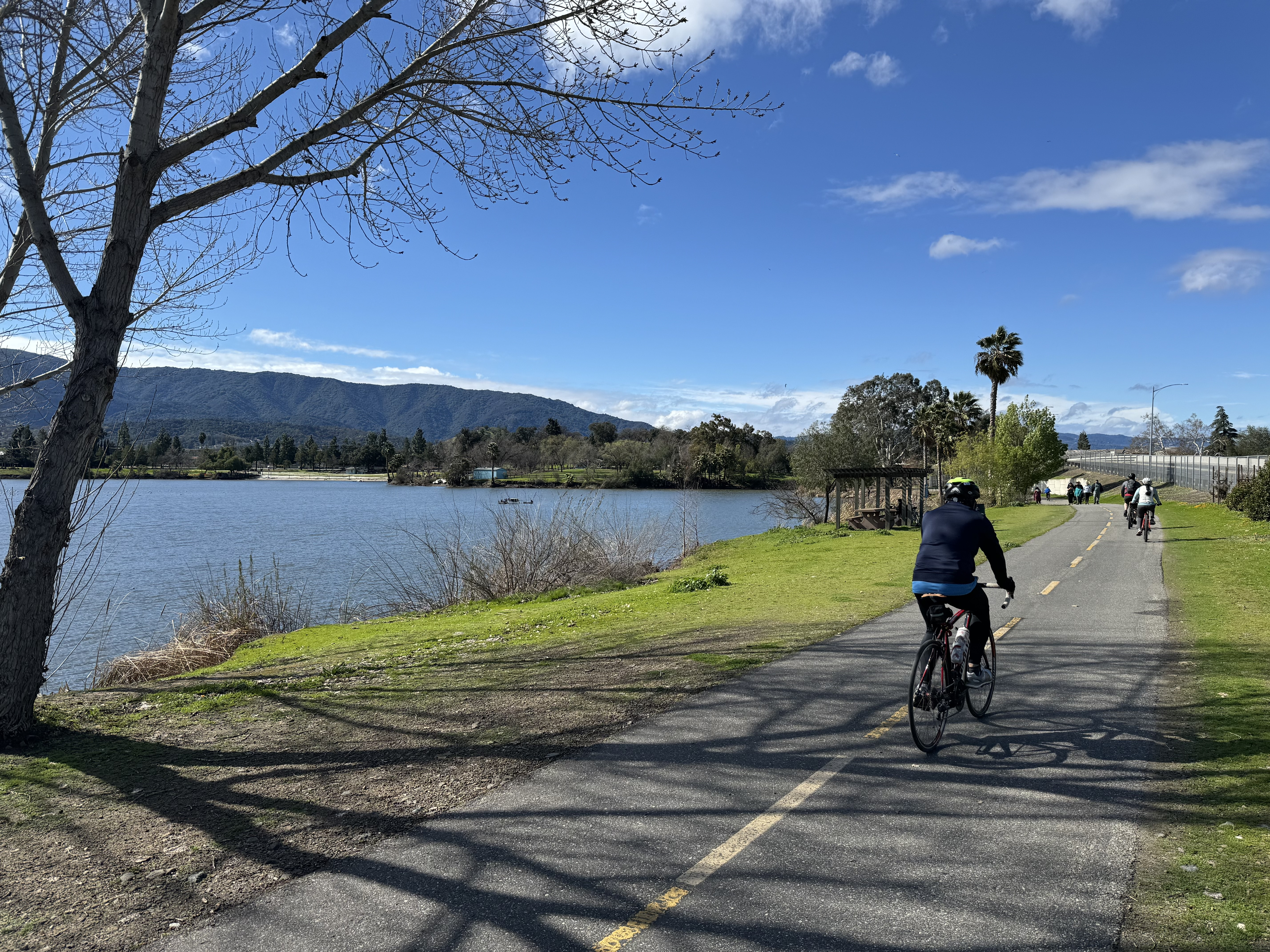
Almaden Lake Loop Trail

Almaden Valley is home to an expansive trail system, including:

- Los Alamitos Creek Trail is a 9.4-mile out-and-back trail
- Almaden Lake Loop Trail, a 1.4-mile trail
- Almaden Quicksilver County Park, 4163 acres with several trails across the park
- Calero Creek Trail and Mine Trail, 18 miles of unpaved hiking trails
- Guadalupe Creek Trail, is a 1.7-mile trail
- Mount Umunhum trail, a 7.7 mile trail in the Sierra Azul Open Space Preserve to the summit of the mountain
- Senador Mine Trail, Mine Hill Trail, and Castillero Trail, a 12.7 mile trail
- Webb Canyon, New Almaden, Cinnabar, Mine Hill, Randol and Prospect #3 Loop Trail, a 5.4-mile trail
- New Almaden, Mine Hill and Guadalupe Trail Loop, a 13.6-mile loop trail

Also notably, Bay Area Ridge Trail, the 550-mile hiking, cycling, and equestrian trail being built on the ridgelines around all of San Francisco Bay Area includes Almaden Valley's Los Alamitos Creek Trail, Calero Creek Trail, Mount Umunhum Trail and Almaden Quicksilver County Park.

== Economy ==
Integral to Silicon Valley, Almaden is home to numerous high tech companies. It is notably home to the IBM Almaden Research Center, which played an important role in the discovery and development of new technologies.

== Government ==
Almaden Valley is part of District 10 in the legislative structure of the San Jose City Council and is represented by councilmember George Casey, who earlier worked in a major law firm, at a startup as a counsel and as a Planning Commissioner. George Casey is a graduate of Bay Area institutions such as Bellarmine College Preparatory, the distinguished UC Berkeley, and Santa Clara University.

Prior to this, Almaden Valley and District 10 were represented by Silicon Valley technology executive Arjun Batra., the first Indian-American councilmember for Almaden Valley and District 10, and the first for San Jose since Ash Kalra left in 2016 to serve as the first Indian-American in the California State Legislature.

Notably, Matt Mahan was also the councilmember representing Almaden Valley and District 10, before being elected as the current Mayor of San Jose.

== Demographics ==
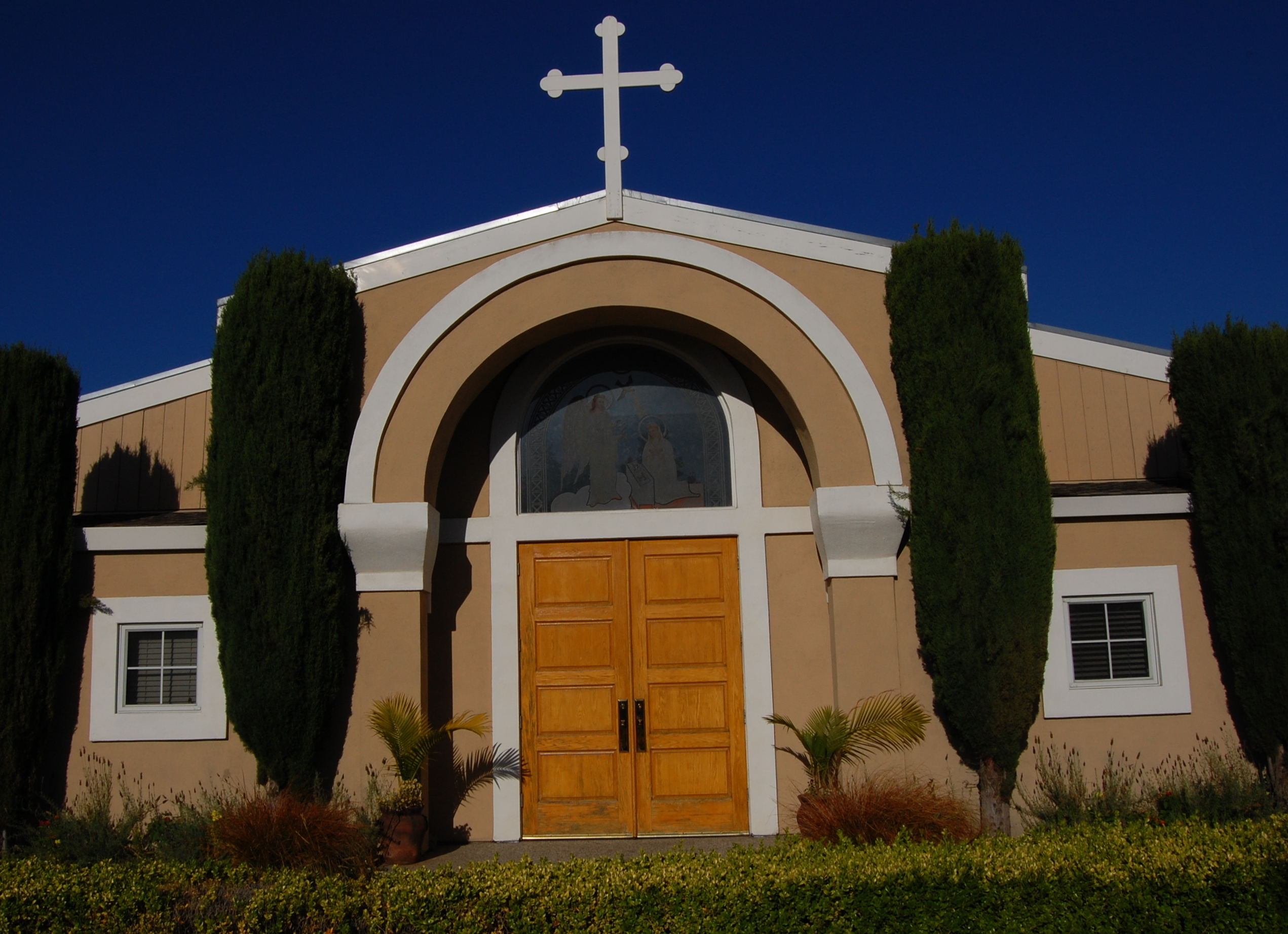
Saint Basil the Great Church

The neighborhood is primarily an affluent residential area. The average income per household in Almaden Valley is $297,716

The 2010 United States census and the American Community Survey (ACS) conducted by the U.S. Census Bureau reported that, as of 2019, Almaden Valley had a population of 38,122, with 12,877 housing units.

The racial makeup of Almaden Valley was 20,726 (54.4%) White, 13,866 (36.4%) Asian, 2,700 (7.1%) Hispanic or Latino, 741 (1.9%) African American, 124 (0.3%) Native American, 2184 (5.7%) from two or more races and 442 (1.2%) of some other race.

The population was spread out, with 9430 (24.7%) children under the age of 18, 21,243 (55.7%) adults aged 18 to 64, and 7,449 (19.5%) adults aged 65 years or older. The median age was 46.3 years. For every 100 females, there were 98.5 males. For every 100 females age 18 and over, there were 96.4 males.

== Education ==
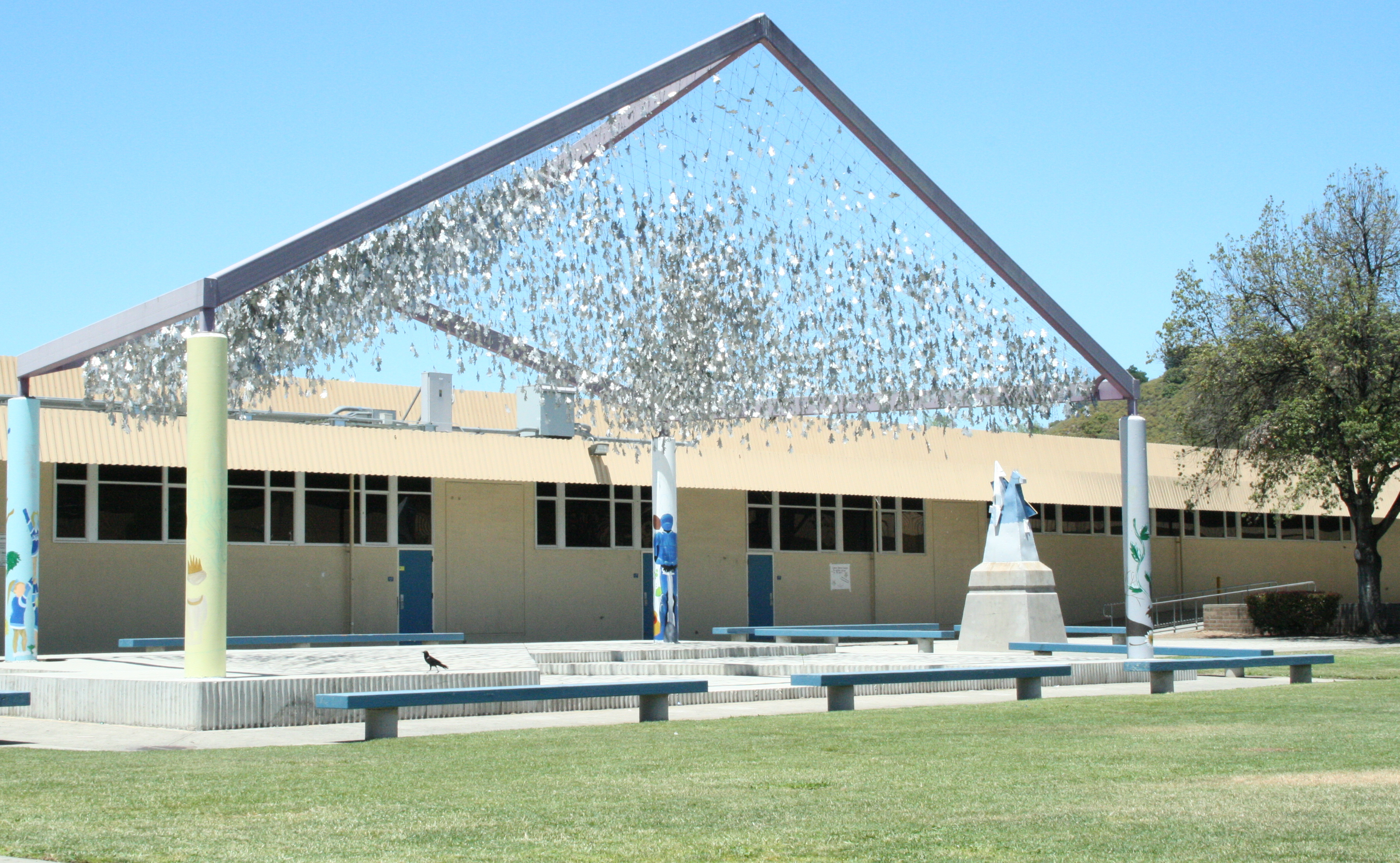
Leland High School

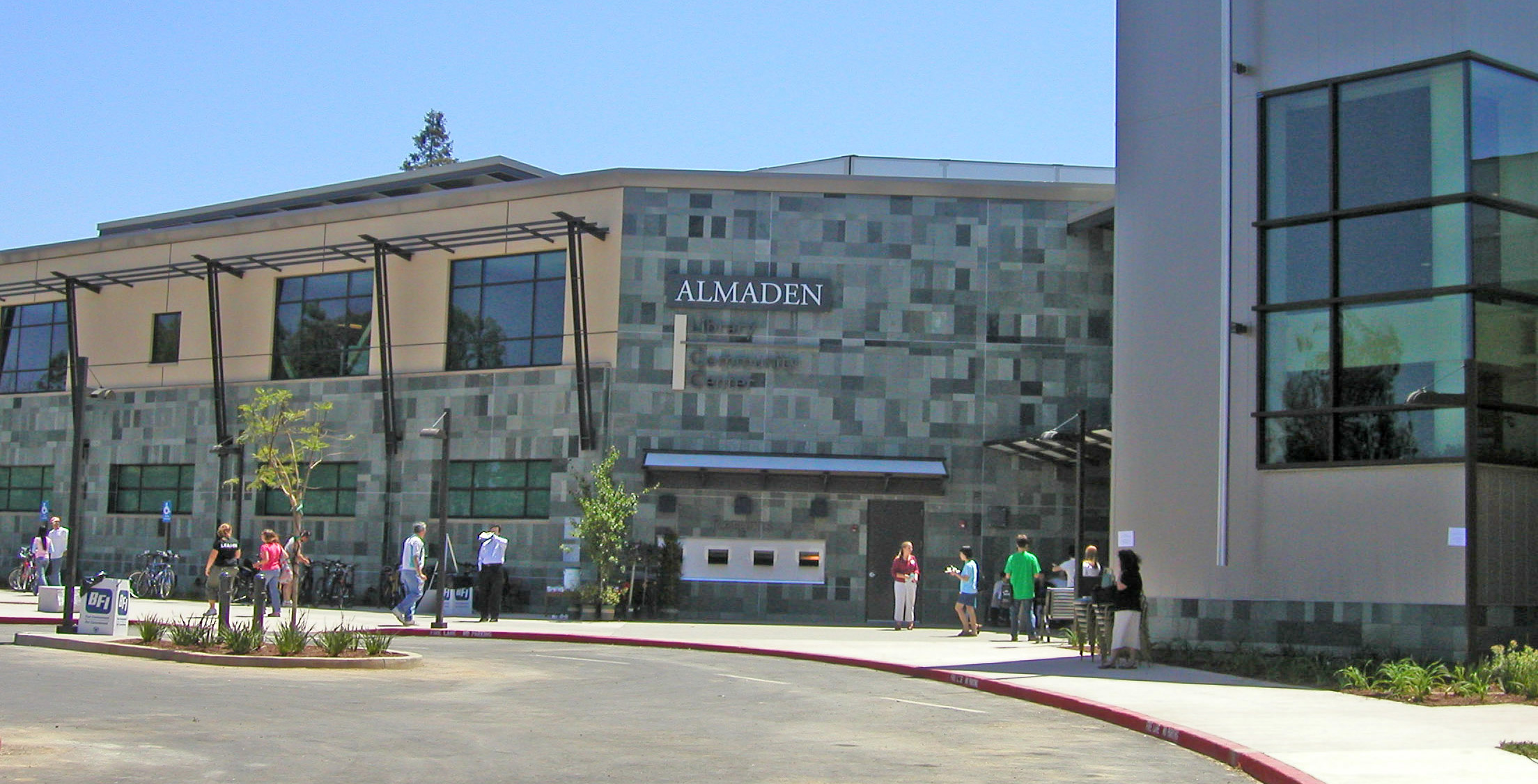
Almaden Branch Library of the San José Public Library

Almaden Valley students attend primary, middle and high schools across three different school districts: San José Unified School District, Campbell Union School District and Los Gatos Union School District. While most neighborhoods are in San José Unified School District, some in the northwest are in the Campbell Union School District, and some in the southwest bordering Los Gatos are in the Los Gatos Union School District.

Almaden Valley is served by the Almaden Branch Library of the San José Public Library.

Schools in Almaden include:

Public schools

- Leland High School
- Pioneer High School
- Bret Harte Middle School
- Castillero Middle School
- Greystone Elementary School
- Guadalupe Elementary School
- Los Alamitos Elementary School
- Simonds Elementary School
- Williams Elementary School

Private schools

- Almaden Country Day School
- Challenger School
- Holy Spirit Catholic School
- Stratford School

== Culture ==
Almaden is home to numerous annual cultural events, including the Almaden Art & Wine Festival, the Almaden Harvest Festival, and the San Jose Water Lantern Festival.

Sporting events held in the area include the Quicksilver Endurance Runs and the Quicksilver Trail Challenge.

== Landmarks ==
=== Casa Grande ===
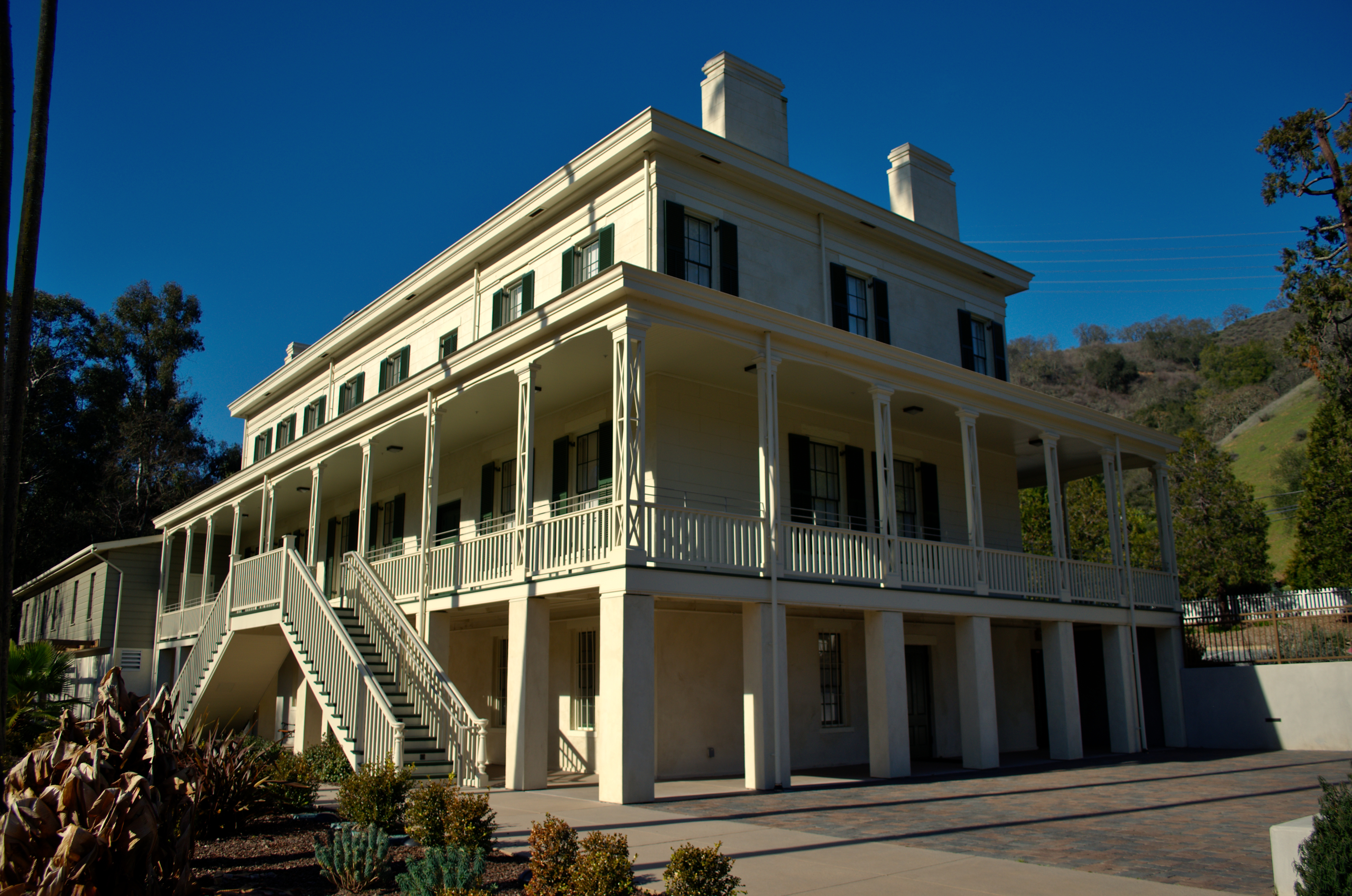
Casa Grande, home of the New Almaden Quicksilver Mining Museum

Casa Grande was constructed in 1854, under the direction of the mine's general manager, Henry Halleck, who used the building until 1920 as a personal and official residence for the New Almaden Mining Company. John McLaren, of Golden Gate Park fame, assisted in designing the five acres of formally landscaped grounds around the house.

In 1997, Santa Clara County purchased the building to house the Almaden Quicksilver Mining Museum, which started as a private collection by Constance Perham, who displayed it in her house in New Almaden. The new museum opened in 1998. The building underwent extensive renovation from 2009 to 2010 to restore it to its configuration when it was a mine manager's residence from 1854 to 1925. It reopened in January 2011. It houses interpretive exhibits and displays on the history of the New Almaden mines and on the lives of its workers and their families.

=== Hacienda Hotel ===
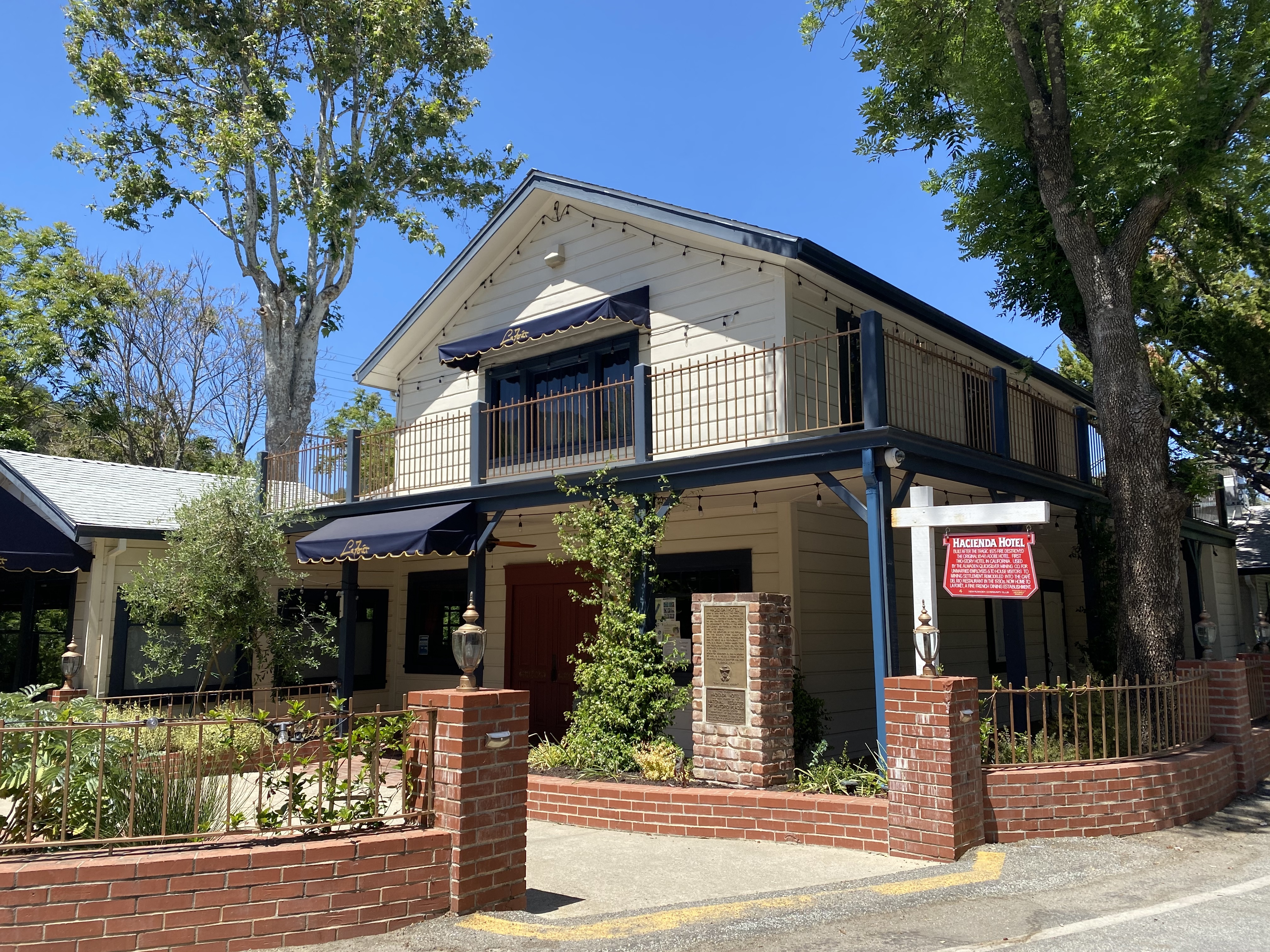
The historic Hacienda Hotel, now home to La Forêt, one of San Jose's most famous French restaurants

In the mid-1800s, just a few years before the great California Gold Rush, Andrés Castillera, a Mexican officer with the Artillery discovered cinnabar in New Almaden, a precious metal also known as quicksilver which bought Castillera lot of riches. As the word spread, New Almaden was thriving with miners trying to mine more cinnabar themselves.

In 1848, a boarding house was constructed by the creek in New Almaden as a house for boarding for the miners. Hot meals were served in the rustic dining room downstairs. This was the first two-story lodging in California. Fire destroyed the building in 1875 but it was rebuilt and stayed in operation in this capacity until the 1930s.

It was then converted into Cafe Del Rio which served New Almaden for almost 40 years.

In 1992, La Foret, a high-end French restaurant opened in the building. The restaurant, still in operation, is a local landmark in San Jose and well known across the Bay Area for its fine dining.

=== New Almaden Historic District ===
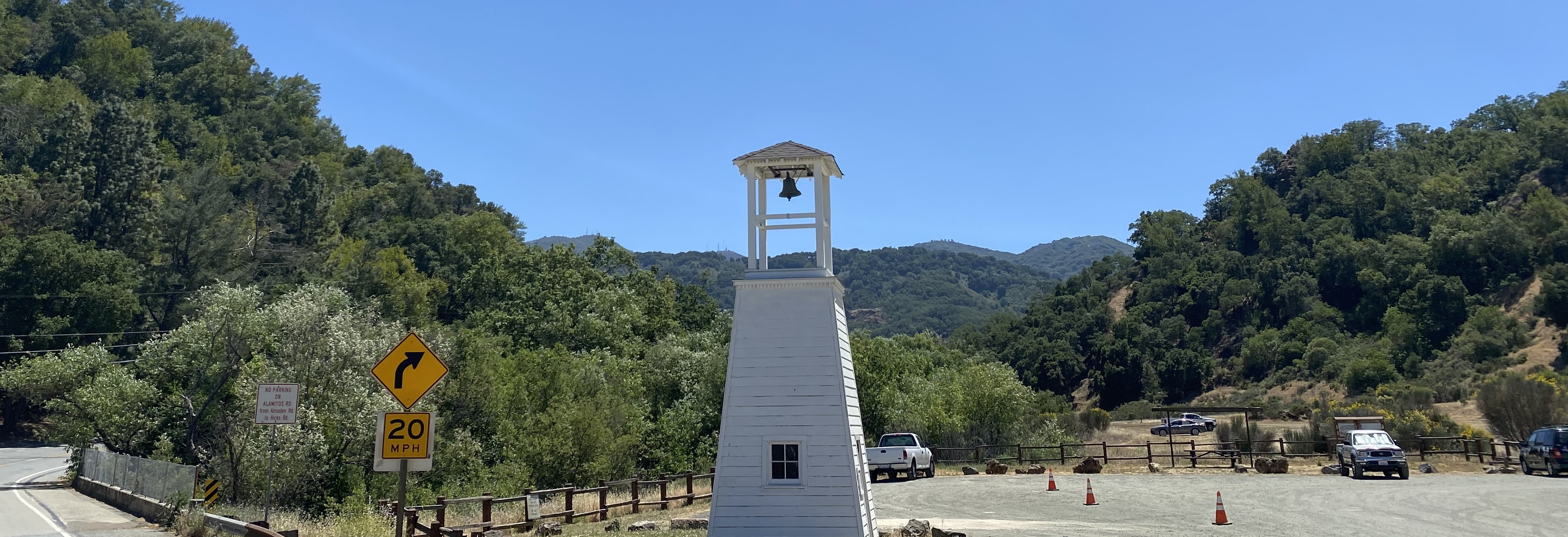
Old Watchtower of New Almaden

A two-teacher school was built in the 1860s on a flat near Casa Grande. Enrollment came chiefly from the Hacienda along with some children from nearby ranches. One of the oldest buildings in the district is the Carson-Perham Adobe, built between 1848 and 1850 by Mexican miners, and later the home of George Carson, the mine company bookkeeper, postmaster, telegraph operator, and Wells Fargo agent. Constance Perham lived in the adobe house for many years and established a private museum there in 1949, the collections of which were purchased in 1983 by Santa Clara County.

== Transportation ==
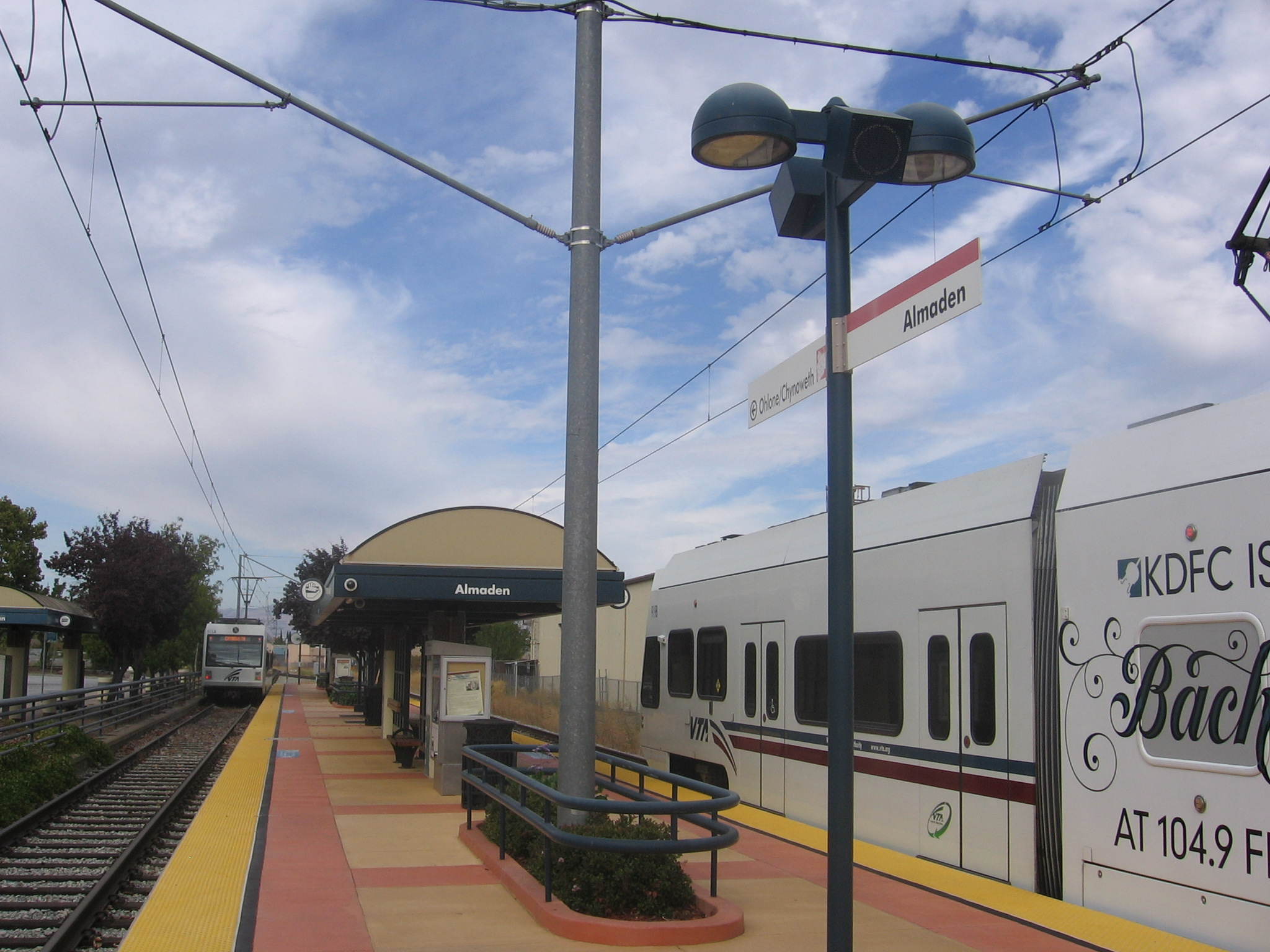
Almaden station of the VTA light rail

=== Roads ===
Almaden Expressway is the primary arterial road that intersects through Almaden Valley, linking it to the rest of Santa Clara Valley with connections to the West Valley Freeway (CA 85) and the Guadalupe Freeway (CA 87)

Blossom Hill Road, an important artery for South San Jose and Los Gatos also passes through Almaden.

=== Rail ===
Until 2019, Almaden station of the VTA light rail was the main rail connection in the area. Since its closure, the closest VTA light rail station is Ohlone/Chynoweth station on the Blue Line.

== Media ==
- The Almaden Times is a weekly newspaper, owned by Times Media, and has been serving Almaden Valley since 1986.
- The Almaden Resident is a weekly newspaper, owned by Metro Newspapers, and has been serving Almaden Valley since 2004.

== In popular culture ==
- Angle of Repose, a 1971 novel that won the Pulitzer Prize for Fiction in 1972, had New Almaden as one of the key locations the story was set in
- Aparajita Tumi, a 2012 Indian Bengali-language drama film set in Almaden Valley, directed by Aniruddha Roy Chowdhury, an adaptation of the novel Dui Nari Hathe Tarbari by famous Bengali writer Sunil Gangopadhyay. The movie won several awards at the Indian Royal Stag Mirchi Music Awards.
- The Tillman Story, a 2010 documentary on the life of Pat Tillman, who grew up in Almaden Valley, a defensive back with the Arizona Cardinals. Tillman decided to walk away from a multimillion-dollar contract to go to Afghanistan in 2002, where he was killed. The documentary was nominated for the Grand Jury Prize at the 2010 Sundance Film Festival. It was named 2010 Best Documentary by the San Francisco Film Critics Circle, the St. Louis Gateway Film Critics Association, and the Florida Film Critics Circle.

== Notable residents ==
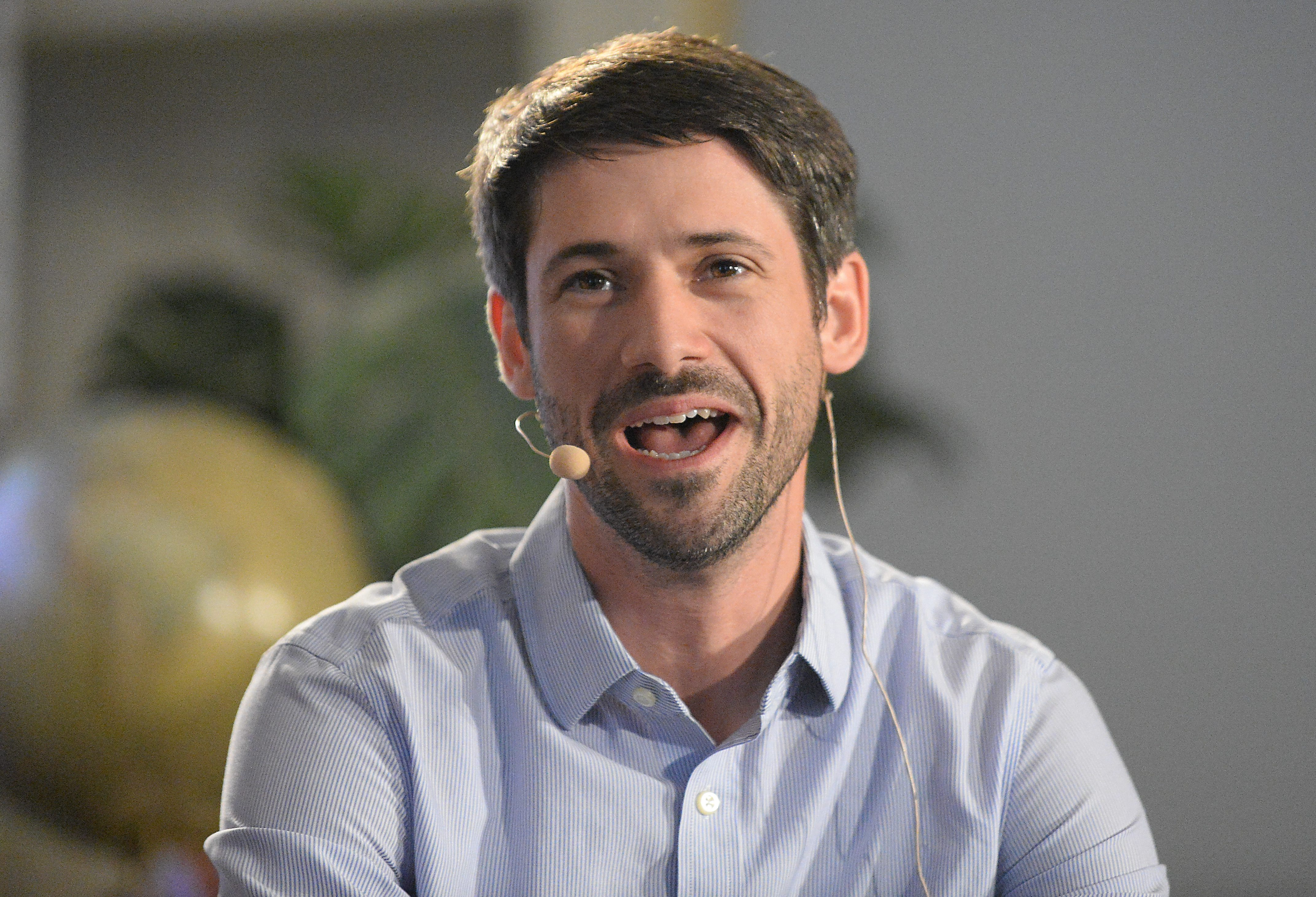
Matt Mahan, Mayor of San Jose, tech entrepreneur, co-founder and former CEO of Brigade Media

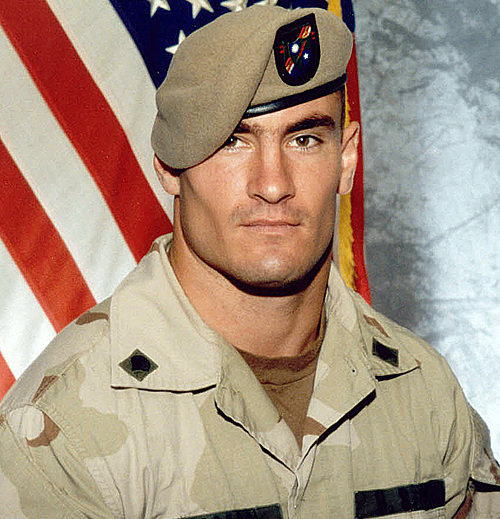
Pat Tillman, NFL player, Army Ranger, and Purple Heart recipient

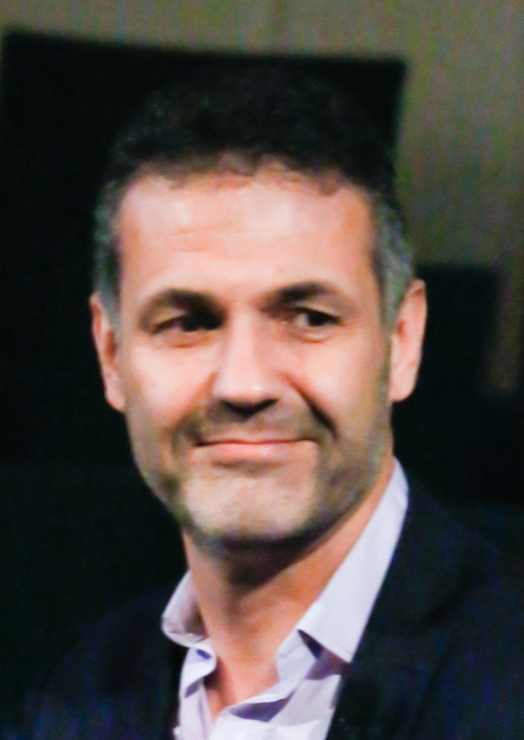
Khaled Hosseini, Novelist and author of New York Times best seller The Kite Runner, goodwill ambassador for United Nations High Commissioner for Refugees and former physician

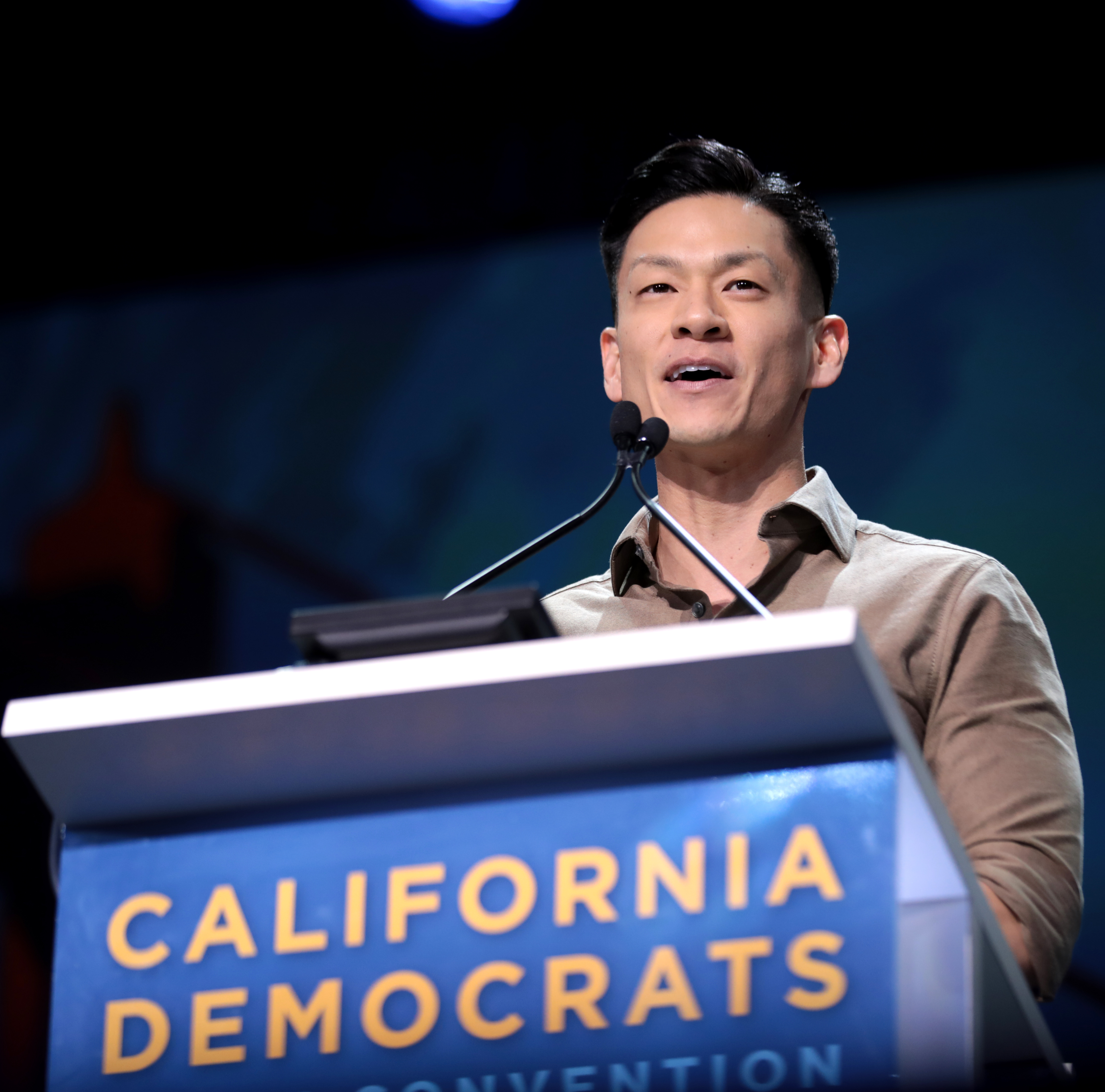
Evan Low, a California State Assemblyman and former Mayor of Campbell

Following are some of the notable past or present residents of the Almaden Valley:

- Alan Chang — Pianist and songwriter.
- Brent Jones – Former American football player and Pro Bowl tight end for the San Francisco 49ers.
- Count Five — 1960s rock band.
- Dave Hoffmann - Professional football player and All-American college football player for the Washington Huskies
- Dave Righetti — Professional baseball player and coach.
- David E. Osborne — Author, Reinventing Government and The Coming. Senior White House advisor, Clinton administration. 2018 Spur Award Winner, Historical Novel.
- Evan Low – California State Assembly member, and former Mayor of Campbell, California.
- Jason Hardtke – Former professional baseball player
- Jerry Hsu – Professional skateboarder.
- Joe Murray – Creator of TV animated series Rocko's Modern Life and Camp Lazlo.
- Kevin Pollak — Actor, impressionist, game show host, and comedian.
- Kim Yubin – Singer, actress, and former member of Wonder Girls
- Khaled Hosseini – Afghan-American novelist, United Nations High Commissioner for Refugees goodwill ambassador, former physician and author of New York Times bestselling book The Kite Runner, on which the award winning The Kite Runner (movie) was made
- Matt Mahan - Mayor of City of San Jose (2023-)
- Pat Tillman – Former American football player, notable for turning down a multimillion-dollar contract and enlisting as a United States Army Ranger in response to the September 11, 2001 attacks. He was killed in Afghanistan in 2004 by friendly fire. The football/track stadium at Almaden Valley's Leland High School is named Tillman Stadium after him.
- Reggie Smith – Former NBA player for the Portland Trail Blazers.
- Rob Becker — Playwright, Defending the Caveman.
- Steven Beitashour – Major League Soccer player, formerly with the San Jose Earthquakes.
- Steve Finn — Philanthropist and former mayor of Los Altos Hills.
- Steve Smith – Astronaut, holds all-time second place for cumulative spacewalk time.
