= Almaden =

Almaden may refer to:

== Places ==
=== United States ===
- Almaden Valley, San Jose, California
  - Almaden Mine, an alternate name for New Almaden Quicksilver Mine
  - IBM Almaden Research Center, San Jose
  - Almaden Air Force Station, a former US Air Force station
  - Almaden station, a light rail station in San Jose
- Old Almaden Winery, a park in Santa Clara County, California

=== Other places ===
- Almaden, Queensland, Australia
- Almadén, a town in Spain notable for its mercury mines

== Other uses ==
- Almaden Vineyards, a wine producer owned by Constellation Brands
