= Almaden Times =

Coordinates: 37.261514°N 121.923727°W

Almaden Times Weekly
- Type: Bi-monthly newspaper
- Owner(s): Times Media, Inc.
- Publisher: William Bellou
- Founded: 1986
- Headquarters: 1900 Camden Avenue; San Jose, CA 95124
- Country: United States
- Circulation: 14,500 (as of 1991)
- OCLC number: 39759017
- Website: timesmedia.pageflip.site/publications/AlmadenTimes

The Almaden Times is a community newspaper that serves Almaden Valley, California, and the surrounding south Santa Clara County, California. It is owned by Times Media, Inc., which also publishes the Evergreen Times and the Willow Glen Times. The current publisher of the Almaden Times is William Bellou. The monthly circulation of the Almaden Times is 14,500. Archived digital copies of the Almaden Times are available online.

== History ==
Publication of the Almaden Times began in 1986.

In 2004, the weekly Almaden Resident began competing with the Almaden Times in the South San Jose region.

== Awards ==
In 2013, the Almaden Times and other community papers published by Times Media Inc. received a commendation from San Jose's mayor Reed for 30 years of dedicated community coverage.
