= Leland High School (San Jose, California) =

Public high school in San Jose, California, United States

Location
- 6677 Camden Ave; San Jose, California 95120; United States; 37.217136°N 121.844326°W

Information
- Type: Public
- Established: 1967
- School district: San Jose Unified School District
- Principal: Harveen Bal
- Teaching staff: 57.02 (on FTE basis)
- Grades: 9, 10, 11, 12
- Enrollment: 1,519 (2023–2024)
- Student to teacher ratio: 26.64
- Colors: Navy blue, Columbia blue, Gold
- Mascot: Chargers
- Rival: Pioneer High School
- Website: leland.sjusd.org

Leland High School is a public high school located in the Almaden Valley in San Jose, California. Established in 1967, Leland is one of the nine high schools in the San Jose Unified School District.

== History ==
Leland was founded in 1967. It was named for Raymond B. Leland, who had served as principal of San Jose High School, and his son Gordon Leland, who had been a student at the school and had died in World War II.

== Awards and recognition ==
Leland has won accolades for its speech and debate team, and more recently its FIRST Robotics Competition Quixilver 604 and its FIRST Tech Challenge Quixilver 8404 robotics teams.

In 2021, U.S. News & World Report ranked Leland as the number 1 high school in San Jose Unified School District and number 68 in the state of California, and the education ranking and review website Niche ranked the school as the number 1 high school in the district and number 77 in the state.

In 2014, Leland was ranked number 20 in the United States for high standardized test scores between 2012-2014. Newsweek ranked Leland High School 54th in the nation.

During the 2004–05 school year, Leland High School was recognized with the Blue Ribbon School Award of Excellence by the United States Department of Education, the highest award an American school can receive.

== Notable alumni and staff ==
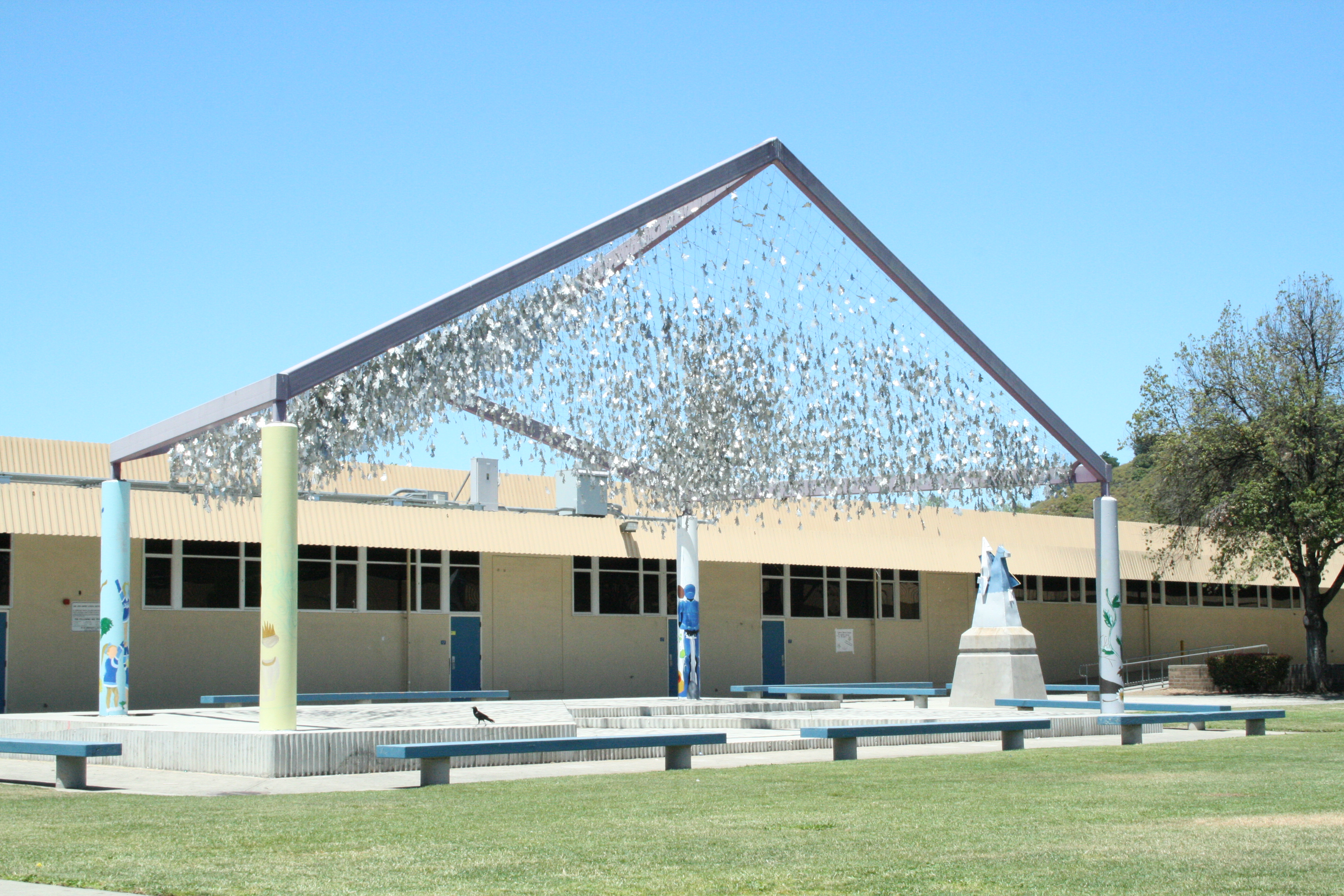
The Leland High School Quad.

- Steven Beitashour '05 – Major League Soccer player, formerly with the San Jose Earthquakes.
- Jenna Flynn ‘22 - Water polo player, competed at 2024 Olympic Games for United States
- Jason Hardtke – Former professional baseball player
- Jerry Hsu – Professional skateboarder.
- Brent Jones '81 – Former American football player and Pro Bowl tight end for the San Francisco 49ers.
- Evan Low '01 – California State Assembly member, and former Mayor of Campbell, California.
- Joe Murray – Creator of TV animated series Rocko's Modern Life and Camp Lazlo.
- Reggie Smith '88 – Former NBA player for the Portland Trail Blazers.
- Steve Smith '77 – astronaut
- Pat Tillman '94 – Former American football player, ended football career to enlist as a United States Army Ranger, killed in War in Afghanistan, namesake for football stadium.
