= Pioneer High School (San Jose, California) =

Public secondary school in San Jose, California

Location
- 1290 Blossom Hill Road; San Jose, California 95118; United States; 37.2474°N 121.88289°W

Information
- Type: Public secondary
- Established: 1960
- Locale: San Jose Unified School District
- Principal: Tim Gavello
- Mission Statement: Opening minds Serving the community. Enriching lives.
- School Colors: Blue; White; Black (secondary)
- Teaching staff: 66.75 (FTE)
- Grades: 9-12
- Enrollment: 1,469 (2023–2024)
- Student to teacher ratio: 22.01
- Colors: Blue, White & Black
- Mascot: Mustangs
- Rival: Leland High School
- Feeder schools: Castillero Middle School; John Muir Middle School
- Website: pioneer.sjusd.org

Pioneer High School is a highly rated public high school located in the Almaden Valley neighborhood of San Jose, California. It is one of six high schools in the San Jose Unified School District, and is a science magnet school with an interdisciplinary focus on community service and service learning. It was nominated for California Distinguished School awards in 2008, 2006, 2000, and 1996.

In 2021, U.S. News & World Report ranked Pioneer as the number 2 high school in San Jose Unified School District and number 228 in the state of California, and the education ranking and review website Niche ranked the school as the number 2 high school in the district and number 343 in the state.

== Academics ==
Pioneer High School has received 4 California Distinguished School awards (1996, 2000, 2006, and 2008), has been awarded the Santa Clara County Top Ten High School award, and has been listed in The Mercury News as a National Service Learning Leader School from 1998 to 2006. The school's Academic Performance index in 2007 was 801/1000, putting it in the top 20% of schools and classifying it under the "Very High Performing School" category. Pioneer has never failed to achieve the growth goals expected of them under the No Child Left Behind Act.

At Pioneer High, each student has a certain amount of unit requirements under different categories that they must complete in order to graduate. There are a number of accelerated and Advanced Placement classes students can choose from, as well as mock trial and radio broadcasting extra-curricular activities that they can choose to be involved in. The yearbook was a semi-finalist in the year 2006, and in the 2006–2007 school year the yearbook was chosen as the national sample.

== Service Learning Focus ==
Pioneer High School focuses on community service and service learning as part of its mission statement. To support this focus, the school requires all sophomore students to participate in a "Sophomore Project", a venture that demands a minimum of 30 hours of community service related to a world problem, in addition to many class assignments relating to it, such as a poem and a poster board, in the span of a school year. 15 hours are required per semester of the sophomore year. In most cases, students exceed this amount, sometimes even exceeding one hundred hours, in which case they are presented the President's Volunteer Service Award.

During their Senior year, students are again allowed to participate in a service learning project when they are introduced to the "Senior Exhibition" assignment. Students may complete multiple hours of personal or community work in order to obtain extra credits. The Senior Exhibition project is not mandatory, but students who complete it are rewarded with a graduation cord.

== Athletics ==
A Pioneer football player running the ball (Steven Lopes).

Pioneer Mustangs Athletics are generally known for being a strong force within the BVAL league of the Central Coast Section. The Athletic Department, headed by Joe Berticevich, has experienced much success over the past decade. Perhaps the sports Pioneer is most known for are its football and basketball teams. Pioneer football has achieved multiple winning seasons in the Mount Hamilton division of BVAL over the past decade, and continually competes with private schools of a much higher caliber. The Mustangs biggest rivals are the Leland Chargers.

FALL SPORTS	WINTER SPORTS	SPRING SPORTS
Varsity Football	Boys Varsity Basketball	Varsity Baseball
JV Football	Boys JV Basketball	Frosh/Soph Baseball
Frosh/Soph Football	Girls Varsity Basketball	Varsity Softball
Girls Volleyball	Girls JV Basketball	JV Softball
JV Volleyball	Boys Varsity Soccer	Boys/Girls Badminton
Girls Tennis	Frosh/Soph Boys Soccer	Track and Field
Cross Country	Girls Varsity Soccer	Boys Tennis
Boys Varsity Water Polo	Girls JV Soccer	Boys/Girls Golf
Boys JV Water Polo	Wrestling	Boys/Girls Swimming
Girls Varsity Water Polo	Varsity Ice Hockey	Diving
Girls JV Water Polo	JV Ice Hockey	Boys Volleyball
		Boys/Girls La Crosse

== Demographics ==
Pioneer's racial demographics are

- White (38.36%)
- Hispanic (36.03%)
- Asian (14.27%)
- Multiracial (8.64%)
- Black (2.24%)
- Other (0.46%)

Pioneer's gender demographics are

- Male (50.73%)
- Female (49.27%)

== Notable alumni ==
- Rob Becker '74 — Playwright, Defending the Caveman.
- Steve Finn '69 — Philanthropist and former mayor of Los Altos Hills.
- Count Five — 1960's rock band.
- Dave Hoffmann '88 - Professional football player and All-American college football player for the Washington Huskies
- Bill Hullett '68 — Nashville guitarist.
- David E. Osborne '69 — Author, Reinventing Government and The Coming. Senior White House advisor, Clinton administration. 2018 Spur Award Winner, Historical Novel.
- Kevin Pollak '75 — Actor, impressionist, game show host, and comedian.
- Dave Righetti '76 — Professional baseball player and coach.
- Alan Chang '98 — Pianist and songwriter.
- Naomi Girma '18 — Professional soccer player for the United States women's national soccer team and Chelsea F.C. Women.
