= Calero, San Jose =

Calero
- Neighborhood of San Jose
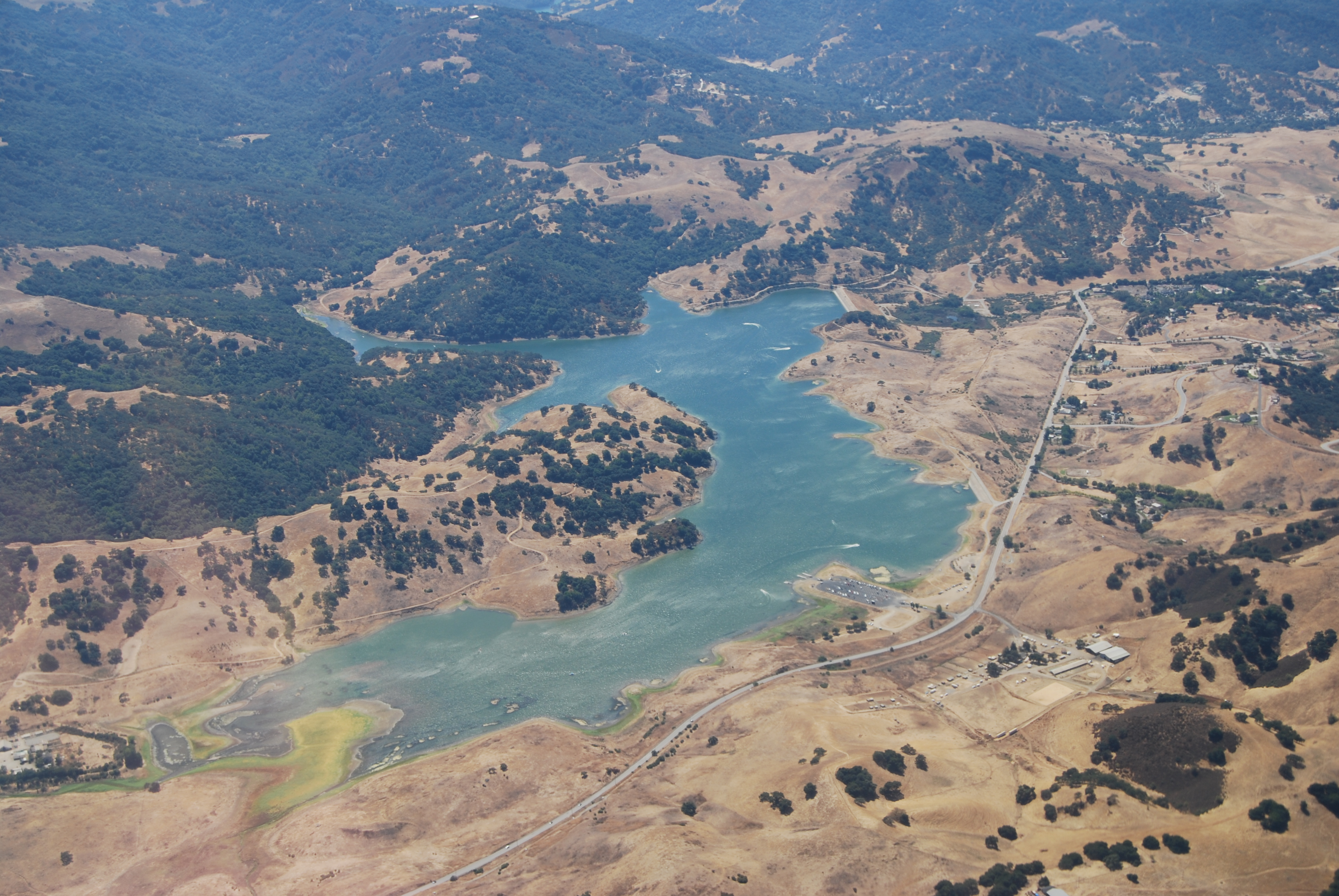
- Aerial view of Calero, with Calero Lake in the center

- Location within San Jose, California
- Coordinates: 37.192261°N 121.790063°W
- Country: United States
- State: California
- County: Santa Clara
- ZIP code: 95123, 95136
- Area code: 408

Calero, also known as Calero Lake and occasionally as South Almaden Valley, is a rural neighborhood in the Almaden Valley district of San Jose, California. Located in South San Jose, Calero is notably home to Calero County Park, which surrounds Calero Lake.

== History ==
During the era of Mexican California, the area of modern-day Calero was originally part of Rancho San Vicente, granted in 1842 to José de los Reyes Berreyesa, of the prominent Berryessa family of California, by Governor Juan Bautista Alvarado. Rancho San Vicente remained in continuous operation as a grazing ranch until 2009, when the Peninsula Open Space Trust purchased the site and transformed it into the Rancho San Vicente Open Space Preserve (now integrated with Calero County Park).

Calero Reservoir was formed in 1935, when a dam was built across the Arroyo Calero.

In 1968, Calero County Park was established around Calero Reservoir.

== Geography ==
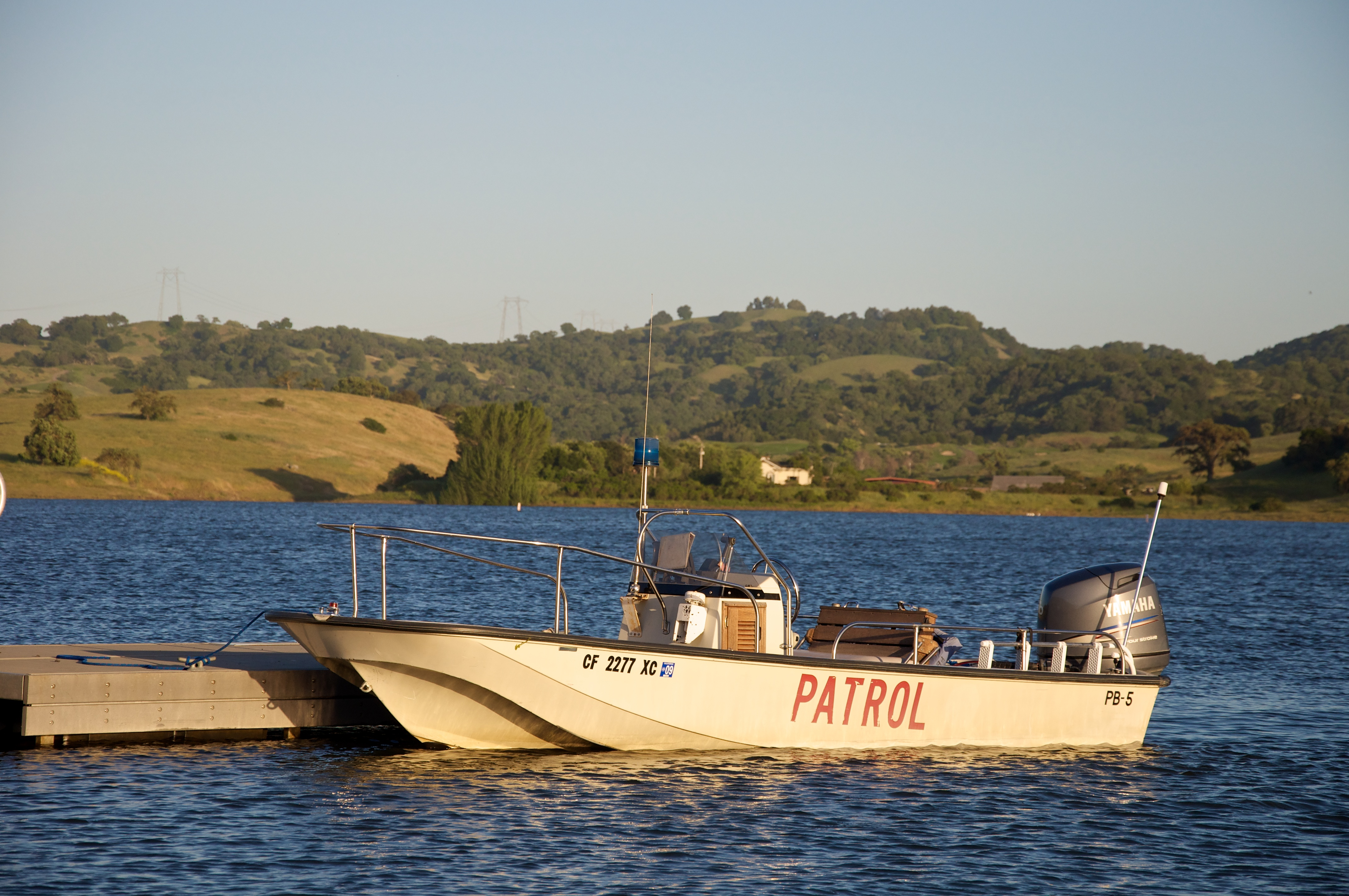
Ranger patrol on Calero Lake

Calero is a neighborhood within the larger Almaden Valley district of San Jose, California. It makes up the southwestern-most portion of South San Jose, located east of the Sierra Azul, north of the city of Morgan Hill, and west of Coyote Valley.

Though it is part of Almaden, Calero forms a separate planning district from the Almaden planning district, as Calero is rural in its entirety, unlike almost any other area in San Jose. The neighborhood has long rallied against development and the San Jose city planning department actively discourages development in Calero.

== Economy ==
Calero is largely a rural residential neighborhood, but there are numerous working ranches in the area, such as the Californio Cattle Company. Many of the businesses in the area relate to outdoor recreation, most notably the numerous horse stables.

== Parks ==
- Calero County Park
- Calero Reservoir
- Rancho San Vicente Open Space Preserve
