= Calero Reservoir =

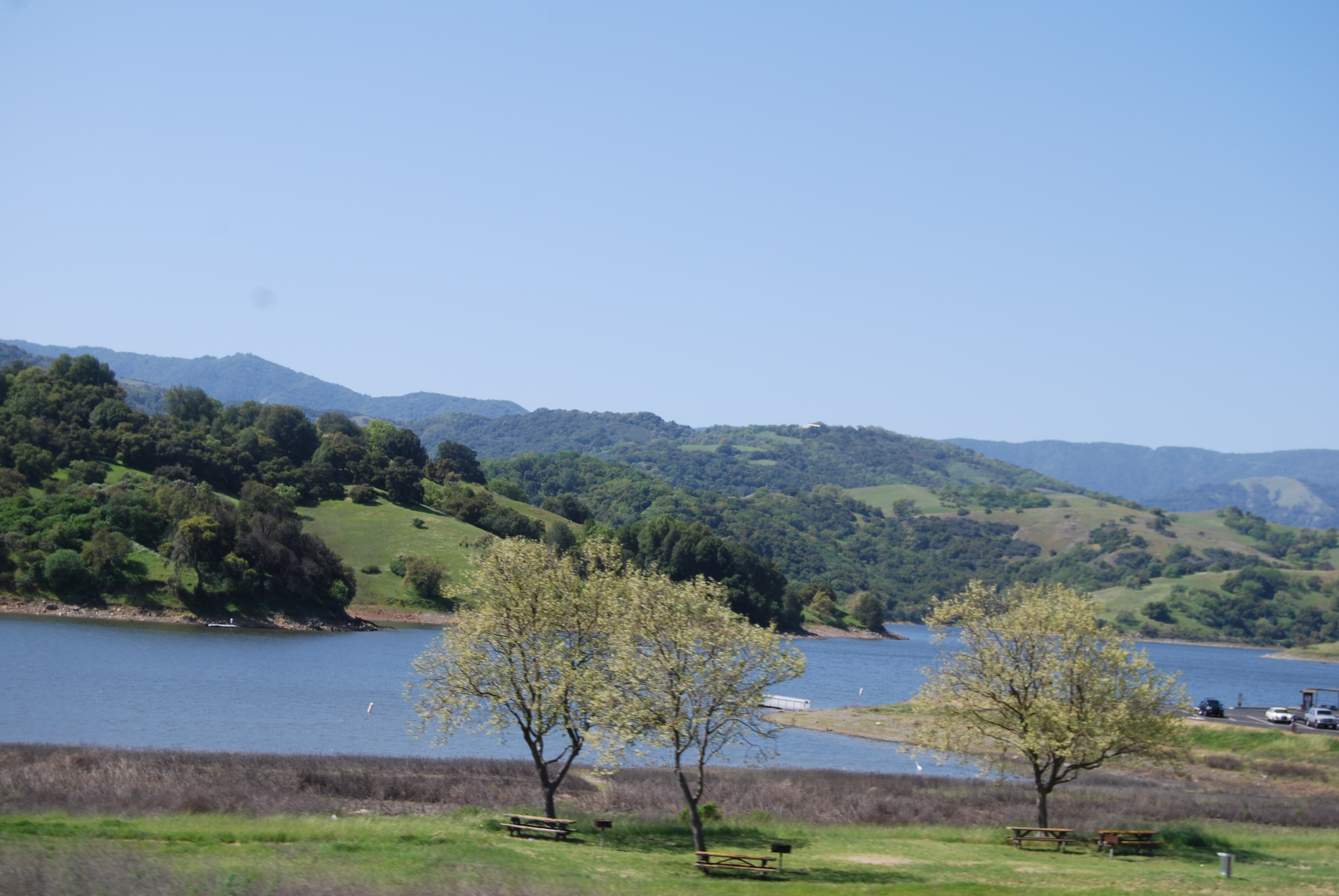
- May 2009

- Location within California Location within the United States
- Location: Santa Clara County, California
- Coordinates: 37°11′08″N 121°46′39″W
- Type: Reservoir
- Primary inflows: Cherry Canyon, Pine Tree Canyon
- Primary outflows: Arroyo Calero
- Catchment area: 7.14 sq mi (18.5 km^{2})
- Basin countries: United States
- Managing agency: Santa Clara Valley Water District
- Max. length: 2.2 miles (3.5 km)
- Surface area: 349 acres (141 ha)
- Water volume: 9,934 acre-feet (12,253,000 m^{3})
- Surface elevation: 476 feet (145 m)

Calero Reservoir, also called Calero Lake, is a reservoir in San Jose, California, located in the Calero neighborhood of Almaden Valley in South San Jose. It is the site of Calero County Park, which also includes a large area covering the lake and hundreds of acres of hills around it.

== History ==
The reservoir was formed by the Calero Dam, built in 1935 (91 years ago) across Arroyo Calero, which is also known as Calero Creek.

== Watershed and course ==
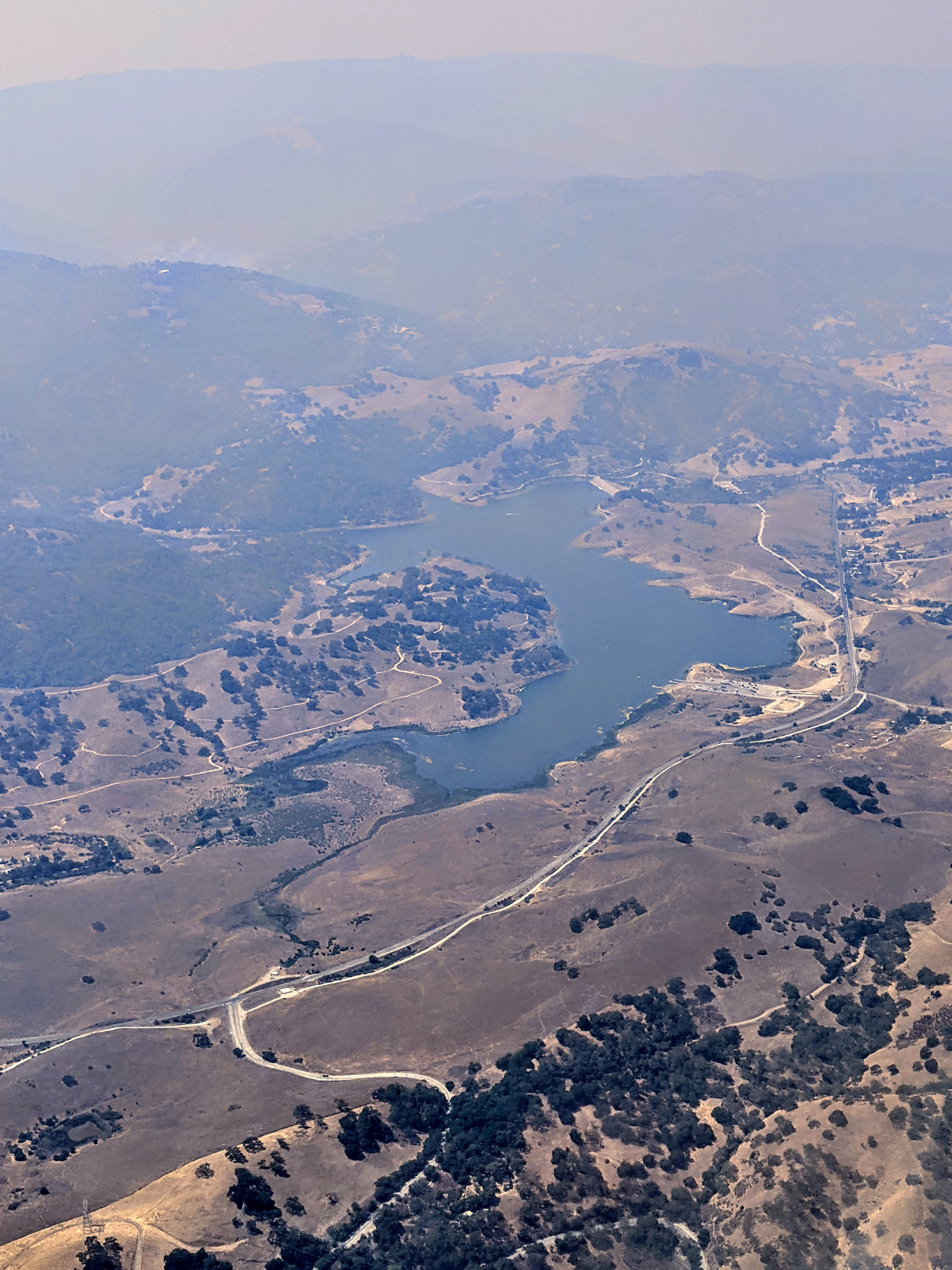
Calero Reservoir aerial view during the August 2021 wildfires' smoky air

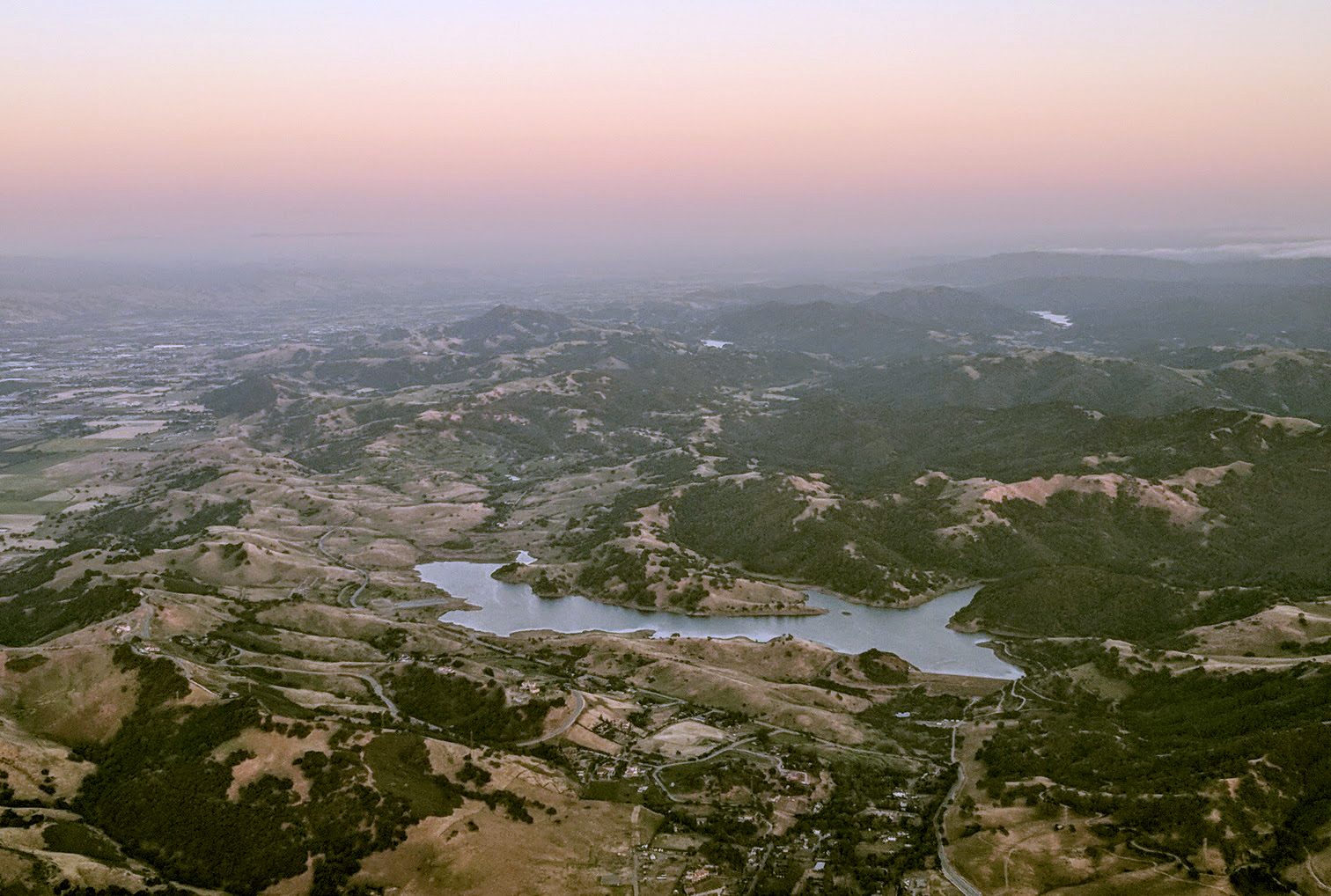
Another aerial view

Calero Dam is an earthen dam 90 feet (27 m) high and 840 feet (260 m) long containing 550,000 cubic yards (420,000 m^{3}) of material. Its crest is 490 feet (150 m) above sea level. The reservoir receives flows from the southwest via Cherry Canyon which has its origin at Fern Peak in the southeastern part of the Santa Cruz Mountains. It also receives minor inputs from the southeast via the ephemeral flows down Pine Tree Canyon

Calero Reservoir is the fourth largest reservoir owned by the Santa Clara Valley Water District. After capturing winter runoff from the nearby foothills and from water transferred, via a canal, from nearby Almaden Reservoir, reservoir water recharges groundwater basins and is also provided directly to water treatment plants, via the Almaden Valley Pipeline, to be treated and distributed to county residents. Calero Reservoir also can receive flows from Anderson Reservoir and San Luis Reservoir, via the recently restored Cross Valley and Calero pipelines which stretch 10.6 miles (17.1 km), starting from the Coyote Pump Plant in Morgan Hill, extending through parts of unincorporated Santa Clara County, and ending at the Calero Reservoir in South San Jose.

Because alluvium deposits were found beneath the dam in a 2012 independent engineering study, and these could liquify in an earthquake, reservoir levels are currently maintained 19 feet below the spillway. Retrofit construction of the dam may begin only after the retrofit on Anderson Reservoir is complete in 2031. This restriction limits Calero Reservoir to 45% of capacity or about 4,414 acre-feet. When the Calero Dam retrofit is completed, the capacity of Calero Reservoir could be restored to 9,738 acre-feet and increase the outlet capacity from 50 cfs to up to 100 cfs.

Water from Calero Reservoir is carried downstream by Arroyo Calero, a tributary to Alamitos Creek, which is in turn tributary to the Guadalupe River and thence to south San Francisco Bay.

== Ecology ==
The California Office of Environmental Health Hazard Assessment released a "Do Not Eat" warning regarding eating any fish caught from this reservoir based on the elevated mercury level. The primary fish caught in Calero Reservoir are non-native, including largemouth bass (Micropterus salmoides), Eurasian common carp (Cyprinus carpio), and black crappie (Pomoxis nigromaculatus).

== Recreation ==
A 4,471-acre (1,809 ha) county park surrounds the reservoir and provides limited fishing ("catch-and-release"), picnicking, hiking, and horseback riding activities. Although swimming is prohibited, boating, water-skiing and jet-skiing are permitted in the reservoir.

== See also ==
- List of lakes in California
- List of lakes in the San Francisco Bay Area
- List of reservoirs and dams in California
