= Reggie Smith (basketball) =

American basketball player

Personal information
- Born: August 21, 1970 (age 56) San Jose, California, U.S.
- Listed height: 6 ft 10 in (2.08 m)
- Listed weight: 240 lb (109 kg)

Career information
- High school: Leland (San Jose, California)
- College: TCU (1988–1992)
- NBA draft: 1992: 2nd round, 31st overall pick
- Drafted by: Portland Trail Blazers
- Playing career: 1992–1996
- Position: Power forward / center
- Number: 54

Career history
- 1992–1994: Portland Trail Blazers
- 1994: Valvi Girona
- 1994–1995: Pau-Orthez
- 1995–1996: Newcastle Falcons

Career highlights
- All-NBL First Team (1995); First-team All-SWC (1992)
- Stats at NBA.com
- Stats at Basketball Reference

Reginald D. Smith (born August 21, 1970) is an American former professional basketball player who played in the National Basketball Association (NBA) for the Portland Trail Blazers.
