= Almaden Vineyards =

American winery located in California

Coordinates: 37°14′16″N 121°53′35″W

- Location: Madera, California, USA
- Appellation: Santa Clara Valley AVA
- Formerly: Almadén Vineyards
- Founded: 1852
- Parent company: The Wine Group
- Known for: Almadén Grenache Rosé
- Varietals: Cabernet Sauvignon, Chardonnay, Riesling, Zinfandel, Merlot, Grenache, White Zinfandel
- Other products: Chablis, Chianti, Burgundy, Rhine
- Website: www.almaden.com

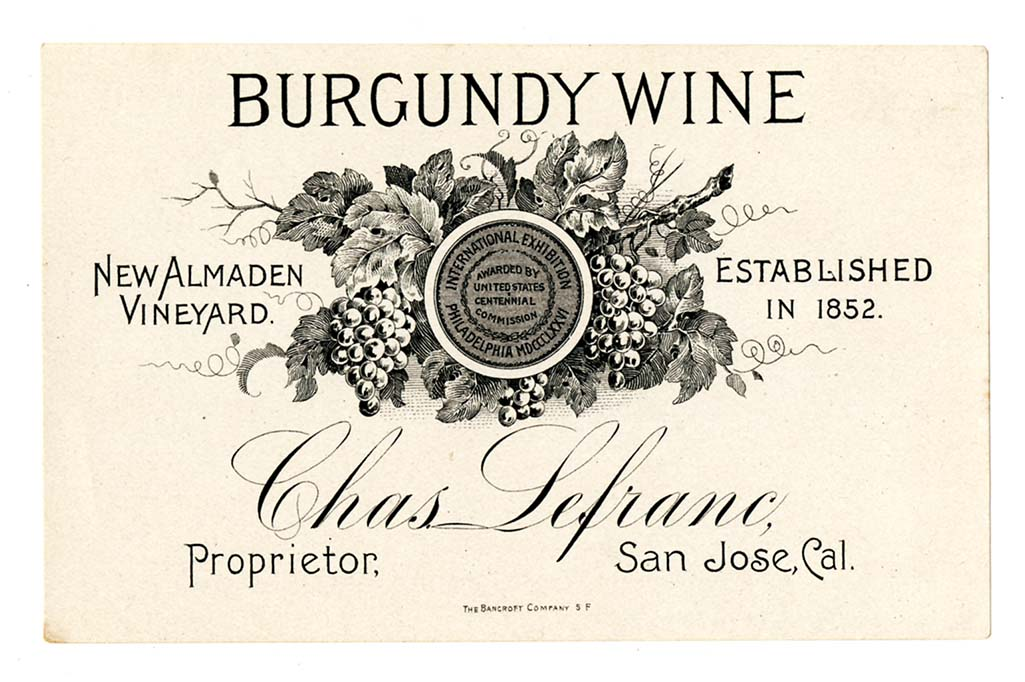
Historic wine label, New Almaden Vineyard, Chas. Lefranc proprietor

Almaden Vineyards, historically written as Almadén Vineyards, is a Californian winery. Founded in 1852, it is the oldest commercial winery in California. Originally located and established in Almaden Valley, San Jose, the winery has since moved to the San Joaquin Valley, primarily based in Escalon and Madera.

The Old Almadén Winery in San Jose is a registered California Historical Landmark and open to the public.

== History ==
The winery was established by Éthienne Thée in 1852, who named the vineyard after New Almaden, a nearby quicksilver mining town. Though sources contradict concerning details of the original foundation, it was undeniably Charles Le Franc, son-in-law of Thée, who planted the first choice European grape varieties at the foot of the Santa Cruz Mountains. The conditions of Pacific cool evening breeze and rocky soil are not sufficiently fertile for large yields but grapes of special quality.

Following Prohibition, Almadén as its wines were marketed, had great success with their blush wine, the White Grenache Rosé, allegedly the first popular pink wine in the United States.

The vineyard has undergone great change since, and as the home ground of Los Gatos became overrun by suburbs, Almaden Vineyards was among the first to move south and 1,000 feet (300 m) up, to Paicines in San Benito County, initially planting 2,000 acres (8.1 km^{2}) of mostly Chardonnay and Cabernet Sauvignon grapes with success, and claim of "the world’s largest varietal wine vineyard".
