= Evergreen Times =

- Type: Biweekly newspaper
- Format: Tabloid
- Owner(s): Times Media, Inc.
- Publisher: William Bellou
- Editor: William Bellou
- Founded: 1982
- Language: English
- Headquarters: 1900 Camden Ave, San Jose, CA United States
- Circulation: 20,000-32,000
- OCLC number: 39758998
- Website: timesmediainc.com

The Evergreen Times, established in 1982, is a twice monthly newspaper published in Evergreen, San Jose, California, United States. The Evergreen Times is part of Times Media, Inc., an "independently owned newspaper group devoted to accurate and balanced coverage of events that affect your community." It is published by William Bellou, Publisher/CEO, and with a pre-covid circulation of 18,000-20,000 copies. The newspaper is available in print and online.

In 2013, Times Media Inc. was recognized by the City of San Jose for its 30 years of community news coverage.

== Notable history ==
In 1994, the Evergreen Times was named in a story that spread across the United States when a video surfaced of a San Jose Councilwoman making racist and homophobic remarks. The paper's former editor, Bill Stubbee, said that "we do not feel it is enough of an issue to recall someone.

In 2000, the paper was accused by a city Councilwoman of censoring an op-ed that she penned for the paper. The paper had omitted a line in the op-ed in which the Councilwoman, Alice Woody, had expressed her support for a specific candidate to replace her on the Council. Bill Stubbee argued that he removed the sentence because it violated his rule that the newspaper columns not endorse any candidate.
