= Dave Hoffmann (American football) =

American football player (born 1970)

No. 54, 59
- Position: Linebacker

Personal information
- Born: July 24, 1970 (age 56); San Luis Obispo, California, U.S.
- Listed height: 6 ft 2 in (1.88 m)
- Listed weight: 233 lb (106 kg)

Career information
- High school: Pioneer (San Jose, California)
- College: Washington
- NFL draft: 1993: 6th round, 146th overall pick

Career history
- Chicago Bears (1993)*; Pittsburgh Steelers (1993); San Francisco 49ers (1995)*; London Monarchs (1995)
- * Offseason or practice squad member only

Awards and highlights
- National champion (1991); 2× First-team All-American (1991, 1992); Pac-10 Defensive Player of the Year (1992); 2× First-team All-Pac-10 (1991, 1992)
- Stats at Pro Football Reference

Dave Hoffmann (born July 24, 1970) is an American former professional football player who was a linebacker in the National Football League (NFL). He played college football with the Washington Huskies, earning All-American honors in 1992. He was selected by the Chicago Bears in the 1993 NFL draft and played for the Pittsburgh Steelers. After his football career, he became a member of the United States Secret Service, protecting presidents Bill Clinton and George W. Bush as well as vice presidents Al Gore and Dick Cheney.

== Early life ==
Hoffmann attended Pioneer High School in San Jose, California.

== College career ==
Hoffmann played at the University of Washington from 1989 to 1992. Playing with the Huskies, he was a first-team All-American, Butkus Award finalist, member of the 1991 National Champions, three-time Pac-10 conference champion, two-time All-Pac-10 player, Pac-10 Defensive Player of the Year, and team captain in 1992 for coach Don James. Following his Washington career, Hoffman played in both the East–West Shrine Game and Hula Bowl.

Hoffmann was inducted into the Husky Hall of Fame in 2012.
