= Jason Hardtke =

American baseball player (born 1971)

- Second baseman
- Born: September 15, 1971 (age 53); Milwaukee, Wisconsin, U.S.
- Batted: Switch Threw: Right

Professional debut
- MLB: September 8, 1996, for the New York Mets
- NPB: May 6, 2000, for the Hanshin Tigers

Last appearance
- MLB: July 13, 1998, for the Chicago Cubs
- NPB: October 6, 2000, for the Hanshin Tigers

MLB statistics
- Batting average: .231
- Home runs: 2
- Runs batted in: 16

NPB statistics
- Batting average: .272
- Home runs: 4
- Runs batted in: 27
- Stats at Baseball Reference

Teams
- New York Mets (1996–1997); Chicago Cubs (1998); Hanshin Tigers (2000)
Medals
Men's baseball
Representing United States
Pan American Games
Silver medal – second place	1999 Winnipeg	Team

Jason Robert Hardtke (born September 15, 1971) is an American former professional baseball second baseman.

Drafted by the Cleveland Indians in the 3rd round of the 1990 MLB draft. Hardtke made his MLB debut with the New York Mets on September 8, 1996, and appear in his final MLB game on July 13, 1998.

He also played in Nippon Professional Baseball (NPB) for the Hanshin Tigers in the 2000 season, and has managed the Visalia Rawhide. He is the president of a baseball training academy in Campbell, California, Hardtke World of Baseball.
