= Old Almadén Winery =

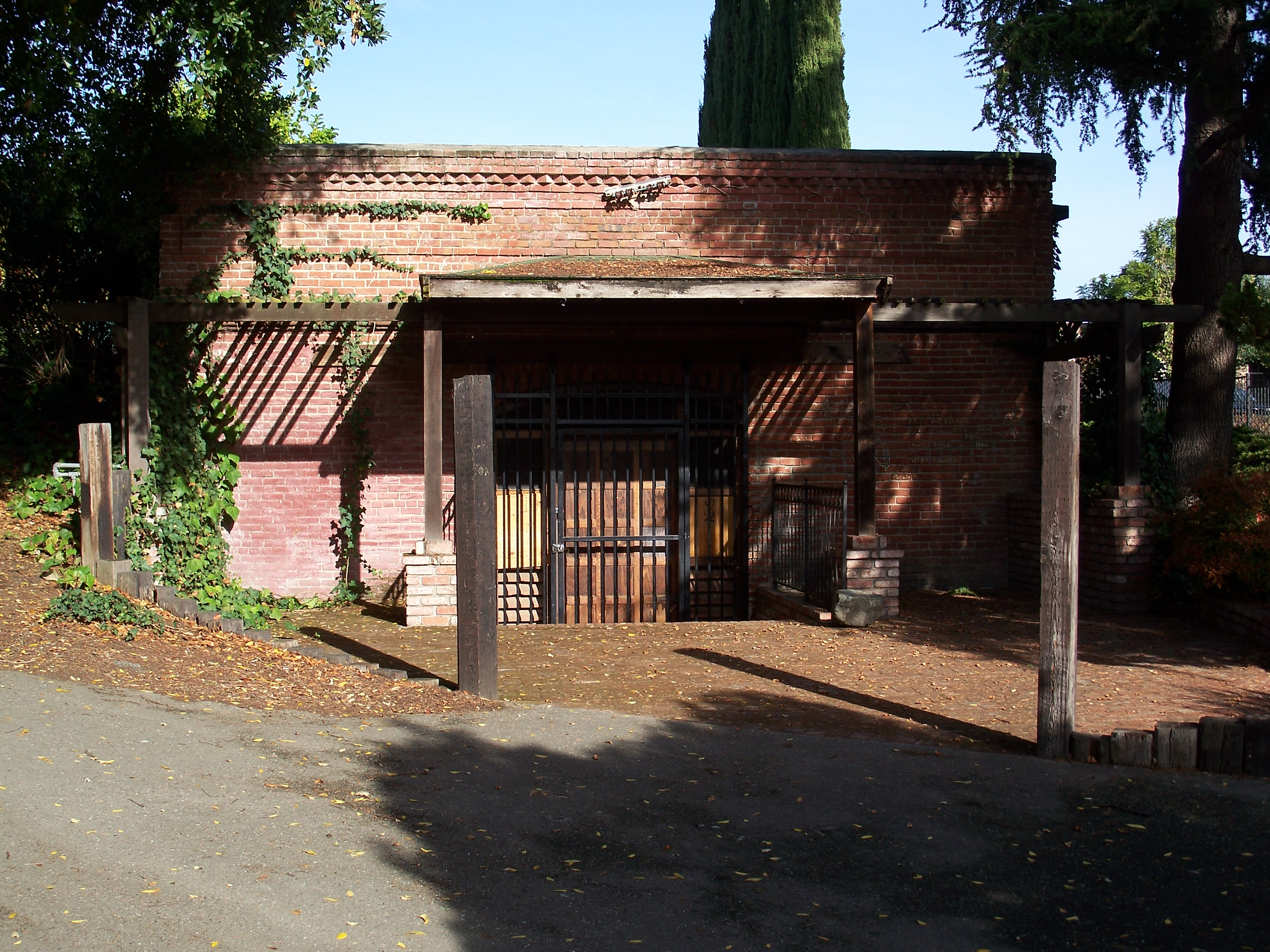
- The original building of Almaden winery

- Location in San Jose
- 37.23761°N 121.892951°W
- Location: Near 1530 Blossom Hill Rd, San Jose, California

California Historical Landmark
- Official name: Almaden Vineyards
- Designated: July 31, 1953
- Reference no.: 505

The Old Almadén Winery is a historic wine production site in Santa Clara County, California, situated on the eastern slopes of the Santa Cruz Mountains.

Established in 1852, the Old Almaden Winery was the oldest winery in California, and the site is designated as a California Historical Landmark.

The winery is no longer in operation - the Almaden Vineyards company moved to Madera, California, and the vestigial remains of the property have been made into a public park. Much of the prior winery grounds have also been converted to single family homes, following a series of environmental planning studies.
