= Almaden Resident =

Defunct newspaper from California, US

- Type: Weekly newspaper
- Owner: MediaNews Group
- Founded: 2003
- Language: English

The Almaden Resident is a newspaper serving the San Jose area. It is published weekly on Fridays and distributed in The Mercury News.

== History ==
The Almaden Resident was founded in 2003 as part of a group of weekly newspapers in the Metro Newspapers group, called Silicon Valley Community Newspapers. Dan Pulcrano and David Cohen co-founded Metro Newspapers in 1985. In 2001, Silicon Valley Community Newspapers, spun off from Metro Newspapers, under chief executive officer David Cohen. In 2005, Cohen sold Silicon Valley Community Newspapers to Knight Ridder, though he stayed on as publisher and chief executive for the SVCN papers. In 2006, Knight Ridder was purchased by McClatchy Co., which immediately sold SVCN and the San Jose Mercury News to MediaNews Group.
