= David E. Osborne =

American author and consultant (born 1951)

David Osborne
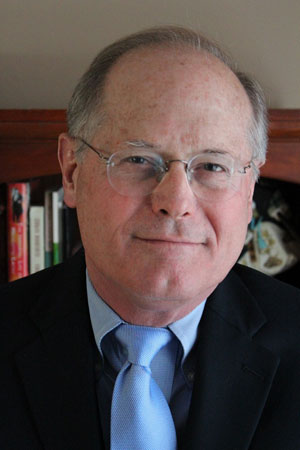
- Born: June 1, 1951 (age 75)
- Education: Stanford University
- Website: www.reinventgov.com

David Osborne (born June 1, 1951) is an American author and consultant. He is the author or co-author of seven books, one of which was a New York Times best seller. He served as a senior advisor to Vice President Gore in 1993, helping to lead an effort to reform the federal government. He is currently director of the Progressive Policy Institute's project on Reinventing America's Schools, and his first novel was published in 2017.

== Career ==
Off and on since 1990, Osborne has served as a senior fellow at the Progressive Policy Institute (PPI) in Washington, D.C. In late 2014, Osborne was appointed director of a PPI project on Reinventing America's Schools, which focuses on reforming the public school system to treat every public school like a charter school. The project is financially supported by the Walton Family Foundation, the Broad Foundation, and the Arnold Foundation.

As director of this project, Osborne authors reports and articles about education reform and hosts conferences and forums. His writing on education for PPI is available at the Progressive Policy Institute's website, www.progressivepolicy.org, and at his blog at U.S. News. In 2017, his book on education reform - Reinventing America's Schools: Creating a 21st Century Education System - was published by Bloomsbury Publishing.

Osborne has authored or co-authored seven books: Reinventing America's Schools: Creating a 21st Century Education System (forthcoming in September 2017); The Coming (2017); The Price of Government (2004); The Reinventor's Fieldbook (2000), Banishing Bureaucracy (1997), Reinventing Government (1992), and Laboratories of Democracy (1988). He has also written articles for The Washington Post, The Atlantic, The New York Times Magazine, Harper's, The New Republic, Governing, Education Week, and other publications.

Osborne's first book, Laboratories of Democracy, argued that states were pioneering new education, economic development, health care, housing, welfare and other policies as a response to the dramatic change from an industrial economy to a knowledge-based, information-age economy. Reinventing Government, co-authored with Ted Gaebler, described how public sector institutions across America were transforming the bureaucratic models they had inherited from the past and, thereby, creating more flexible, creative, and entrepreneurial systems and organizations. In his next book, Banishing Bureaucracy, Osborne and his co-author Peter Plastrik described the most powerful strategies to create such organizations. The sequel, The Reinventor's Fieldbook, provided "how-to" information on 75 different tools reinventors could use, from performance management and customer service standards to competitive bidding and labor-management partnerships. In his fifth book, The Price of Government, Osborne applied many of these concepts to the fiscal crisis plaguing the public sector at that time. Osborne and his co-author, Peter Hutchinson, argued that the fiscal crisis would linger with the U.S. for decades to come.

In 1994, Osborne joined the Public Strategies Group, a consulting firm created to help public organizations improve their performance. Osborne served as senior partner for that organization from 1994 through 2014. He worked with large and small governments from cities, counties, and school districts to states, federal agencies, and foreign governments. In that role, he gave speeches on reinventing government in many countries and advised presidents, ministers, governors, mayors, city managers, school superintendents, and other public sector leaders.

In 1993, Osborne served as a senior advisor to Vice President Al Gore. In this role, he, along with others, ran the National Performance Review. Vice President Gore called the National Performance Review his "reinventing government task force", and its name was later changed to the National Partnership for Reinventing Government. Osborne was the chief author of the September 1993 report generated by the National Performance Review, which laid out the Clinton Administration's reinvention agenda. Time magazine called it "the most readable federal document in memory." In 2000, Osborne served as an advisor to Al Gore's presidential campaign.

Much of Osborne's work on reinventing government is available at his website, www.reinventgov.com.

== Other public service work ==
Since 1992, David has served as a fellow at the National Academy of Public Administration, a Congressionally chartered organization similar to the National Academy of Sciences. From 1992 through 1997, he served as chairman of the Alliance for Redesigning Government, a National Academy initiative to help public sector leaders and managers at all levels of government learn more about reinvention and redesign.

Currently he is president of the Institute for Excellence in Government, a not-for-profit organization that provides consulting and other services to public sector leaders. Since 1998, he has been a member of the National Selection Committee for Harvard University's Innovations in American Government Awards.

From 1991 through 1997, David served on the Mass Jobs Council, Massachusetts' statewide workforce development board. He chaired the One-Stop Career Center Committee, which led the development of One-Stop Career Centers in Massachusetts.

From 1998-99, he served as a member of the Education Commission of the States' National Commission on Governing America's Schools.

== Historical novel ==
David is the author of a historical novel published by Bloomsbury Publishing in February 2017. The Coming is an epic novel of Native/White relations in North America, told through the life of Daytime Smoke—a real historical figure, the red-haired son of William Clark and a Nez Perce woman. The novel begins in 1805, as Lewis and Clark stumble out of the Rockies, on the edge of starvation. The Nez Perce feed the explorers and help them build canoes and navigate the rapids of Columbia, then spend two months hosting them the following spring, before leading them back across the snowbound mountains.

This marks the beginning of a deep and lasting friendship between the two cultures. The Nez Perce befriend American fur trappers, invite missionaries, and even help the U.S. in its wars with neighboring tribes. But when gold is discovered on Nez Perce lands in 1860, it sets an inevitable tragedy in motion. Seventeen years later, when the U.S. military forces all Nez Perce bands onto a reservation, the last great Indian war breaks out.

Daytime Smoke's life spanned the seven decades between first contact and defeat of the Nez Perce. The Coming thus captures the trajectory experienced by so many Native peoples: from friendship and cooperate to betrayal, war, and genocide. With a large cast of characters and a vast geography, the novel braids historical events with the drama of one man's life. Rigorously researched and cinematically rendered, The Coming is a page-turning historical novel, and was in 2018 the winner of the Spur Award for Best Western Historical Novel.

== Bibliography ==
- Reinventing America's Schools: Creating a 21st Century Education System, David Osborne (Bloomsbury; September 2017) ISBN 978-1632869913
- The Coming, David Osborne, (Bloomsbury; 2017) ISBN 978-1632863850
- The Price of Government: Getting the Results We Need in an Age of Permanent Fiscal Crisis, David Osborne & Peter Hutchinson, (Basic Books; 2004) ISBN 9780465053643
- The Reinventor's Fieldbook: Tools for Transforming Your Government, David Osborne & Peter Plastrick, (Jossey-Bass; 2000) ISBN 9780787943325
- Banishing Bureaucracy: The Five Strategies For Reinventing Government, David Osborne & Peter Plastrick, (Basic Books; 1997) ISBN 9780201626322
- Reinventing Government: How the Entrepreneurial Spirit is Transforming the Public Sector, David Osborne & Ted Gaebler, (Plume; 1993) ISBN 9780452269422
- Laboratories of Democracy: New Breed of Governor Creates Models for National Growth, David Osborne (Harvard Business School Press; 1990) ISBN 9780875842332
