= Capay =

Capay may refer to:

- Capay, California, in Yolo County
- Capay, Glenn County, California
- Capay Hills
- Capay Valley
  - Capay Valley AVA
