= Rancho Rincon de Musalacon =

Mexican land grant in California

Coordinates: 38.78°N 123.00°W

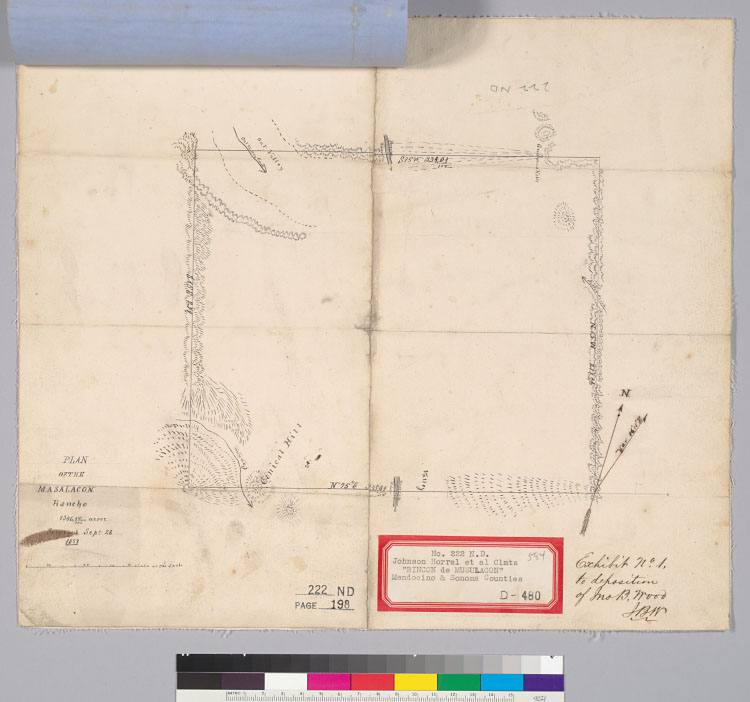
A map of Rancho Rincon de Musalacon from 1859

Rancho Rincon de Musalacon was a 8,867-acre (35.88 km^{2}) Mexican land grant in present-day Sonoma County, California given in 1846 by Governor Pío Pico to Francisco Berreyesa. The grant extended along both sides of the Russian River and encompassed present-day Cloverdale and Asti.

== History ==
Francisco Antonio Berreyesa (1824–1856) was the son of José de los Reyes Berreyesa, the grantee of Rancho San Vicente, and who was killed by John C. Frémont's men in 1846. Francisco Berreyesa was a soldier at San Francisco, and was also a grantee of Rancho Cañada de Capay in 1846. Pío Pico granted two square leagues to Francisco Berreyesa in 1846, and Berryessa sold the rancho to Johnson Horrel in 1851. In 1856, Francisco was murdered in his home in Santa Clara.

Johnson Horrell (1798–1867) born Pennsylvania, was a lawyer came to California in 1849. He constructed a dam across the Yuba River, and afterwards aided in laying off the city of Marysville. He was the owner of the first silver mine opened in Nevada.

With the cession of California to the United States following the Mexican-American War, the 1848 Treaty of Guadalupe Hidalgo provided that the land grants would be honored. As required by the Land Act of 1851, a claim for Rancho Rincon de Musalacon was filed with the Public Land Commission in 1853, and the grant was patented to Johnson Horrell, Joseph Green, and Ramón G. de la Riva in 1866.

In 1856 R. B. Markle and W. J. Miller bought 759 acres (3.1 km^{2}) from Johnson Horrell. In 1859, James Abram Kleiser bought Markle's interest, and the town Cloverdale was laid out.

== See also ==
- Berreyesa family
