= Capay Valley AVA =

American Viticultural Area in Yolo County, California

Coordinates: 38°45′04″N 122°08′21″W

Capay Valley
- Wine region
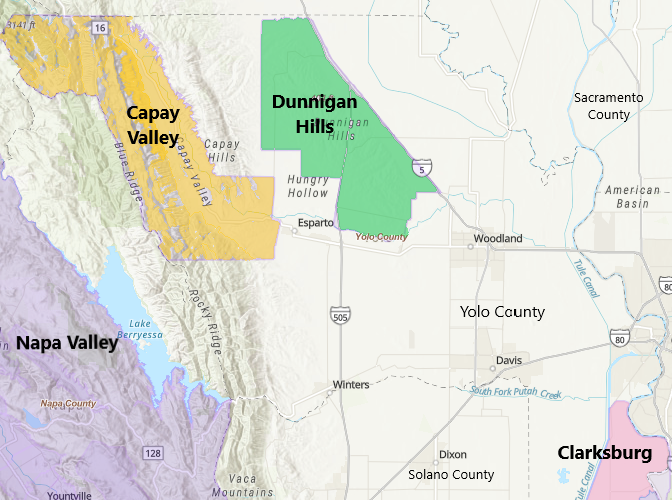
- Type: American Viticultural Area
- Year established: 2002
- Years of wine industry: 166
- Country: United States
- Part of: California, Yolo County
- Other regions in California, Yolo County: Clarksburg AVA, Dunnigan Hills AVA, Merritt Island AVA
- Growing season: 150–250 days
- Climate region: Region III-V
- Heat units: 3,100–4,748 GDD units
- Precipitation (annual average): 15 to 40 in (380–1,020 mm)
- Soil conditions: silty clay loam on alluvial fans
- Total area: 102,400 acres (160 sq mi)
- Size of planted vineyards: 25 acres (10 ha)
- No. of vineyards: 4
- Grapes produced: Cabernet Franc, Cabernet Sauvignon, Marsanne, Mourvedre, Petite Verdot, Sauvignon Blanc, Syrah, Tempranillo, Viognier
- No. of wineries: 4

Capay Valley is an American Viticultural Area (AVA) situated in the landform, Capay Valley, in northwestern Yolo County of Northern California. It was established as the nation's 148^{th}, the state's 89th and the county's fourth wine appellation on December 20, 2002 by the Bureau of Alcohol, Tobacco and Firearms (ATF), Treasury after reviewing the petition from Tom Frederick and Pam Welch of Capay Valley Vineyards proposing a viticultural area in Yolo County known as "Capay Valley."

The 102,400-acre (160 sq mi) area is a warm, sunny valley nestled between the Blue Ridge Mountains and the Capay Hills bordering Napa, Lake and Colusa Counties about 80 miles (130 km) northeast of San Francisco. The valley has several winegrape growers including the petitioner, Capay Valley Vineyards, its largest winery whose vintages received gold and silver medals from the California State Fair and silver and bronze from the Orange County Fair. At the outset, there were approximately 25 acres (10 ha) of cultivation in the valley. The plant hardiness zones are 9a and 9b.

== History ==
In 1849, water in two large creeks, in hillside arroyos and in spring-fed sloughs, coursed through the low mountains along the western boundary of Yolo County and spilled eastward over sloping low lands to the 15 miles (24 km) length of a narrow flat valley to turn east for five miles (8.0 km) as it passed through low bordering hills at the western edge of the Sacramento Valley into the Sacramento River which seasonally overflowed its banks to nourish large areas of permanent swampland. Tules were "as high as a man standing tall in his stirrups," and when the first State Legislature met that year to establish the physical limits of several northern counties, it named the area "Yoloy," the Indian word for "a place abounding with rushes." "Yoloy" quickly became Yolo, and the creek that the Indians called "Yoso Capi" and the Spanish called "Rio Jesus Maria" became Cache Creek, as Californians adopted the local name used by pioneer trappers who stored beaver furs along its banks.
The first county records referred to it variously as Capay Valley, Cache Creek Valley, Cache Creek Canyon or simply "Canon." Southward the level floor of Capay Valley widened from one to four miles (1.6–6.4 km), and the creek lying along the base of the bluffs on the east side changed too in width as gravel bars or erosion at the foot of arroyos altered its course or the swiftness of its current. It proceeded from an elevation of 400 to 150 feet (122–46 m) at the southern end where the bluffs were replaced by low rounded hills. Covered with oak, pine, cottonwood and chaparral, the valley, the stream and the hillsides supported an abundance of fish, waterfowl, aquatic animals and large game. Ewing Young, mountain man and trapper, camped there with a party in the winter of 1832 "were the first of their race in that valley," and the indigenous tribes of the Southern Wintun Nation, who had established at least eight villages along Cache Creek, blamed them for a plague suffered the following summer.
As early as the 1840s, this valley identified with Cache Creek was called 'Capay," using the Wintun word "capi" or "Kaipai" meaning "stream." With its source from Clear Lake, Cache Creek flows 20 miles (32 km) south-eastward into Yolo County through mountain canyons lends its name to the Capay Valley. The name "Capay Valley" was used in the late 1840s to identify the area when Pio Pico, Governor of the territory of Alta California, granted nine square leagues of land called the Rancho Canada de Capay to three Berryessa brothers. John Gillig purchased part of the Rancho Canada de Capay Mexican land grant and established Yolo County's first winery in 1860. The petitioners submitted as evidence excerpts from the book "Capay Valley: The Land & The People" by Ada Merhoff. A copy of a map titled "Property owners 1858 Canada de Capay Grant" on page 6 of the book shows further subdivisions as lands were sold. In addition, the Adobe Ranch, a 19th-century Capay Valley ranch owned by John Gillig also contained a vineyard and winery. "The Western Shore Gazeteer & Commercial Directory for the State of California-Yolo County" by C.P. Sprague and H.W. Atwell stated in 1869 that the Capay Valley Winery at Gillig's ranch processed grapes from his and several other small vineyards in the vicinity that yielded 30,000 US gal (110,000 L) of wine in both red and white varieties. Frank T. Gilbert's "The Illustrated Atlas and History of Yolo County" stated in 1879 that Gillig's vineyard was "awarded the premium in 1861 for having the finest vineyard in the state."

== Terroir ==
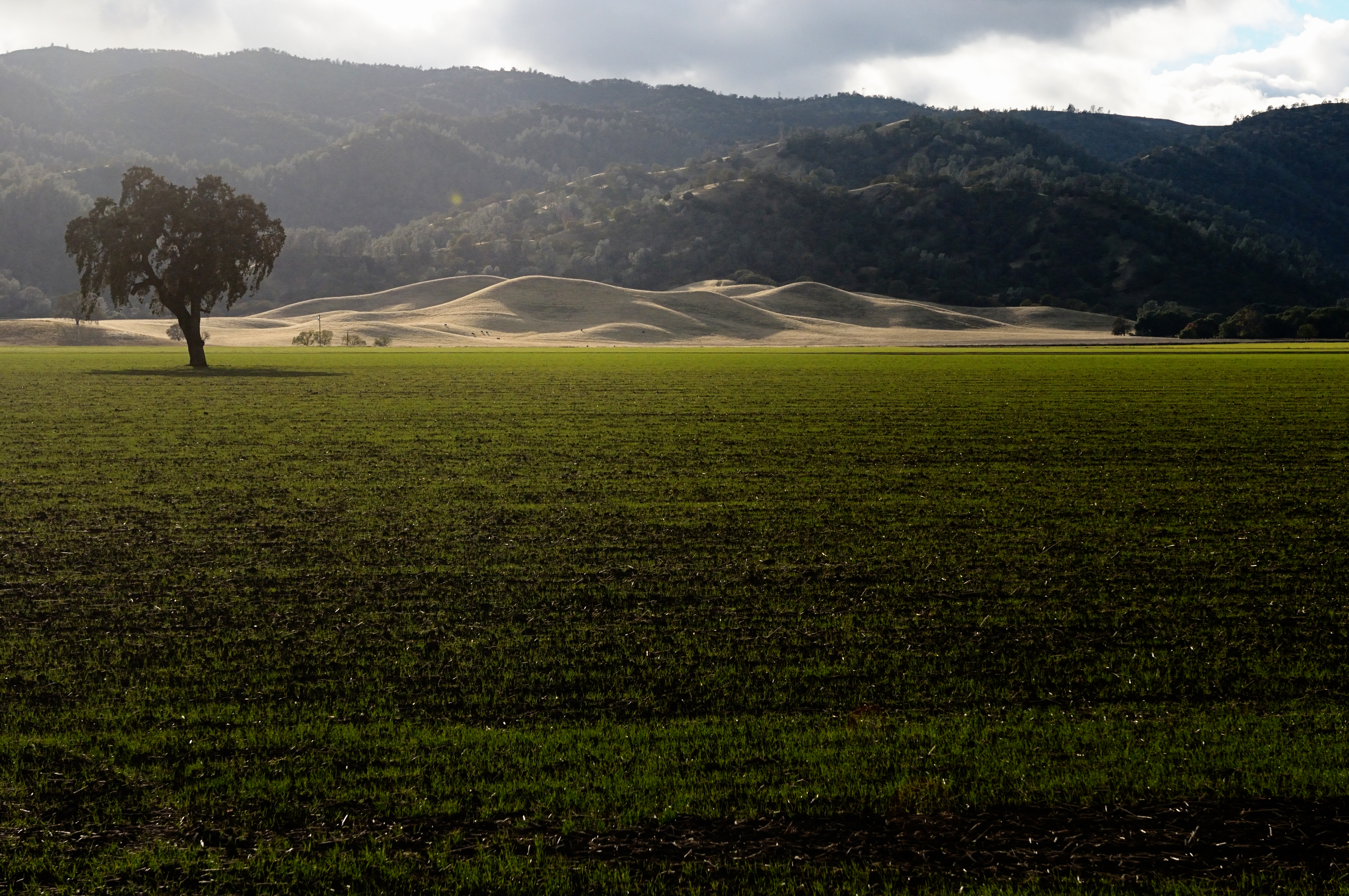
Capay Valley

=== Topography ===
The elevation boundaries of the Capay Valley viticultural area range from 330 feet (100 m) on the valley floor, to 2,460 feet (750 m) at the top of the Blue Ridge and 1,800 feet (550 m) at the top of the Capay Hills.

=== Climate ===
According to the petitioners, hot, dry summers and a long growing season characterize the climate of the Capay Valley viticultural area. Portions of the valley receive moderating breezes from the Sacramento Delta and San Francisco Bay. Fog creeps over the tops of the Blue Ridge during heavy fog periods in the Bay, but the valley is shielded from the ground fog that is pervasive in the Sacramento Valley. Winters are moderate and late spring frosts are occasional enough to negate the need for active frost protection. Also, the petitioners state that the Capay Valley climate is warmer than the Napa Valley to the west. This allows the Capay Valley to avoid the frost problems that are common in Napa and also offers an earlier growing season, typically 3–4 weeks. This warmer climate also reduces the need for as many sulfur sprays throughout the growing season. Additionally, the petitioners state that the Capay Valley differs from its Central Valley neighbors to the east in that, while they share a warmer climate, Capay Valley's bud-break is typically 1–2 weeks later.

=== Soil ===
The petitioners assert that the soils of the "Capay Valley" viticultural area range from Yolo-Brentwood, which is a well-drained, nearly level, silty clay loam on alluvial fans, to Dibble-Millsholm, which is a well drained, steep to very steep loam to silty clay loam over sandstone. Some areas have clay soils with creek rock and debris intermixed. Volcanic ash is also found in some areas, primarily in the rolling hills in the center of the valley. The petitioners contend that these clay soils intermixed with creek rock and volcanic ash, add a distinctive viticultural aspect to the area. One of the major soil differences between Capay Valley and the adjacent Central Valley area is the abundance of calcareous soils. This supply of calcium makes the clay soils of the Capay Valley less binding and allows grapevine roots to penetrate through the soils more easily. Water usage is therefore less than would be expected given the warm climatic conditions. The calcium-magnesium ratio in the soils is easier to manage because it is easier to add magnesium than calcium.

== Vineyards and Wineries ==
- Capay Valley Vineyards
- Séka Hills
- Simas Family Vineyard
- Taber Ranch
