= Berryessa (disambiguation) =

The name Berryessa originates from the Berreyesa family in California.

Other usages of the word may refer to things named after the family, including:

- Berryessa, San Jose, a district in California
  - Berryessa Union School District in Berryessa, San Jose
  - Berryessa/North San José station, a BART station in Berryessa, San Jose
  - Berryessa station (VTA), a light rail station in Berryessa, San Jose
- Berryessa Creek, a seasonal creek in San Jose and Milpitas, California
- Lake Berryessa, Napa County, California
- Berryessa Valley, California

== See also ==
- José Berreyesa (disambiguation)
