= Monticello, California =

Monticello
- Former settlement
- Location in California
- Coordinates: 38°34′40″N 122°12′26″W
- Country: United States
- State: California
- County: Napa
- Demolished: 1953–7
- Elevation: 443 ft (135 m)

Monticello was a town in Napa County, California, United States. The site of the settlement is completely covered by Lake Berryessa.

== History ==
Monticello was a town erected within Rancho Las Putas, a Mexican land grant of 35,516 acres (143.73 km^{2}) given in 1843 by Governor Manuel Micheltorena to José de los Reyes Berreyesa and Sexto "Sisto" Berelleza, members of the Berryessa family of California. The grant was enclosed in a river valley with Putah Creek running through it. After California was ceded to the United States in the Treaty of Guadalupe Hidalgo, the Berreyesas filed the claim with the American Public Land Commission in their wives' names in 1852, and the grant was patented to them in 1863.

By 1853, José de Jesus and Sisto Berelleza had sold minor parcels of Rancho Las Putas, referred to as Berryessa Ranch by the American settlers, to pay gambling debts. They owed Edward Schultz $1,645 but couldn't pay him in cash; Schultz petitioned the county to auction a major 26,000-acre (110 km^{2}) section of the Berryessa holdings. In the auction, Schultz paid only $2,000 for the huge parcel, and quickly resold it for $100,000 to a consortium of developers.

In 1866, the developers holding the majority of land in the valley divided Rancho Las Putas into smaller parcels to sell to farmers, and platted a town called Monticello. Within a year, the valley was filled with farmers who enjoyed mild winters and bountiful harvests, especially of wheat. By 1870, Monticello contained a cemetery, a general store, blacksmith shops, hotels and various other businesses. In 1875, a former toll road through the valley was opened to become a public road, maintained by the county. A four- and six-horse stagecoach ran from the 300 men working at the remote quicksilver mining town of Knoxville south through rocky hills to Monticello, where the horses were changed, then west to Napa. The Berreyesas moved from their original hacienda holdings to smaller dwellings. The large adobe estate house belonging to Sisto Berreyesa was left to ruin, but a second, smaller one, was held by a settler named Abraham Clark. In the late 19th century, the valley floor was covered with family farms whose land titles could be traced to the Homestead Act of 1862. Much of the valley floor was covered with dry-farmed wheat and barley fields, with some orchards and grapevines mixed in. Ranching was mostly in the foothills. In 1900 and 1901, news of a high-quality oil strike in Berryessa Valley brought speculators and experts in drilling, but no results.

== Damming Putah Creek ==
In 1896, a heavy stone bridge with three large arches was built across Putah Creek about 1.5 miles (2 km) from Monticello, along the road leading to Napa. The bridge cost $19,500 and, at 298 feet (91 m) long, was the largest stone bridge west of the Rocky Mountains. The well-engineered bridge survived the swollen flood of Putah Creek every winter thenceforward.

As early as 1906, proposals were put forward to dam Putah Creek to form a reservoir. In 1907, the Mulholland-Goethals-Davis plan proposed a dam at Devil's Gate, the southeastern limit of the valley. Other plans were formulated, but no proposal was acted upon until 1947 when Solano County and the United States Bureau of Reclamation together formed the Solano Project, a combination of water plans including Monticello Dam, the Putah Diversion Dam, the Putah South Canal, the Terminal Dam and Reservoir, the Green Valley Conduit and various related water distribution systems. Residents of Monticello protested, but California Governor Earl Warren and Solano County promoted the dam as necessary for the economic and agricultural growth of the surrounding area. Residents started leaving the valley to find homes elsewhere.

Dorothea Lange and Pirkle Jones were commissioned to shoot a photographic documentary of the death of the town, and of the displacement of its residents, for Life, but the magazine did not run the piece. Lange's Aperture magazine, however, devoted one whole issue to the photojournalists' work.

Construction of the dam began in 1953. Vegetation in the valley was chopped down, fences torn down and buildings demolished down to their foundations. The town cemetery was moved to Spanish Flat, a bluff overlooking the valley. The Putah Creek Bridge, too well made to easily demolish, was left in place to be covered by the rising waters. Monticello Dam was completed in 1957, and Lake Berryessa was formed. On February 26, 1957, crews poured the last bucket of concrete for Monticello Dam. Following tradition, they tossed in a few coins as well.

A post office functioned at Monticello from 1867 to 1956.

George C. Read, the town's mayor from 1945-1949, later served in the administration of Dwight D. Eisenhower as a deputy assistant secretary of the Employment and Training Administration.
