= José Berreyesa =

José Berreyesa, Jose Berreyesa, José Berryessa, Jose Berryessa, José Berrelleza, or Jose Berrelleza may refer to:

- José de los Reyes Berreyesa (1785–1846), also written José R. Berreyesa and José Reyes Berreyesa
- José de los Santos Berreyesa (1817–1864), alcalde of Sonoma, California

== See also ==
- The José Berreyesa families of California
