= Dunnigan Hills AVA =

Wine-growing region in Yolo County, California

Coordinates: 38°48′31″N 122°00′33″W

Dunnigan Hills
- Wine region
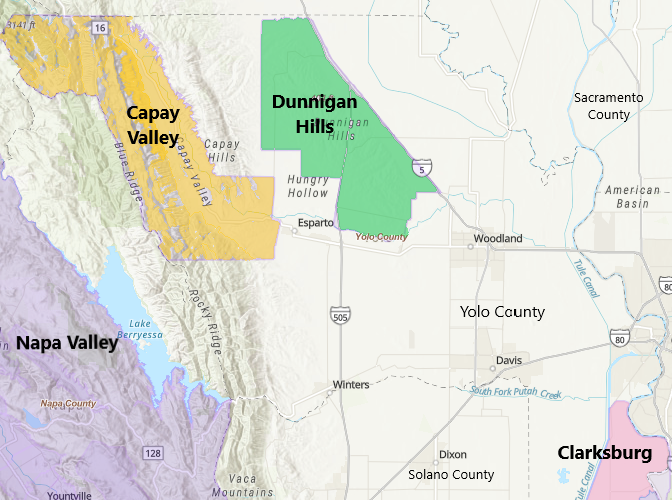
- Type: American Viticultural Area
- Year established: 1993
- Years of wine industry: 165
- Country: United States
- Part of: California, Yolo County
- Other regions in California, Yolo County: Capay Valley AVA, Clarksburg AVA, Merritt Island AVA
- Growing season: 277 days
- Climate region: Region V
- Heat units: 4,450 GDD units
- Precipitation (annual average): 16 to 24 in (410–610 mm)
- Soil conditions: Steep gravelly loams or loams on terraces
- Total area: 89,000 acres (139 sq mi)
- Size of planted vineyards: 1,500+ acres (610+ ha)
- No. of vineyards: 2
- Grapes produced: Cabernet Sauvignon, Chardonnay, Merlot, Petite Sirah, Malbec, Sauvignon blanc, Syrah, Tempranillo, Viognier
- No. of wineries: 2

Dunnigan Hills is an American Viticultural Area (AVA) is located in the Dunnigan Hills, in northwestern Yolo County, California. The wine appellation was established as the nation's 119^{th}, the state's 64^{th} and the county's third AVA by the Bureau of Alcohol, Tobacco and Firearms (ATF), Treasury on May 13, 1993 after reviewing the petition submitted by Ron McClendon, winemaker of R.H. Phillips Vineyards, proposing a viticultural area in Yolo County named "Dunnigan Hills."

The 89,000-acre (139 sq mi) Dunnigan Hills viticultural area is a group of low, rolling hills running in a northwest to southeasterly direction for about 19.5 miles (31.4 km) and at the widest point, the hills are about 10 miles (16 km) wide located in the northwest portion of Yolo County. The wine region has a Mediterranean climate that is less prone to frost than other parts of the Sacramento Valley. The largest winery in Dunnigan Hills was R.H. Phillips with its 1,300-acre (526 ha) estate vineyard among the area's 1,500+ acres (610+ ha) of cultivation. R.H. Phillips was eventually bought by Constellation Brands who relocated the winery facilities to Lodi, 50 miles (80 km) to the south, but still maintains the original vineyards.

== History ==
The area's indigenous population mostly left by the 1860s. The Spanish missions did not settle in this part of the State, nor did Spanish settlers. The first non-native settlers of the area were western Europeans. According to Larkey, the Dunnigan Hills was settled in the 1850s and 1860s by German families who raised grain and livestock. In 1856 a post office was established in the town of Antelope, which was located three miles (4.8 km) south of the Colusa County line, just east of the Dunnigan Hills. In 1853, A.W. Dunnigan settled in Antelope and opened a hotel which was known as Dunnigan's. In 1876 the Northern Railway was extended to Dunnigan's hotel and a town plate was recorded for the town of Dunnigan and a Dunnigan post office was opened. The near-by hills soon were known as the Dunnigan Hills. Grape growing began in the Dunnigan Hills in 1861 when the 450 acres (180 ha) Orleans Hills vineyards was planted by Jacob Knauth. In 1993, there were two wineries and six vineyards cultivating 1,118 acres (452 ha) in the Dunnigan Hills.

== Terroir ==
=== Topography ===
The Dunnigan Hills rise out of a part of the Sacramento Valley which is nearly flat, varying only between 60 and 130 feet (18–40 m) above sea level. In contrast to the surrounding valley floor, the Dunnigan Hills viticultural area consists of low, rolling hills, which rise to an elevation of about 400 feet (120 m) above sea level. The hills are crossed by streams that flow west to east out of the Coast Range. On the west, the Dunnigan Hills drop to an elevation of approximately 250 feet (76 m) before the transition to the steeper, higher slopes of the Coast Range begins. The terrain in the Coast Range rises rapidly to 1,200 and 1,600 feet (370–490 m), with peaks which are even higher.

=== Climate ===
The Dunigan Hills viticultural area is warmer in the summer and winter than the Coast Range highlands to the west. The petitioner states the area is also less prone to frost damage in the spring than the rest of the Sacramento Valley because "the hills and streams provide better air drainage than that found on the valley floor to the north, east and south of the Dunnigan Hills." This air drainage also makes the Dunnigan Hills cooler than the surrounding valley floor in summer. The plant hardiness zones are 9a and 9b.

=== Soil ===
The predominant soils in the viticultural area are the Corning-Hillgate association, well-drained, gently sloping to moderately steep gravelly loams or loams on terraces, and the Sehorn-Balcom association, well-drained, gently sloping to steep silty clay loams and clays over sandstone. Soils outside the area include the Dibble-Millsholm and Positas associations in the foothills of the Coast Range to the west, and the Yolo-Brentwood, Rincon-Marvin-Tehama, Capay-Clear Lake and Willows-Pescadero associations on the valley floor to the north, south and east.
