= Randalls Island (disambiguation) =

Randalls Island is an island conjoined with Wards Island in New York City.

Randalls Island may also refer to:

- Randalls Island (Montana), an island in the Yellowstone River
- Randall Island, in Sacramento County, California
