= Toski =

Toski is a surname. Notable people with the surname include:

- Bob Toski (born 1926), American golfer
- Faton Toski (born 1987), Kosovar football player

== See also ==
- Toskić
