= Rancho Cañada de Capay =

Land Legislative instrument in 1846

Coordinates: 38.700°N 121.960°W

Rancho Cañada de Capay was a 40,079-acre (162.19 km^{2}) Mexican land grant in present-day Yolo County, California given in 1846 by Governor Pío Pico to the three brothers Santiago, Nemicio, and Francisco Berreyesa. "Cañada de Capay" means "valley of the Capay" in Spanish. "Capay" comes from the Southern Wintun Indian word for "stream". The rancho occupied the Capay Valley on both sides of Cache Creek.

== History ==
Pío Pico granted nine square leagues to three Berreyesa brothers: José Catarino Santiago (1815–1856), Joseph Zenobia Nemicio (or Nemesio) (1819–1854), and Francisco Antonio (1824–1856) in 1846. Their father, José de los Reyes Berreyesa, who was the grantee of Rancho San Vicente, was killed by John C. Frémont's men in 1846. Francisco Berreyesa was also the grantee of Rancho Rincon de Musalacon in 1846.

Jasper O'Farrell purchased seven and a half leagues (about 33,400 acres (135.2 km^{2})) from the Berreyesa brothers in 1847, and Charles Hoppe purchased one and a half leagues (later known as the Hoppe tract) from the Berreyesa brothers. Hoppe sold the land to Henry Lawrence, who in 1851 sold it to John D. Stephens and his brother George Dickson Stephens, in partnership with John S. Jury and John Q. Adams. In 1854, Nemicio Berreyesa was lynched by masked men while he was guarding the family lands at night, and in 1856, Francisco Berreyesa was murdered in his home in Santa Clara, now known as the Berryessa Adobe.

With the cession of California to the United States following the Mexican-American War, the 1848 Treaty of Guadalupe Hidalgo provided that the land grants would be honored. As required by the Land Act of 1851, a claim for Rancho Cañada de Capay was filed with the Public Land Commission in 1852, and the grant was patented to O'Farrell, John S. Jury, and John D. Stephens in 1865.

O'Farrell sold an undivided half of the seven and one-half leagues to banker John Milton Rhodes and his business partner, Francis W.Fratt, in 1853. In 1858, Sylvanus Arnold and John Gillig, both Sacramento merchants purchased the other half of the grant. Gillig planted grain, grapevines, and fruit trees and established Yolo County's first winery in 1860. The Arnold and Gillig tract includes the town of Capay. The Hoppe tract includes the towns of Esparto and Madison.

== See also ==
- Berreyesa family
