= Toskić =

Origin
- Language: Serbo-Croatian
- Meaning: matronymic derived from Toska, diminutive of Teodosija and Teodora; Albanian ethnic subgroup of Tosks, according to Halil Bicaj

Toskić (Serbian Cyrillic: Тоскић) is a South-Slavic surname. It may be a matronymic derived from Toska, a diminutive of Teodosija and Teodora. According to Halil Bicaj, this surname is derived from Albanian ethnic subgroup of Tosks.

== Notable people ==
- Alem Toskić (born 1982), Serbian handballer
- Idriz Toskić (born 1995), Montenegrin footballer

== Families ==
Families with the surname live in Serbia:

- Aleksandrovac, Orthodox. The Toskić family in Tuleš, Aleksandrovac, were originally named Todorović, and their slava is that of St. George (Đurđevdan).
- Kruševac, Orthodox.
- Priboj, Muslim

and Montenegro:

- Kolašin
- Bar
- Gusinje

Bosnia and Herzegovina

- Vitina, Ljubuški

they emigrated from 1893 to 1934 from the town of Bar in Montenegro

== See also ==
- Toskići, settlement in Serbia
- Tosković, surname
