= Dunnigan Hills =

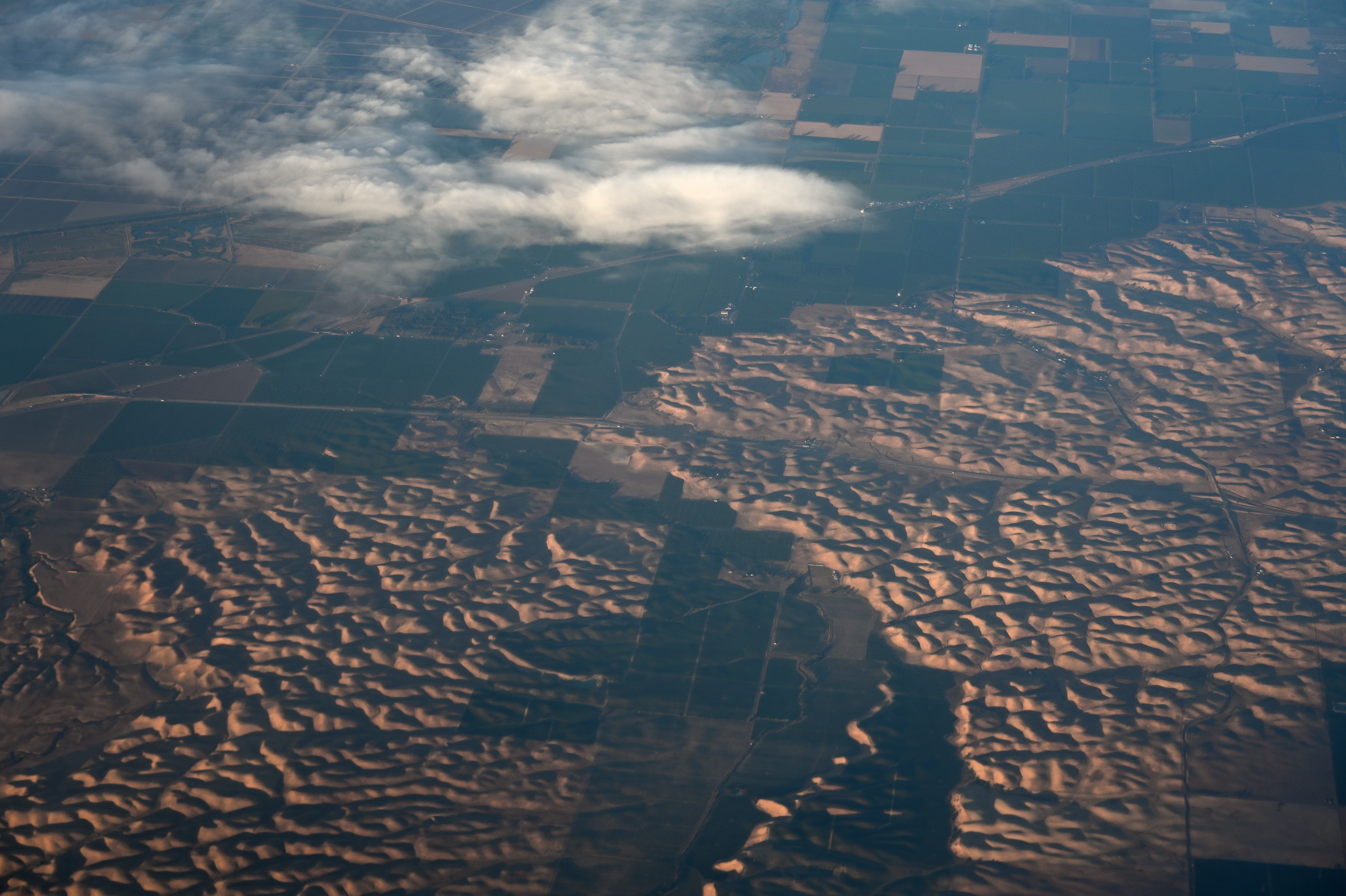
- An aerial photo of the Dunnigan Hills in 2022

Highest point
- Elevation: 87 m (285 ft)

Geography
- Location within California Location within the United States
- Country: United States
- State: California
- District: Yolo County
- Range coordinates: 38°47′39.646″N 121°57′18.888″W
- Topo map: USGS Zamora

The Dunnigan Hills are a low mountain range in northern Yolo County, California.

The Dunnigan Hills AVA is in the northwestern area.

Mitigated by mild Sacramento River delta breezes, the Dunnigan Hills have a mediterranean climate.
