= Rancho Los Capitancillos =

Mexican land grant in California

Coordinates: 37.200°N 121.880°W

Rancho Los Capitancillos was a 3,360-acre (13.6 km^{2}) Mexican land grant in present-day Santa Clara County, California given in 1842 by Governor Juan B. Alvarado to Justo Larios. Los Capitancillos means the Little Captains in Spanish.

The grant was south of present-day San Jose and was bounded on the south by José de los Reyes Berreyesa's Rancho San Vicente.

== History ==
Justo Larios (1808–), son of Jose Larios, was a military artilleryman at the Presidio of San Francisco. Larios was granted the one square league Rancho Los Capitancillos in 1842. Larios sold the whole grant to Grove C. Cook (–1852) in 1845. In 1848, Cook sold the northern part of the grant (Rancho Cañada de los Capitancillos) to the Guadalupe Mining Company. Cook died in 1852, and Charles Fossat bought the three-quarters of the grant in a sheriff's sale.

With the cession of California to the United States following the Mexican-American War, the 1848 Treaty of Guadalupe Hidalgo provided that the land grants would be honored. As required by the Land Act of 1851, a claim for Rancho Los Capitancillos was filed with the Public Land Commission in 1852. The grant was confirmed by the Commission 1854, by the US District Court in 1857, but reversed by the US Supreme Court, and then approved. The grant was patented to Charles Fossat in 1865.

The New Almaden Quicksilver Mines were discovered in 1845, and mining operations began in 1847, just in time for the California Gold Rush. José Reyes Berreyessa laid claim to the mine on the basis that it lay on Rancho San Vicente. Similarly, Justo Larios also claimed ownership. The United States government even stepped in to claim that the mine lay on public land. A complex legal case described by The New York Times as "one of the most remarkable civil trials in this or any other country", United States v. Andres Castillero eventually reached the United States Supreme Court whereupon it was finally decided in 1862 that, the mine was on Rancho Los Capitancillos, and that the furnaces and improvements of the company below the hill were on Rancho San Vicente. The company bought into these two titles and then sold the entire operation in 1864 to the Quicksilver Mining Company.

== See also ==
- Ranchos of Santa Clara County, California
