= José de los Santos Berreyesa =

- Born: April 28, 1817; San Francisco
- Died: October 30, 1864 (aged 47); Martinez, California
- Citizenship: Mexican
- Parent: José de los Reyes Berryessa

José de los Santos Berreyesa (April 28, 1817 – October 30, 1864), a member of the Berreyesa family, was the last Alcalde of Alta California. Fluent to a high degree in both English and Spanish, he served as a witness on many land grant cases before the Public Land Commission in the 1850s and 1860s.

== Life ==
José de los Santos Berreyesa was born in Yerba Buena (present day San Francisco) in northern Alta California of Mexico. He was the sixth child and fourth son of José de los Reyes Berreyesa.

Berreyesa served as the alcalde at the Mexican Presidio of Sonoma. In 1846, while alcalde and during the Bear Flag Revolt, he was jailed with two of his brothers by American John C. Frémont. When his father traveled up to see how his three sons were being treated in jail, the father and two cousins, twin sons of Francisco de Haro, were shot and killed in San Rafael by a group of three men, including Kit Carson, who was assigned the task by Frémont. The dead were stripped of their belongings, and left for Mission Indians to bury. When Berreyesa asked whether his father had been killed, Frémont said it might have been a man named Castro. A soldier of Frémont's was seen wearing the father's serape, and Frémont refused to assist Berreyesa in retrieving it as a final token of his father to give to his mother. The three Berreyesa brothers resorted to buying the serape from the soldier for the extortionate price of $25 (equivalent to $900 in 2025). Later, Carson told Jasper O'Farrell that he regretted killing the Californios, but that the act was only one such that Frémont ordered him to commit.

Family

Berreyesa married Francisca Ignacis Martínez (1824–1907), a twin daughter of Ygnacio Martínez. The couple had four sons and two daughters between 1848 and 1856.

Rancho Mallacomes

Berreyesa received the 17,742-acre (72 km^{2}) Mexican land grant of Rancho Mallacomes from Governor Manuel Micheltorena in 1843. It was located in the Napa Valley, within present day in Napa County, California. After the U.S. statehood of California (1850), as required by the Land Act of 1851, a claim for Rancho Mallacomes was filed by Berreyesa in 1852 with the Public Land Commission. 12,540 acres (50.7 km^{2}) was patented by the U.S. to his estate in 1873.

José de los Santos Berreyesa died in Martinez, California on October 30, 1864.

== See also ==
- Berryessa family of California
