= Pirkle Jones =

American photographer

- Born: January 2, 1914; Shreveport, Louisiana
- Died: March 15, 2009 (aged 95)
- Education: California School of Fine Arts
- Known for: Documentary photography

Pirkle Jones (January 2, 1914 – March 15, 2009) was an American documentary photographer and educator.

== Biography ==
Pirkle Jones was born in Shreveport, Louisiana. His first experience with photography was when he bought a Kodak Brownie at the age of seventeen. In the 1930s, his photographs were featured in pictorialist salons and publications. He served four years in the army during World War II in the 37th division and went to the Fiji Islands, New Georgia, Guadalcanal, and the Philippines.

After the war, Jones entered the first class in photography offered by the California School of Fine Arts. There he met the artists and instructors that helped him develop his talents: Ansel Adams, Minor White, Edward Weston, and Dorothea Lange. Jones worked as Ansel Adams' assistant for six years, and the two photographers forged a lifelong friendship.

Dorothea Lange came to him in 1956 with an idea to collaborate on a photographic essay entitled "Death of a Valley". The essay chronicled the death of the town of Monticello, California in the Berryessa Valley, which disappeared when the Monticello Dam was completed. The photographs were taken in the last year of its existence. Jones later described the project with Lange as "one of the most meaningful photographic experiences of [his] life".

Jones also took part in numerous collaborations with photographer and wife, Ruth-Marion Baruch, over the course of their 49-year marriage, including Illusion For Sale, and a series on the hippies of Haight-Ashbury.

In 1968, Ruth-Marion introduced herself to Kathleen Cleaver, wife of famous Black Panther Eldridge Cleaver, and spoke of her interest in the Black Panthers and their portrayal by the media. It was her desire to present a balanced view that inspired Jones and Baruch to photograph the Panthers from July to October 1968 in the San Francisco Bay Area.

Jones was the recipient of an honorary doctorate from the San Francisco Art Institute, where he taught until 1994. One of his students was Geraldine Sharpe.

In 2016, the Marin Community Foundation donated the Pirkle Jones and Ruth-Marion Baruch Collection to the University of California, Santa Cruz. The collection, an archive of photographs documenting the people, landscape, and politics of California in the mid-20th century, was the largest single gift in the university's history, with an estimated value of $32 million.
