= Cloverdale, California =

City in California, United States

- City
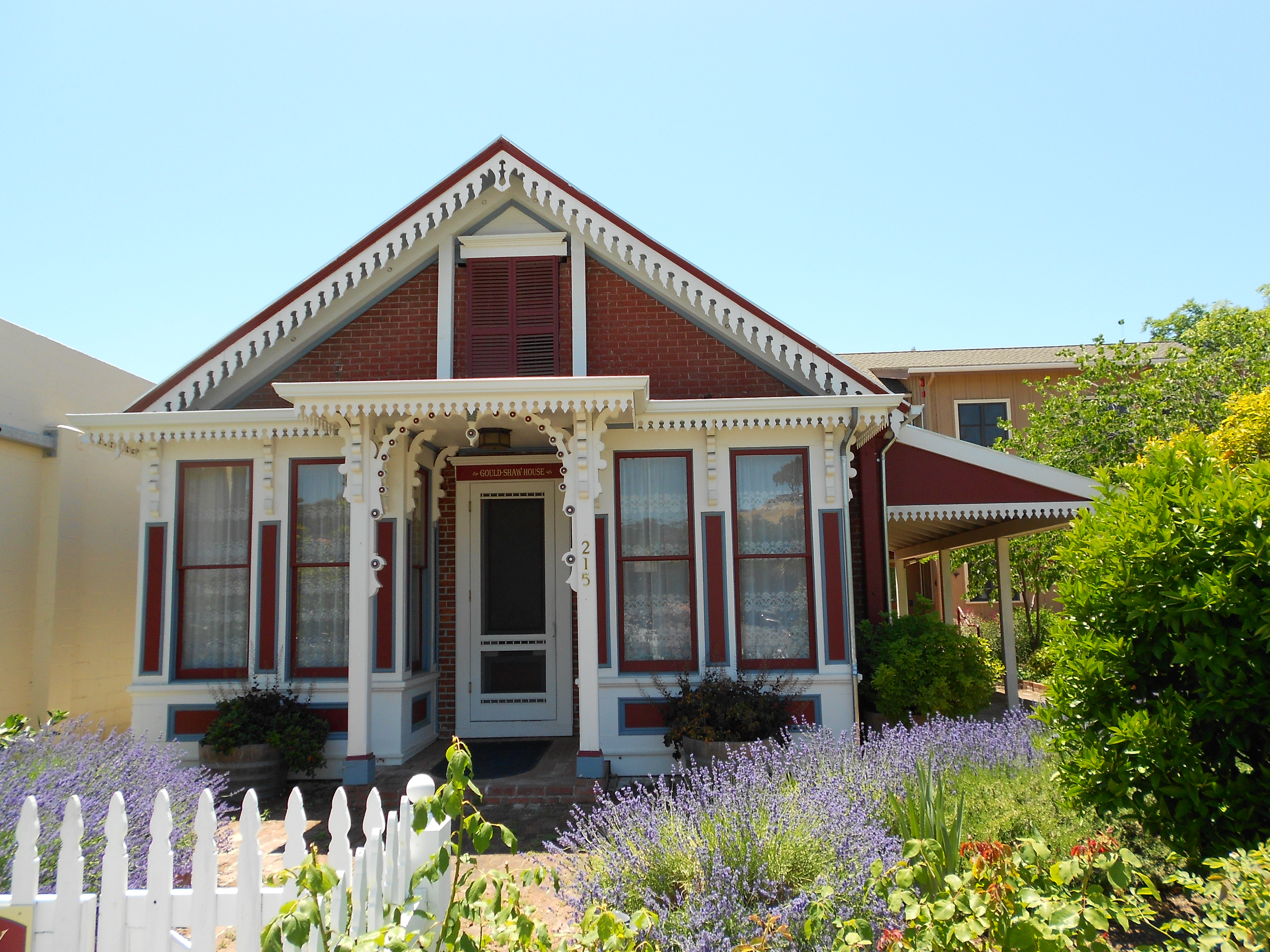
- The Gould-Shaw House, a historic house in Cloverdale, is listed on the National Register of Historic Places.

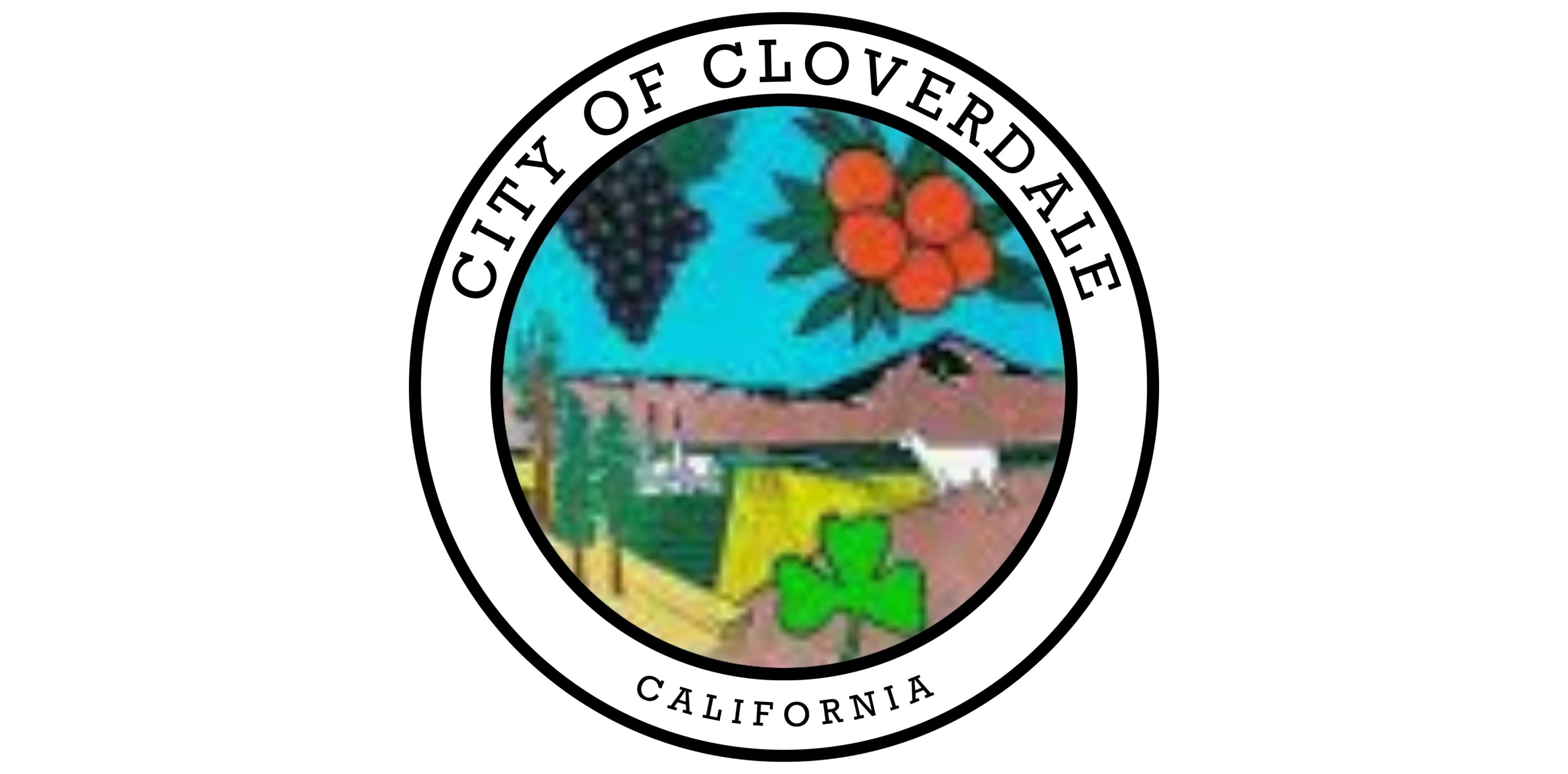
- Flag
- Interactive map of Cloverdale, California
- Location in the United States
- Coordinates: 38°47′57″N 123°1′2″W
- Country: United States
- State: California
- County: Sonoma
- Incorporated: February 28, 1872

Government
  - Type: Council–manager

Area
  - Total: 3.14 sq mi (8.12 km^{2})
  - Land: 3.14 sq mi (8.12 km^{2})
  - Water: 0 sq mi (0.00 km^{2}) 0%
- Elevation: 335 ft (102 m)

Population (2020)
  - Total: 8,996
  - Density: 2,869.2/sq mi (1,107.82/km^{2})
- Demonym: Cloverdalian
- Time zone: UTC-8 (PST)
  - Summer (DST): UTC-7 (PDT)
- ZIP code: 95425
- Area code: 707
- FIPS code: 06-14190
- GNIS feature IDs: 277489, 2409487
- Website: cloverdale.net

Cloverdale is a city in Sonoma County, California, United States; it is both the westernmost and the northernmost city in the San Francisco Bay Area. The San Francisco and North Pacific Railroad reached the area in 1872. The Cloverdale Rancheria of Pomo Indians of California is headquartered there. The population was 8,996 at the 2020 census.

== History ==
Cloverdale began as an early stagecoach stop, known as Markleville, on the Rancho Rincon de Musalacon Mexican grant. In 1856, R.B. Markle and W.J. Miller bought 759 acres (3.1 km^{2}), which included the present site of the town, from Johnson Horrell. In 1859, James Abram Kleiser bought Markle's interest, and the town was laid out. The town was incorporated when the San Francisco and North Pacific Railroad arrived in 1872. By 1878, the railroad service provided three trains a day between Cloverdale and Ferries of San Francisco Bay.

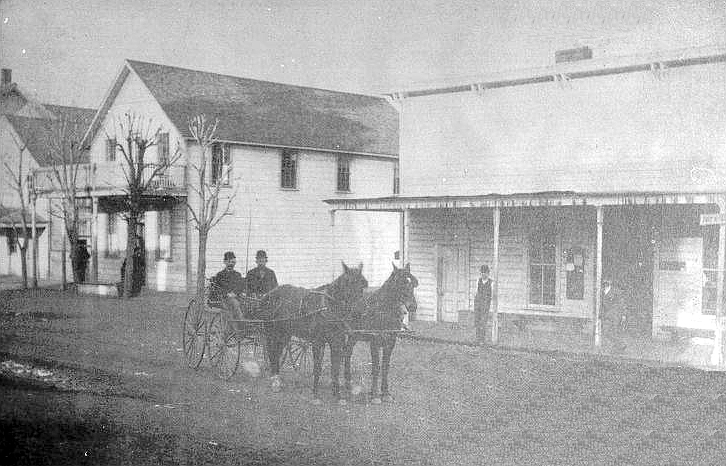
Cloverdale's first post office (c. 1871–1880)

In 1881, Jules Leroux and Armand Dehay established a colony south of Cloverdale named "Icaria Speranza", based on the French Utopian movement, the Icarians. The settlement ended in 1886 and today, there is a marker south of town where the schoolhouse was located.

Cloverdale Citrus Fair began in 1892.

The San Francisco Chronicle Wine Competition is run by the Cloverdale Citrus Fair. Since 2000, the San Francisco Chronicle has been its title sponsor.

Cloverdale suffered severe economic hardship, losing 500 to 600 manufacturing jobs between 1988 and 1994, with the closing of a fire equipment factory and the shrinking of the logging industry. On July 6, 2005, Cloverdale began its economic reform with the "RTB" (Real-Estate Transfer Bureau) plan granting money for businesses and commerce to return to the city. This plan fell through as the grant was moved to Los Altos, California and changed to the "1750" plan. In 1993, 300 jobs were eliminated alone when Louisiana-Pacific closed its lumber mill. In 1994, Highway 101, which formerly bisected the town, was rerouted around town with a bypass. Some businesses closed, and many natives believed the bypass radically changed the town's character.

Since the bypass, signs of civic revival have occurred with the development of pedestrian-friendly sidewalks, a performing arts center, a brewpub, and a downtown plaza hosting live concerts and a farmers' market. In 1997, Clover Springs, a development with 362 houses, was opened on the south end of town. In 2011, the Sonoma County Agricultural Preservation and Open Space District transferred 250 acres (1.0 km^{2}) of former ranchland to the City of Cloverdale for use as a park and open-space preserve.

== Cloverdale Rancheria of Pomo Indians ==
The Cloverdale Rancheria of Pomo Indians is a landless federally recognized tribe with a membership of almost 500. In 2008, the Tribe acquired 80 acres (320,000 m^{2}) at the southern end of town.

The Rancheria is a community of Pomo Indians who are indigenous to Sonoma County and speak the Southern Pomo language. Pomo people are renowned for their basket weaving, done by both men and women. Elsie Allen, considered to be one of the best California basketweavers of her generation, was a member of the Rancheria and spent part of her childhood there.

According to tribal history, the Pomo people lived peacefully in the area since ancient times. The Rancheria was created by the federal government in 1921, when the tribe became federally recognized, and deeded the tribe 27.5 acres (111,000 m^{2}) on the southern edge of town.

In 1958, the Rancheria was terminated, along with 43 other rancherias in California. This process transferred tribal community land to private ownership.

In 1979, Tillie Hardwick, a Pomo woman, filed a class action suit on behalf of 16 of the illegally terminated rancherias. In 1983, the Courts reinstated the federal recognition of the illegally terminated tribes, including the Cloverdale Rancheria.

In 1994, the Highway 101 bypass cut through the Rancheria land, forcing tribal landowners to sell their property for the freeway.

In 2006, the tribe began efforts to revive and restore their traditional culture. The tribe is also interested in opening up a casino.

== Geography ==
Cloverdale is located in the northern portion of Sonoma County, approximately 85 miles (135 km) north of San Francisco; it is both the northernmost and westernmost city of the San Francisco Bay Area.

The city has a total area of 2.6 square miles (6.7 km^{2}), all land.

Cloverdale is located in Wine Country, being part of the Alexander Valley AVA.

=== Climate ===
According to the Köppen Climate Classification system, Cloverdale has a hot-summer Mediterranean climate, abbreviated "Csa" on climate maps. Temperatures in Cloverdale can exceed 100 °F (38 °C) and it is known for having hot, dry summers relative to the rest of Sonoma County.

Climate data for Cloverdale, California (1991–2020 normals, extremes 1950–present)
Month	Jan	Feb	Mar	Apr	May	Jun	Jul	Aug	Sep	Oct	Nov	Dec	Year
Record high °F (°C)	85 (29)	86 (30)	91 (33)	102 (39)	107 (42)	116 (47)	115 (46)	114 (46)	116 (47)	106 (41)	95 (35)	83 (28)	116 (47)
Mean maximum °F (°C)	69.9 (21.1)	75.0 (23.9)	82.4 (28.0)	89.9 (32.2)	96.1 (35.6)	105.0 (40.6)	106.3 (41.3)	105.5 (40.8)	102.9 (39.4)	94.8 (34.9)	79.6 (26.4)	68.1 (20.1)	109.2 (42.9)
Mean daily maximum °F (°C)	59.8 (15.4)	63.4 (17.4)	68.1 (20.1)	73.8 (23.2)	81.5 (27.5)	89.4 (31.9)	94.4 (34.7)	93.1 (33.9)	89.8 (32.1)	80.6 (27.0)	66.8 (19.3)	58.7 (14.8)	76.6 (24.8)
Daily mean °F (°C)	49.1 (9.5)	51.8 (11.0)	55.2 (12.9)	59.3 (15.2)	65.7 (18.7)	71.9 (22.2)	74.8 (23.8)	74.0 (23.3)	71.7 (22.1)	64.8 (18.2)	54.6 (12.6)	48.2 (9.0)	61.8 (16.6)
Mean daily minimum °F (°C)	38.3 (3.5)	40.2 (4.6)	42.4 (5.8)	44.9 (7.2)	49.8 (9.9)	54.4 (12.4)	55.2 (12.9)	54.8 (12.7)	53.6 (12.0)	48.9 (9.4)	42.3 (5.7)	37.7 (3.2)	46.9 (8.3)
Mean minimum °F (°C)	29.3 (−1.5)	31.6 (−0.2)	34.4 (1.3)	36.2 (2.3)	42.4 (5.8)	47.5 (8.6)	50.2 (10.1)	50.9 (10.5)	47.1 (8.4)	41.1 (5.1)	33.0 (0.6)	28.5 (−1.9)	26.9 (−2.8)
Record low °F (°C)	21 (−6)	21 (−6)	29 (−2)	30 (−1)	33 (1)	36 (2)	41 (5)	42 (6)	38 (3)	32 (0)	26 (−3)	17 (−8)	17 (−8)
Average precipitation inches (mm)	8.11 (206)	8.06 (205)	5.69 (145)	2.53 (64)	1.51 (38)	0.30 (7.6)	0.01 (0.25)	0.05 (1.3)	0.13 (3.3)	1.84 (47)	4.69 (119)	8.81 (224)	41.73 (1,060)
Average precipitation days	13.1	11.3	10.5	7.5	4.5	1.0	0.1	0.2	0.9	3.8	8.3	12.2	73.4
Source: NOAA

== Demographics ==
Historical population

Year	Pop.	±%
1880	430	—
1890	763	+77.4%
1900	750	−1.7%
1910	823	+9.7%
1920	718	−12.8%
1930	759	+5.7%
1940	809	+6.6%
1950	1,292	+59.7%

Year	Pop.	±%
1960	2,848	+120.4%
1970	3,251	+14.2%
1980	3,989	+22.7%
1990	4,924	+23.4%
2000	6,831	+38.7%
2010	8,618	+26.2%
2020	8,996	+4.4%

U.S. Decennial Census
1860–1870 1880-1890
1900 1910 1920
1930 1940 1950
1960 1970 1980
1990 2000 2010
2020

=== 2020 census ===
As of the 2020 census, Cloverdale had a population of 8,996 and a population density of 2,869.5 inhabitants per square mile (1,107.9/km^{2}).

Racial composition as of the 2020 census
Race	Number	Percent
White	5,230	58.1%
Black or African American	69	0.8%
American Indian and Alaska Native	287	3.2%
Asian	100	1.1%
Native Hawaiian and Other Pacific Islander	17	0.2%
Some other race	1,839	20.4%
Two or more races	1,454	16.2%
Hispanic or Latino (of any race)	3,470	38.6%

There were 3,365 households, of which 32.5% included children under the age of 18. Of all households, 52.9% were married-couple households, 7.0% were cohabiting couple households, 24.8% had a female householder with no spouse or partner present, and 15.3% had a male householder with no spouse or partner present. About 24.1% of households were one person, and 13.5% were one person aged 65 or older. The average household size was 2.65, and there were 2,325 families (69.1% of all households).

The census reported that 99.3% of the population lived in households, 0.1% lived in non-institutionalized group quarters, and 0.7% were institutionalized. Additionally, 99.8% of residents lived in urban areas, while 0.2% lived in rural areas.

The age distribution was 21.3% under the age of 18, 7.5% aged 18 to 24, 25.5% aged 25 to 44, 24.8% aged 45 to 64, and 20.9% who were 65 years of age or older. The median age was 41.8 years. For every 100 females, there were 97.9 males, and for every 100 females age 18 and over there were 95.6 males age 18 and over.

There were 3,524 housing units at an average density of 1,047.9 units per square mile (404.6 units/km^{2}), of which 95.5% were occupied and 4.5% were vacant. Of the occupied units, 64.7% were owner-occupied and 35.3% were occupied by renters. The homeowner vacancy rate was 0.9% and the rental vacancy rate was 3.2%.

=== Income and poverty ===
In 2023, the US Census Bureau estimated that the median household income was $104,238, and the per capita income was $49,562. About 2.6% of families and 4.5% of the population were below the poverty line.

=== 2010 census ===
At the 2010 census Cloverdale had a population of 8,618. The population density was 3,255.1 inhabitants per square mile (1,256.8/km^{2}). The racial makeup of Cloverdale was 6,458 (74.9%) White, 48 (0.6%) African American, 156 (1.8%) Native American, 98 (1.1%) Asian, 7 (0.1%) Pacific Islander, 1,530 (17.8%) from other races, and 321 (3.7%) from two or more races. Hispanic or Latino of any race were 2,824 persons (32.8%).

The census reported that 8,530 people (99.0% of the population) lived in households, 22 (0.3%) lived in non-institutionalized group quarters, and 66 (0.8%) were institutionalized.

There were 3,182 households, 1,087 (34.2%) had children under the age of 18 living in them, 1,769 (55.6%) were opposite-sex married couples living together, 294 (9.2%) had a female householder with no husband present, 159 (5.0%) had a male householder with no wife present. There were 232 (7.3%) unmarried opposite-sex partnerships, and 32 (1.0%) same-sex married couples or partnerships. 747 households (23.5%) were one person and 373 (11.7%) had someone living alone who was 65 or older. The average household size was 2.68. There were 2,222 families (69.8% of households); the average family size was 3.16.

The age distribution was 2,054 people (23.8%) under the age of 18, 699 people (8.1%) aged 18 to 24, 2,154 people (25.0%) aged 25 to 44, 2,329 people (27.0%) aged 45 to 64, and 1,382 people (16.0%) who were 65 or older. The median age was 39.7 years. For every 100 females, there were 99.5 males. For every 100 females age 18 and over, there were 96.1 males.

There were 3,427 housing units at an average density of 1,294.4 per square mile, of the occupied units 2,102 (66.1%) were owner-occupied and 1,080 (33.9%) were rented. The homeowner vacancy rate was 4.1%; the rental vacancy rate was 4.9%. 5,522 people (64.1% of the population) lived in owner-occupied housing units and 3,008 people (34.9%) lived in rental housing units.

== Government ==
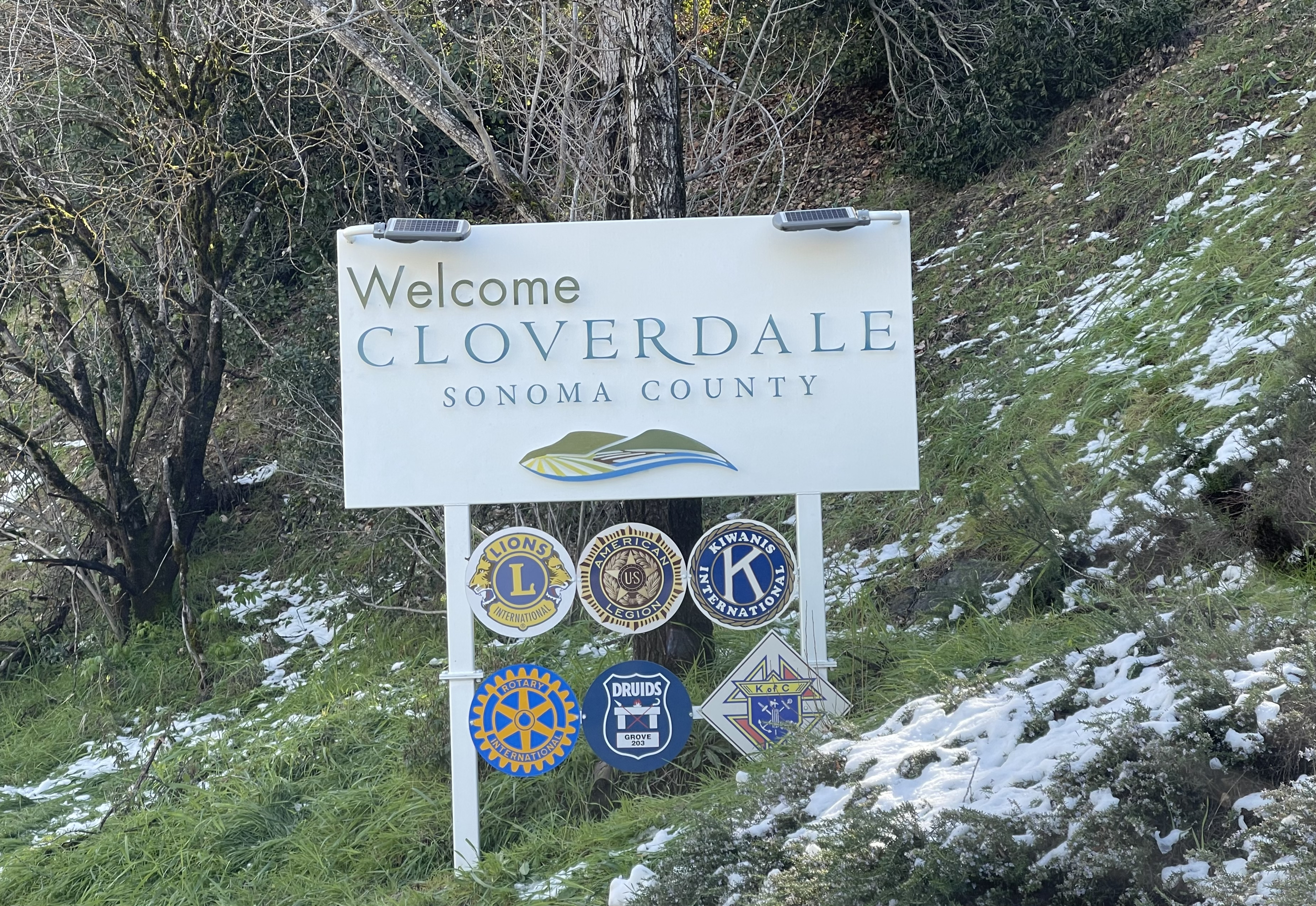
Welcome to Cloverdale.

In the California State Legislature, Cloverdale is in the 2nd senatorial district, represented by Democrat Mike McGuire, and in the 2nd Assembly district, represented by Democrat Chris Rogers.

In the United States House of Representatives, Cloverdale is in California's 2nd congressional district, represented by Democrat Jared Huffman.

According to the California Secretary of State, as of February 10, 2019, Cloverdale has 4,745 registered voters. Of those, 2,293 (48.3%) are registered Democrats, 994 (20.9%) are registered Republicans, and 1,194 (25.2%) have declined to state a political party.

== Infrastructure ==
=== Transportation ===
Cloverdale is at the junction of U.S. 101 and State Route 128. The city operates Cloverdale Transit and Cloverdale Municipal Airport. Inter-city transit is provided by Sonoma County Transit.

Plans to extend Sonoma–Marin Area Rail Transit (SMART), a commuter rail service in Sonoma and Marin counties, from its current northern terminus in Windsor, California to Cloverdale will link the town to a bay ferry terminal in Larkspur. A train station for this purpose already exists on the town's south side. Long range County plans include eventually extending the SMART train to Cloverdale.

== Education ==
The school district is Cloverdale Unified School District.

== Notable people ==
- Elsie Allen (1899–1990), Pomo basket maker and teacher regarded as one of the three best California basket makers of her generation
- Fairuza Balk (born 1974), actress, musician, and visual artist; she lived in Cloverdale as an infant
- Lana Clarkson (1962–2003), actress murdered by music producer Phil Spector; she grew up in Cloverdale
- David Del Tredici (born 1937), Pulitzer Prize-winning 20th and 21st century classical music composer; he was born and spent the first four years of his life in Cloverdale
- Rich Rowland (born 1964), former catcher for the Detroit Tigers

== See also ==
- Northwestern Pacific Railroad
