= Cloverdale Transit =

Local bus route in Cloverdale, California, US

Cloverdale Transit is a local bus route operated by Sonoma County Transit serving the city of Cloverdale, California.

Sonoma County Transit operates the weekday-only service as Route 68, also known as the Cloverdale Shuttle. Local 68 follows a loop route that serves the Furber Ranch Shopping Center, South Cloverdale Boulevard, and downtown Cloverdale.

Cloverdale Station is scheduled to connect to Sonoma-Marin Area Rail Transit (SMART) in 2027.
