= Clarksburg AVA =

Wine-growing region in California, U.S.

Coordinates: 38°25′35″N 121°31′57″W

Clarksburg
- Wine region
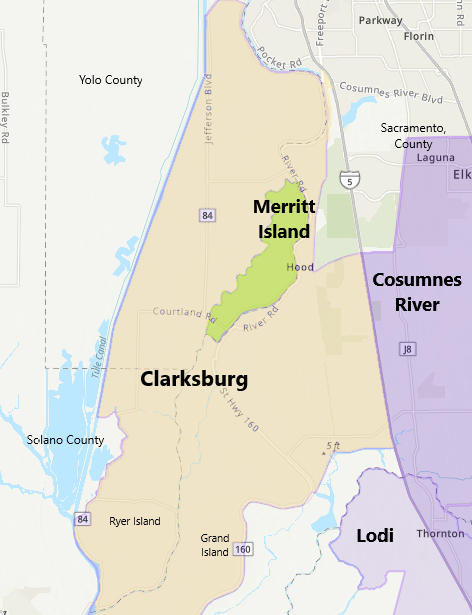
- Type: American Viticultural Area
- Year established: 1984; 2022 Expansion
- Years of wine industry: 63
- Country: United States
- Part of: California, Sacramento County, Solano County, Yolo County
- Sub-regions: Merritt Island AVA
- Growing season: 281 days
- Climate region: Region IV
- Heat units: 3,525 GDD units
- Precipitation (annual average): 18 in (460 mm)
- Soil conditions: Poorly drained clay and clay loam
- Total area: 64,640 acres (101 sq mi); 92,585 acres (145 sq mi) (2022)
- Size of planted vineyards: 10,000+ acres (4,000+ ha)
- No. of vineyards: 15
- Grapes produced: Albarino, Cabernet Sauvignon, Chardonnay, Chenin Blanc, Gewurztraminer, Grenache blanc, Malvasia, Merlot, Orange Muscat, Petite Sirah, Pinot gris, Riesling, Sauvignon blanc, Syrah, Tempranillo, Verdelho, Viognier
- No. of wineries: 17

Clarksburg is an American Viticultural Area (AVA) in California's Sacramento Valley spanning across portions of Sacramento, Solano and Yolo Counties. Lying southwest of the state capital of Sacramento, the wine appellation was established as the nation's 57th and the state's 37th AVA on January 23, 1984, by the Bureau of Alcohol, Tobacco and Firearms (ATF), Treasury after reviewing the petition submitted by John Baranek of Clarksburg Vintners & Growers proposing the viticultural area within Yolo, Solano and Sacramento Counties known as "Clarksburg."

The sixteen-mile-long (26 km) by eight-mile-wide (13 km) viticultural area encompasses 64,640 acres (101 sq mi) and named after the town of Clarksburg, located in its northern section. The growing region has dense clay, silt, and loam soils. Fog and cool breezes from San Francisco Bay keeps Clarksburg AVA cooler than Sacramento. At the outset, Clarksburg contained two bonded wineries and 25 vineyards cultivating approximately 10,000 acres (4,000 ha) of Vitis vinifera. While the Clarksburg appellation produces over 40,000 tons of grapes annually, 90% of the grapes grown in the AVA are processed in winery facilities located elsewhere in California, and relatively few wines are released with the Clarksburg AVA on their labels. The established Merritt Island viticultural area became a sub-appellation within Clarksburg AVA. The plant hardiness zone is 9b.
In 2022, the Alcohol and Tobacco Tax and Trade Bureau (TTB) approved the petition submitted by James Reamer of Reamer Farms Vineyard, on behalf of himself and other wine industry members, to expand the Clarksburg viticultural area by approximately 27,945 acres (44 sq mi) in Sacramento and Solano counties totaling 92,585 acres (145 sq mi).
The expansion area was adjacent to the AVA's southern boundary entirely encompassing both Grand and Ryer Islands which defined the added acreage. There was 350 acres (140 ha) being cultivated on Grand Island and three vineyards on Ryer Island. The soil, climate, topography and hardiness zone in the expansion area are similar to the established Clarksburg AVA.

== History ==
The Spanish began sending expeditions into the Sacramento River Delta Region in 1772. Their passage left no mark on the area but the arrival of John A. Sutter in 1839 certainly did. The presence of European and American settlers introduced widespread ranching and agricultural activity to the region. The huge influx of settlers after the Bear Flag Revolt, and the discovery of gold in 1849, led to the founding of Clarksburg and many other towns in the Sacramento River Delta Region. Clarksburg was named for a respected lawyer from Ohio, Judge Robert C. Clark, who is credited with having the first peach orchard in Yolo County. The earliest record of vineyard activity, circa 1870, was near Courtland located on the east bank of the Sacramento River eight miles (13 km) north of Walnut Grove and about eighteen miles (29 km) south of Sacramento. A steamer landing was established here in 1870 by James V. Sirns, a one time miner who turned to farming. He was one of the first to grow grapes commercially in California. The following year, a wharf was built. The California Pacific Railroad Co. steamers made regular landings and the town was a shipping port for the fruit growing areas.
In the early 1900s many Italian settlers established small vineyards throughout the area, the grapes used to make wine for home consumption. The Clarksburg Area was recognized in the late 1950s as having a favorable climate and soil for growing wine grapes. The first commercial vineyard within the area was established in 1963 by the Herzog Co. in the Pearson District near the town of Courtland. The first wineries were established in 1979; Bogle Vineyards and R:J. Cook located along Elk Slough south of Clarksburg. In 1983, Cook's wines were distributed in twenty-two states and two countries, Canada and Sweden. The number of growers expanded to fourteen and approximately 2,300 acres (930 ha) of Vitis vinifera wine grapes cultivated. A Clarksburg Chenin Blanc won a medal in four major competitions in 1981, including the Orange and Los Angeles County Fairs. Excerpts from articles that appeared in Vintage Magazine, Robert Finigan's Private Guide to Wines, and Bon Appétit magazine, indicate that the viticultural area is locally and nationally known. Each year more growers want to plant grapes as more wineries are interested in their product. In addition to Bogle and Cook, other wineries that source Clarksburg wine grapes are Grand Cru Vineyard, Sebastiani Vineyards and Hacienda Wine Cellars in the Sonoma Valley; LeBay Cellars in Sonoma County's Alexander Valley; J. Lohr Winery of Santa Clara; Amador Foothill Winery of the Shenandoah Valley in Amador County; Robert Mondavi, Charles Krug and Christian Brothers of the Napa Valley; Wente Brothers and Concannon Vineyards of the Livermore Valley; E & J Gallo of Modesto and many others.

== Terroir ==
=== Topography ===
The Clarksburg viticultural area consists of delta lands. These lands are mostly islands surrounded by rivers and/or sloughs, but two sections of the lands are bordered by water on only three sides, (Stone Lakes Area and Glanville). The Sacramento River, the waterway carrying the greatest volume of water in the Delta, and the sloughs connected to it are the unifying hydrologic features of the Clarksburg viticultural area. The sloughs of the viticultural area include Babel, Elk, Duck, Miner, Snodgrass, Steamboat, and Sutter. Perhaps just as important a delineator is the Sacramento River Deep Water Ship Channel constructed on the west side of the Clarksburg viticulture area. The Sacramento River and network of connecting sloughs are sources of high quality irrigation water for vineyards within the current, as well as the expanded Clarksburg viticultural areas. The vast majority of vineyards are drip irrigated, but a few are furrow irrigated.
The delta formed towards the end of the last Ice Age, about 10,000 years ago, as rising seawaters led to the accumulation of sediments behind the Carquinez Strait, which was the only connection between the Central Valley and the Suisun, San Pablo, and San Francisco Bays. The combination of the narrowness of the straits and the tidal action of bay waters restricted river flows and promoted sediment accumulation. The main channels of the Sacramento River and San Joaquin River join a short distance east of Suisun Bay. The Sacramento-San Joaquin Delta developed almost entirely behind the juncture of these two rivers. The flow of the Sacramento River, being much greater than that of the San Joaquin and its tributaries, provided sediments for the Sacramento River portion of the greater Sacramento San Joaquin Delta. These sediments underlie both the current and expanded Clarksburg viticultural areas.

Early in its development, while seawater was rapidly rising, the Sacramento River delta consisted of shifting channels, alluvial fans, and flood plains. As the rate of rising seawater slowed, wetland plants took hold and trapped sediment, resulting in the high organic matter content typical of delta soils. After the 1850s, hydraulic mining debris accumulated along channels and penetrated inland through levee openings.

Delta islands regularly flooded, with those furthest downstream flooding daily during high tides and the entire delta periodically flooding during spring tides and river floods. Prior to reclamation, delta islands had, in general, saucer-like profiles, with marshy interiors flanked by natural levees that varied in height between about 1 foot and 8 feet, as well as in width. The island interiors, however, were not entirely flat, but included alluvial ridges and banks of tidal streams. Natural levees formed the foundation of the man-made levees that secured agricultural lands, including wine grape vineyards presently in the current and expanded Clarksburg viticultural area.

On the lands within the Clarksburg AVA, elevations range between slightly more than 10 feet (3.0 m) above mean sea level to slightly less than 10 feet (3.0 m) below. For the most part, they are either poorly drained or somewhat poorly drained. Large portions of these delta lands are subject to persistent high water tables. Networks of open ditches and canals have been developed, which lower water tables and make wine grape growing possible at most locations within Clarksburg. Reclamation districts manage these drainage systems. An island or peninsula commonly constitutes a reclamation district, which makes them convenient units for discerning characteristics of the Clarksburg viticultural area and surrounding areas described in the petition.

Islands in the western part of the current Clarksburg American Viticultural Area largely consist of broad basins surrounded by overlapping and somewhat triangular alluvial fans on the edges. Basins mostly developed before alluvial fans. They formed from fine textured alluvial materials carried in water from the Sierra Nevada and Coast Ranges. The alluvial fans formed from coarser alluvium, with some of the parent materials originating as Placer mining debris upstream on the Sacramento River. Accordingly, the edges of lands in the western part of the current Clarksburg American Viticultural Area are usually higher in elevation than the centers. Netherlands, the Lisbon District, and Merritt Island reclamation districts are a part of this landform group.

Landforms in the eastern part of the current Clarksburg AVA differ somewhat from those in the west. Backswamps occur along with basins in the interiors of islands and peninsulas, and instead of alluvial fans, broad floodplains are common on their edges. Backswamps are marshy areas occurring in depressions between natural levees and floodplains. As in the west, the edges of lands in the eastern part of the current Clarksburg AVA tend to be higher in elevation than the centers. This landform group includes the Stone Lakes Area, Ehrheardt Club, Glanville, Randall Island, Pierson District, and Libby McNeal reclamation districts, which lie east of the Sacramento River in a physiological feature known as the Sacramento Basin. Sutter Island, which lies west of the Sacramento River, includes flood plains and backswamps, but no basins.

=== Climate ===
The seasonal summation of daily temperatures above 50 °F (10 °C), known as growing degree-days, is the traditional method for assessing and comparing grape growing climates. These are heat units that impact grapevine growth and development during the growing season, which arbitrarily begins on April 1 and ends on October 31. They drive canopy development and root growth early in the growing season, fruit and cane wood ripening after fruit set, and root growth and nutrient storage in woody vine tissues after harvest.

The Clarksburg Vintners and Growers presented 20-year average growing degree-day values (1955 through 1974) in the original Clarksburg American Viticultural Area petition. The data demonstrated that Clarksburg area had an average growing degree-day regime different than many other major wine grape growing areas in California. Specifically, the data showed Clarksburg accumulated more growing days than Livermore, St. Helena and Ukiah which lie nearer the California coast. At the same time, Clarksburg accumulated fewer growing degree-days than other interior locations, including Lodi, Davis, Modesto, Madera, and Bakersfield. In this same data set, Clarksburg and Fairfield had similar average growing degree-day values. Many nearby regions are warmer than the Clarksburg area due to the absence of abundant water and in its place, warmer land surfaces.

On the average, Clarksburg accumulates fewer growing degree-days than nearby locations to the north, west, south, and southeast. With an average of 3525 growing degree-days, Clarksburg has a cool Region IV climate according to the wine grape climate classification system or Amerine and Winkler. The other 10 locations included in this evaluation also have Region IV climates, but with the exceptions of Fairfield, Lodi, and Rio Vista they are near the median of this classification unit. Average mean temperatures for these locations follow a pattern similar to growing degree-days, with Clarksburg again being the coolest.

While Clarksburg accumulates fewer growing season heat units than other nearby locations, it has higher average growing season maximum temperatures than Rio Vista and Fairfield. These two locations are nearer Suisun Bay, San Pablo Bay, and the Carquinez Strait, and therefore, are subject to their influences to greater extent than Clarksburg. Actually, with regard average growing season maximum temperatures, Clarksburg is more similar to Antioch. Antioch is nearer the outlet of Sacramento-San Joaquin Delta than Fairfield and Rio Vista and it is partially in the lee of the East Bay section of the Coast Range. These locational factors suggest wind moderates maximum temperatures to a greater degree in Fairfield and Rio Vista than in Clarksburg, but unfortunately, wind was not part of the Western Regional Climate Center data set.

Clarksburg had markedly lower growing season minimum temperatures than Rio Vista, Fairfield and Antioch. In fact, with an average growing season minimum temperature near 51 °F (11 °C), Clarksburg was among the locations with the lowest minimum temperatures. Such low minimum temperatures are advantageous for wine grapes, slowing their nighttime metabolism and conserving acidity, especially that due to malic acid. Fruit acidity is an important contributor to perceptions of freshness, crispness, and astringency in wines.

Clarksburg's average annual rainfall is similar to many nearby locations at about 18 inches (460 mm) per year. It is less rainfall than received at Vacaville and Fairfield which lie closer to San Francisco Bay and Pacific Ocean. At the same time, it is greater rainfall than received at Stockton and Antioch which lie to the south. These trends are consistent with evidence provided in the original petition for the Clarksburg American Viticultural Area.

=== Soil ===
Lands within the Clarksburg American Viticultural Area readily fall into two groups according to landform. They are the alluvial fan - basin landform group and the flood plain - basin - backswamp landform group. The first group occurs in the west of the viticultural area and the second occurs in the east. The landforms within these groups (alluvial fans, flood plains, basins, and backswamps) influenced the development of the soils on them. As a consequence, certain soil series are common to specific landforms and to the two landform groups. Accordingly, landform groups serve as useful constructs for discussing soils of the Clarksburg American Viticultural Area.
The alluvial fan - basin group includes alluvial fan soils in the following series: Lang, Laugenour, Maria, Merritt, Sycamore, Tyndall, and Valdez series. They are most common near river and slough levees. The alluvial fan - basin group also includes a single flood plain soil that occurs only in the Netherlands area (Columbia sandy loam, partially drained, 0 to 2% slopes).
Flood plain soils within the flood plain - basin - backswamp group belong to the Columbia, Consumnes, Lang, Laugenour, Sailboat, and Valpac series. Flood plain soils, like alluvial fan soils, are common near river and slough levees. Within this same group of soils, Egbert, Gazwell, and Scribner series soils occur at lower elevations in former backswamps.

Both landform groups include basins, but the soils that cover their basins are different. Egbert, Omni, Sacramento, and Willows series soils cover basins in the area of the alluvial fan - basin group. In the area of the flood plain - basin - backswamp group, Clear Lake, Dierssen, and Tinnin series soils overlay basins. Both groups of basin soils tend to lie at lower elevations than alluvial fans or flood plains, respectively. While the two sets of basin soils share several characteristics in common, significantly, they differ in subsurface drainage. Basin soils of the alluvial fan - basin group are all poorly drained, while the basin soils of the flood plain - basin - backswamp group are somewhat poorly drained or well drained.

On the east edge of the Glanville reclamation district, which is also the easternmost edge of the Clarksburg American Viticultural Area, are the soil units residing on terraces. They are of the Galt and San Joaquin series. These soils cover a very small portion of the Clarksburg AVA. With the exceptions of the terrace soils, nearly all Clarksburg American Viticultural Area soils benefit from well placed and maintained ditches and canals. These features create low pressure zones below the soil surface that draw excessive subsurface water out of vineyard subsoils. In so doing, water tables are lowered, vineyard root zones become better aerated, and vine roots occupy more favorable environments. In some vineyards on basin and backswamp soils, ditches and canals alone are insufficient and tile drains are required for adequate subsurface drainage. Berms (i.e. ridges in the vine rows) are also common features in Clarksburg area vineyards. They drain more readily than surrounding vineyard floors and thereby, provide more favorable environments for the crowns of vines (i.e. the bottom of their trunks and the major roots that originate from them).
