= Ruth-Marion Baruch =

American photographer (1922–1997)

- Self portrait
- Born: 1922; Berlin, Germany
- Died: October 11, 1997 (aged 74–75); San Rafael, California, United States
- Education: University of Missouri, Ohio University, California School of Fine Arts
- Known for: Photography
- Spouse: Pirkle Jones

Ruth-Marion Baruch (1922 – October 11, 1997), was a German-born American photographer, remembered for her pictures of the San Francisco Bay Area in the 1960s.

== Early life and education ==
Baruch was born into a Jewish family in Berlin on June 15, 1922. She and her family migrated in 1927 to the United States. She was raised in New York City, her father Max Baruch was a neurosurgeon.

She received a BA degree in 1944 in English and journalism from the University of Missouri. She studied photography at Ohio University, and received an MFA degree in 1946; and she attended classes from 1946 to 1949 at the California School of Fine Arts (now San Francisco Art Institute) in San Francisco, in the first class of students taught by Ansel Adams, Minor White, Dorothea Lange, Homer Page, and Edward Weston after World War II.

== Photography ==
Baruch's works, in collaboration with photographer and husband Pirkle Jones, including Illusion For Sale, and a series on the Black Panther Party taken from July to October 1968, and a series on the hippies of Haight-Ashbury.

Baruch's photographs were exhibited in Perceptions at the San Francisco Museum of Art in 1954, as well as Edward Steichen's New York Museum of Modern Art exhibition, The Family of Man in 1955.

Donated by the Marin Community Foundation, The Pirkle Jones and Ruth-Marion Baruch Collection, an archive of photographs documenting the people, landscape, and politics of California in the mid-20th century, is the largest single gift in history, to U.C. Santa Cruz, with an estimated value of $32 million.

== Exhibitions ==
- “Walnut Grove: Portrait of a Town," collaboration with Pirkle Jones, exhibited at the San Francisco Museum of Art, 1964.
- “Illusion For Sale,” San Francisco Museum of Art, 1965.
- Haight Ashbury, San Francisco's M.H. de Young Museum, 1968
- A Photographic Essay on the Black Panthers, collaboration with Pirkle Jones, exhibited de Young Museum, December 1968 through February 1969. This exhibition travels to the Studio Museum of Harlem in 1969. The Vanguard: A Photographic Essay on the Black Panthers, (Boston: Beacon Press, 1970).
