= Rancho Mallacomes =

Mexican land grant in California

Coordinates: 38.630°N 122.660°W

Rancho Mallacomes (also called Moristul and Mallacomes y Plano de Agua Caliente) was a 17,742-acre (71.80 km^{2}) Mexican land grant in present-day Napa County and Sonoma County, California given in 1843 by Governor Manuel Micheltorena to José de los Santos Berreyesa.

The grant was located in the Napa Valley, just north of present-day Calistoga and consisted of Mallacomes or Moristul and Plano de Agua Caliente. Mallacomes comes from mountain chain Serro de los Mallacomes (Mount Saint Helena) and included most of Knights Valley (previously known as Mallacomes Valley). Agua Caliente refers to the warms springs near Calistoga.

== History ==
José Santos Berreyesa (1817 – 1864) was the son of José de los Reyes Berreyesa (1785 - 1846), the grantee of Rancho San Vicente. José Santos Berreyesa was a soldier at the Presidio of Sonoma from 1840 - 1842, and alcalde in 1846. He was jailed with two of his brothers by John C. Frémont in 1846 during the Bear Flag Revolt.

With the cession of California to the United States following the Mexican-American War, the 1848 Treaty of Guadalupe Hidalgo provided that the land grants would be honored. As required by the Land Act of 1851, a claim for Rancho Mallacomes was filed by José de los Santos Berreyesa with the Public Land Commission in 1852, and 12,540 acres (50.7 km^{2}) patented in 1873.

Thomas P. Knight (1820 - 1903), a participant in the Bear Flag Revolt, bought two square leagues of the northern portion of the valley from Berryessa in 1853. Knight expanded the adobe hunting lodge built by Berryessa and called his rancho, Muristood. Knight was born in Vermont, and came across the plains from Missouri in 1845, and settled in California. In 1854 he married Serena Haines in Napa Valley, and retired to San Francisco in 1870. Mallacomes Valley would be renamed "Knights Valley" after Thomas Knight. Lovett P. Rockwell (1790 - 1860) who was born in Connecticut, came to Sumner, Illinois in 1832. His health started to fail and he decided to go west in 1850, to look for gold. He bought part of the rancho from Knight but returned to Illinois in 1853. He was taken sick on the return home. In 1857, Rockwell returned to California, but came back in 1858 in no better health and died in 1860.

A claim was filed by Lovett P. Rockwell and Thomas P. Knight with the Land Commission in 1852, and 8,329 acres (33.7 km^{2}) was patented in 1873.

Calvin Holmes and his wife Elvira purchased much of Knights Valley in 1861. Real estate barons F.E. Kellogg and W.A. Stuart began building a small resort town modeled after Calistoga, called Kellogg. The town, which can still be found on present day maps, never developed into the vision held by Kellogg and it eventually was destroyed through a series of fires.

Martin E. Cook, who represented the 11th state senatorial district, and Quartmaster General Rufus Ingalls, filed a claim with the Public Land Commission in 1853 and 4 square miles (10 km^{2}) was patented in 1873.

== See also ==
- List of Ranchos of California
- Ranchos of Napa County, California
- Ranchos of Sonoma County, California
