= Geraldine Sharpe =

American photographer (1929–1968)

- Born: 1929; Trenton, New Jersey, U.S.
- Died: December 29, 1968 (aged 38–39); West Chester, Pennsylvania, U.S.
- Other name: Gerry Sharpe
- Education: San Francisco Art Institute
- Occupation: Photographer
- Years active: 1950s–1968

Geraldine Sharpe (1929–1968), also known as Gerry Sharpe, was an American photographer. She had worked as an assistant to Ansel Adams. Sharpe's two major bodies of work include photographs of landscapes, and of Ghana (from 1962).

== Biography ==
Geraldine Sharpe was born in 1929 in Trenton, New Jersey. She attended the California School of Fine Arts (now San Francisco Art Institute), where she graduated in 1956. She studied under Pirkle Jones and Bill Quandt. While in school, her film camera was a Zeiss Ikon 120.

After graduation she worked as a photo assistant for Ansel Adams between 1957 until 1962. Many of her landscape photos were taken at the same locations as Adams, however her work had more dark tonal qualities and appeared "tragic" in subject and composition.

In 1962, she was awarded the Guggenheim Fellowship for photography, which was used to work in Ghana. In 1967, she helped co-found the Friends of Photography in Carmel, California. At the time of her death in 1968 she was the director of photography at the Francis du Pont Winterhur Museum (now Winterthur Museum, Garden and Library) in Delaware.

She died on December 29, 1968, in West Chester, Pennsylvania, after a short illness at the age of 39. Her work is part of the museum collection at the Monterey Museum of Art.
