= Rancho Las Putas =

Land grant in California

Coordinates: 38.620°N 122.240°W

Rancho Las Putas was a 35,516-acre (143.73 km^{2}) Mexican land grant in present-day Napa County, California, given in 1843 by Governor Manuel Micheltorena to José de Jesús Berreyesa and Sexto "Sisto" Berreyesa. The name Las Putas came from Putah Creek, which ran through the property. Most of the grant is now covered by Lake Berryessa.

== History ==
The Berryessa Valley was about 10 miles (16 km) long and 3 miles (5 km) at its widest, with Putah Creek running through its center. Pomo people lived in relative ease on the rich land, as wildlife and plant foodstuffs were plentiful, but they were forcibly removed from their land by both Spanish and American Settlers.

=== Berreyesa family ===
Nasario Antonio Berreyesa was born into the Berreyesa family at Mission Santa Clara de Asís on July 28, 1787. Nicknamed José, Berreyesa married María de Jesus Antonia Villela (born October 6, 1793) in 1806. The couple had eleven children, including José de Jesus born January 31, 1815, and Sexto "Sisto" Antonio born on March 28, 1818. Both brothers were born in San Francisco and christened at Mission San Francisco de Asís.

Nasario Antonio "José" Berreyesa served as a corporal at the San Francisco Presidio during 1819–1824, then moved to become the original settler of the Berryessa Valley in the 1830s. Berreyesa forced 100 natives to help him manage his livestock—a herd which soon grew to 5,000 cattle and 20,000 horses, and extended eastward over Berryessa Peak into Capay Valley. The nearby hills held deer and bear. Established trails made it possible for men, horses and cattle to find their way through the hills into Capay Valley.

Sons Sisto Antonio and José de Jesus served in the Mexican army, stationed in San Francisco, from the 1830s to 1842. In 1838, the two men married twin sisters: José de Jesus married María Anastasia Higuera, and Sisto Antonio married María Nicolasa Higuera.

In 1842, Nasario Antonio Berreyesa petitioned the Mexican Governor for a grant of eight square leagues in the names of his sons Sisto Antonio and José de Jesus Berreyesa. The Governor ordered that a title issue to the petitioners for "...as much of the land as they could settle." For some unexplained reason, the Berreyesa brothers considered that the grant was for only four square leagues, and on the following day, October 28, 1843, they presented a second petition, in which they stated that their families were very large, and included their parents, children, and brothers, and asked for a grant of eight square leagues. On this second petition, a grant was issued to José de Jesus Berreyesa and Sisto Berreyesa.

The brothers built adobe estate houses about a third of the way up the valley, beginning with a 90-by-20-foot (27 m × 6 m) hacienda for Sisto, then a 60-by-20-foot (18 m × 6 m) one for José de Jesus. They expanded the livestock operation of their father to include a sizable grain harvest, and they enjoyed gambling and racing horses. Millstones for some of the first gristmills in Alta California were quarried from the upper northwest Putah Canyon, near a difficult and tortuous road out of Berryessa Valley into Napa Valley, a two-day trip by mule team.

After California was ceded to the United States in the Treaty of Guadalupe Hidalgo in 1848, the Berreyesas filed the claim with the American Public Land Commission in their wives' names in 1852, and the grant was patented to María Anastasia Higuera de Berreyesa and María Nicolasa Higuera de Berreyesa in 1863. The men used their wives' names so that the men could stand witness in front of the Public Land Commission regarding their grant and not have the commission use their interest in the claim against them.

By 1853, José de Jesus and Sisto Berreyesa had sold minor parcels of Rancho Las Putas, referred to as Berryessa Ranch by the Anglo settlers, to pay gambling debts. They owed Edward Schultz $1,645 but couldn't pay him in cash; Schultz petitioned the county to auction a major 26,000-acre (110 km^{2}) section of the Berreyesa holdings. Schultz paid only $2,000 for the huge parcel, and quickly resold it for $100,000 to a consortium of developers. José de Jesus and Sisto saved four square miles (2560 acres, or 10 km^{2}) for themselves. However, other family members contended that they owned part of the larger Rancho, based on the second grant petition which mentioned extended family. Miguel Santiago Berreyesa (b. 1831) in Berreyesa v Schultz, and Jesse Loyd Beasley (1814–1899), who married Clara Berreyesa (b. 1823) in 1848, in Schultz v Beasley, sued for ownership.

Beginning in 1858, a toll road was operated by Adam See and his family, called the Putah Creek Canyon Turnpike. It shuttled people and goods eastward from Berryessa Valley to Winters, California, and back.

Sisto Berreyesa and his brother José de Jesús both died in 1874. They were buried in Berryessa Valley.

=== Monticello ===
In 1866, the developer holding the majority of land in the valley divided Rancho Las Putas into smaller parcels to sell to farmers, and platted a town called Monticello. Within a year, the valley was filled with farmers who enjoyed mild winters and bountiful harvests, especially of wheat. By 1870, Monticello contained a cemetery, a general store, blacksmith shops, hotels and various other businesses. In 1875, the toll road was opened to become a public road, maintained by the county. A four- and six-horse stagecoach ran from the 300 men working at the remote quicksilver mining town of Knoxville south through to Monticello, where the horses were changed, then west to Napa. The first adobe belonging to Sisto Berreyesa was left to ruin, but the second was held by a settler named Abraham Clark.

In 1900 and 1901, news of a high-quality oil strike in Berryessa Valley brought speculators and experts in drilling.

=== Damming Putah Creek ===
In 1896, a heavy stone bridge with three large arches was built across Putah Ceek about 1.5 miles (2 km) from Monticello, along the road leading to Napa. The bridge cost $19,500 and, at 298 feet (91 m) long, was the largest stone bridge west of the Rocky Mountains. The well-engineered bridge survived the swollen flood of Putah Creek every winter thenceforward.

As early as 1906, proposals were put forward to dam Putah Creek to form a reservoir. In 1907, the Mulholland-Goethals-Davis plan proposed a dam at Devil's Gate, the southeastern limit of the valley. Other plans were formulated. No proposal was acted upon until 1947 when Solano County and the United States Bureau of Reclamation together formed the Solano Project, a combination of water plans including Monticello Dam, the Putah Diversion Dam, the Putah South Canal, the Terminal Dam and Reservoir, the Green Valley Conduit and various related water distribution systems. Residents of Monticello protested, but California Governor Earl Warren and Solano County promoted the dam. Residents started leaving the valley.

Dorothea Lange and Pirkle Jones were commissioned to shoot a photographic documentary of the death of the town, and of the displacement of its residents, for Life, but the magazine did not run the piece. Lange's Aperture magazine, however, devoted one whole issue to the photojournalists' work.

Construction of the dam began in 1953. Vegetation in the valley was chopped down, fences torn down and buildings demolished. The cemetery was moved to Spanish Flat, a bluff overlooking the valley. The Putah Creek Bridge, too well made to easily demolish, was left in place to be covered by the rising waters. Monticello Dam was completed in 1957, and Lake Berryessa was formed.

== See also ==
- Ranchos of California
- List of Ranchos of California
