= Cloverdale Municipal Airport =

Airport in California, United States

- IATA: none; ICAO: none; FAA LID: O60

Summary
- Airport type: City of Cloverdale
- Operator: Cloverdale, California
- Location: 272
- Elevation AMSL: 82.9 ft (25.3 m)
- Coordinates: 38°46′34″N 122°59′33″W
- Interactive map of Cloverdale Municipal Airport

Runways
Direction	Length		Surface
Direction	ft	m	Surface
14/32	2,909	887	Asphalt

Cloverdale Municipal Airport (FAA LID: O60) is a public airport located three miles (4.8 km) southeast of Cloverdale, serving Sonoma County, California, United States. It is mostly used for general aviation. Other activities at the airport include skydiving, ultralight and experimental activities. It is home to Quality Sport Planes, the western representative for Zenith Aircraft Company since 2005.

== Facilities ==
Cloverdale Municipal Airport covers 58 acres (230,000 m^{2}) and has one runway:

- Runway 14/32: 2,909 x 60 ft (887 x 18 m), surface: asphalt
