= Capay, Glenn County, California =

Unincorporated community in California, United States

Capay
- Unincorporated community
- Location in California Capay (the United States)
- Coordinates: 39°47′48″N 122°05′04″W
- Country: United States
- State: California
- County: Glenn
- Elevation: 187 ft (57 m)

Capay (Wintun: Kapai, meaning "Stream") is an unincorporated community in Glenn County, California, United States. It is located 7 miles (11 km) east-northeast of Orland, at an elevation of 187 feet (57 m).

The Capay Rancho, encompassing the present site of Capay, was granted to Josefa Soto in 1844 by the Mexican government; it was one of only three such California land grants recognized by the US government, and was formally transferred to Soto by President James Buchanan in 1859.
