= Berryessa family of California =

Berreyesa family of California
- Current region: California
- Estates: Rancho Las Putas; Rancho Milpitas; Rancho Cañada de Capay; Rancho Cañada de los Capitancillos; Rancho Mallacomes

The Berreyesa family is a prominent Californio family of Northern California. Members of the family held extensive rancho grants across the Bay Area during 18th and 19th centuries. Numerous places are named after the family, including the Berryessa district of San Jose and Lake Berryessa in Napa County.

== Family ==
The Berreyesa were a substantial clan of Basque-heritage Spanish-speaking settlers in early Northern California who held extensive land in the greater San Francisco Bay Area. The members of the family lost nearly all of their real estate holdings to English settlers, debts and legal battles in the decades following the formation of the United States Public Land Commission in 1851—though pre-existing land grants of Mexican-era landowners had been continued by the Treaty of Guadalupe Hidalgo. In the 1850s, Anglo settlers of California killed eight Berreyesa men, and some Berreyesas chose to leave Northern California to save their lives. Antonio Berreyesa once said that his Californio family was the "one which most justly complained of the bad faith of the adventurers and squatters and of the treachery of American lawyers."

A report to the Superintendent of Indian Affairs for California in 1854 described finding 150 Native Americans in conditions of slavery in Berryessa Valley. The Berryessa family was said to have numerous slave labor gangs which they had violently acquired from the nearby Stony Creek Mountain and Valley. They were also found to engage in the illegal selling of young male and female Native American slaves.

The name Berreyesa comes from the Basque name Berreiarza or Berreyarza, and was changed in California to several alternate spellings including Berelleza, Berrellez, Berrellesa and Berryessa. Lake Berryessa is the largest geographical feature named for the family.

== New Spain ==
In the early 18th century, a married couple from the Berrelleza and Cayetano families left the Basque region of Spain to travel to New Spain, and in 1717 they bore a son in Sinaloa. This son, José de Jesús (Cayetano) Berrelleza, married 10-year-old María Nicolasa Micaela Leyba (or Leyva) in Sinaloa in 1735. In 1754, María and José Berrelleza welcomed a daughter, Ana Ysabel (also spelled Isabel), and in 1761 they produced a son, Nicolás Antonio. The children's mother died, and their father took a new wife that the children were very unhappy with.

In 1775, the Spanish government indicated its desire to settle Alta California against further encroachment by Russian fur trappers, so in October, the Lieutenant Colonel Juan Bautista de Anza formed a party of 200 colonists including soldiers for protection. Ana Ysabel, 21, and Nicolás Antonio Berrelleza, 14, joined the group, traveling with the Gabriel Peralta family. The party arrived at Mission San Gabriel Arcángel in January 1776, then continued on to land at Monterey, California in March.

== Notable members ==
=== Nicolás Antonio Berrelleza ===
In 1777, Ana Isabel Berrelleza married Juan José Peralta, another member of the Anza colonist party, but they did not have children. At the age of 18, Nicolás Antonio Berrelleza married Peralta's sister, María Gertrudis Peralta, October 10, 1779, at Mission Santa Clara de Asís. His new wife was five years younger and also a native of New Spain, born at the Presidio de Tubac (in modern-day Arizona) in 1766.

María and Nicolás Berrelleza produced nine children from 1780 to 1797, born in San Francisco and the Santa Clara area. Three of their four sons went on to hold large Mexican land grants: José de los Reyes held land in San José including the rich New Almaden quicksilver mine, Nazario Antonio raised great herds of livestock on Rancho Las Putas for himself and his sons, and Nicolás Antonio II was granted Rancho Milpitas. The eldest daughter, María Gabriela, married into the Castro family; she and her husband settled Rancho San Pablo in what is now called Contra Costa County.

María Gertrudis Peralta Berrelleza died at age 36 in December 1802 and was buried at Mission San José (Her brother Luís María Peralta later became a powerful landowner, with holdings in San José as well as the extensive Rancho San Antonio.). Nicolás Berrelleza remarried November 19, 1803, at Mission Santa Clara, to 13-year-old María Ignacio Amador, and produced a son, Francisco, in May 1804. Berrelleza died in October 1804 at the age of 43, and was buried at Mission Santa Clara. His widow bore him a daughter seven months later.

=== María Gabriela Berreyesa Castro ===
María Gabriela Berrelleza (also spelled Berreyesa) was born November 26, 1780, and christened the same day at Mission Santa Clara. She was the first child of the family. On February 16, 1795, she married 22-year-old Francisco María Castro, third son of Joaquín de Castro, one of the founding settlers of San José and a corporal in the artillery company of San Francisco. The two made their home in San José and produced thirteen offspring during 1796–1824. Castro was made an elector in 1822 after which he served as alcalde and on a civil board that heard disputes.

Castro explored land at the northeast edge of San Francisco Bay in 1823, and was granted Rancho San Pablo by Governor Luís Antonio Argüello. He and his family moved to the rancho some time after 1824. He died in 1831 at San Pablo.

María Gabriela Berreyesa Castro died on December 21, 1851, and was buried at Mission San Francisco de Asís, known as Mission Dolores. Rancho San Pablo was patented to her children in 1852.

=== José de los Reyes Berreyesa ===
José de los Reyes Berrelleza (also spelled Berreyesa) was born at Mission Santa Clara on January 6, 1785, the third child and first son in the family. He served as an army sergeant at El Presidio Real de San Francisco. In 1805, he married María Zacarías Bernal at Mission Santa Clara. The couple had 13 children during 1807–1833, with 10 living past infancy. They moved in 1834 to hold land in Almaden Valley.

In 1842, José de los Reyes Berreyesa received from Governor Juan Bautista Alvarado a grant giving him one square league, or 4,438 acres (18 km^{2}), of the land he had been cultivating, called Rancho San Vicente, near the Santa Teresa Hills and at the south end of Almaden Valley. The grant included a large section of the rocky hills upon which a rich source of mercury-carrying cinnabar ore was found in 1844–1845, and the discovery was made public. Mercury was an important part of gold- and silver-mining operations, and was in demand the world over, and especially in the California gold fields after 1848. The neighboring grant, Rancho Cañada de los Capitancillos, was now held by Andrés Castillero, who claimed the mercury mine was part of his land. Robert Walkinshaw and some other men squatted on the land in February 1845 and began to take lumber and limestone away for sale in August. The New Almaden mercury mine began producing a small amount of rich ore in 1846.

In 1846, during the Bear Flag Revolt, three of the sons of José de los Reyes Berreyesa were imprisoned by John C. Frémont in Sonoma, California, where one of the sons, José de los Santos Berreyesa, had been serving as Alcalde. Accompanied by two cousins, twin sons of Francisco de Haro, the 61-year-old father went to see how his sons were being treated in prison. After they landed their boat in San Rafael, the three men were shot and killed by three of Frémont's men, including Kit Carson, and they were stripped of their belongings. When asked by prisoner José de los Santos Berreyesa whether their father had been killed, Frémont said it might have been a man named Castro. A soldier of Frémont's was seen wearing the elder Berreyesa's serape, and Frémont refused to assist José de los Santos Berreyesa in retrieving it as a final token of their father to give to their mother. The three brothers resorted to buying the serape from the soldier for the extortionate price of $25 ($896 today.) Later, Carson told Jasper O'Farrell that he regretted killing the Californios, but that the act was only one such that Frémont ordered him to commit.

The New Almaden mine was taken in possession by Robert Walkinshaw of the New Almaden Mining Company in April 1847 by means of a forged grant document supposedly bearing the signature of the alcalde of Presidio San José, José Dolores Pacheco, who always signed documents "Dolores Pacheco"—the questionable document was signed only "Pacheco", and in a finer hand than his. Three of the Berreyesa sons battled with the squatters, trying to dislodge them from the mining works. Their mother, the widow María Zacarías Bernal de Berreyesa, fought for the land by filing suit in court against the New Almaden Mining Company. Castillero filed suit to prove his claim on the mine, and the United States worked to prove the mining land was public, not part of any grant, so that the government could seize the mine. The case dragged on for years as witnesses were called from Mexico. In July 1854, her ninth son, José de la Encarnación Ramón Antonio Berreyesa, was grabbed by a posse, tied with rope around the neck and questioned, but was set free. Several days later, her fifth son, Joseph Zenobia Nemesio Berreyesa, was guarding the New Almaden mine at night when he was seized by masked men and hanged. In 1856, men broke into the home of her seventh son, Francisco Antonio Berreyesa, and killed him. After leaving for the relative safety of Ventura, José de la Encarnación Ramón Antonio Berreyesa was caught on February 5, 1857, by a band of vigilantes that had been told he consorted with the bandit Juan Flores. The vigilantes, a group called the El Monte Rangers who were frustrated at the recent escape of Flores, saw the rope scars around Berreyesa's neck and assumed he had somehow foiled a prior attempt at execution, so they hanged him until dead.

An 1863 court decision in the Berreyesas' favor allowed them to sell the rights to work the mine for $1,700,000 in 1864. Eventually, the United States was able to prove that the two adjoining land grants did not include the rocky hills and the mine, and the mining operation was nationalized. The Berreyesa family was finally rewarded on June 24, 1868, with a patent issued by the United States Supreme Court stating that the arable land of the rancho was theirs, but not the rocky hills containing the mines. Doña María died in 1869 in San Rafael.

1876 was the year that the greatest amount of mercury was removed from the New Almaden mine: 3,610,341 pounds (1,637,623 kg) of the liquid metal. By 1880, $16 million worth of mercury had been mined, about $534 million in current value.

=== Descendants ===
- José de los Santos Berreyesa (1817–1864), son of José de los Reyes Berreyesa (1785-1846). Served as alcalde of Sonoma, California, jailed by John C. Frémont in 1846 during the Bear Flag Revolt. Held Rancho Mallacomes.
- José Ygnacio Marianio Berreyesa (1807–1841). Born the first son of José de los Reyes Berreyesa (1785–1846).
- José Catarino Berreyesa (1815–?). Third son of José de los Reyes Berreyesa (1785–1846). Held grant Rancho Canada de Capay in 1846.
- José de Jesus Berreyesa (1815–1874). Son of Nasario Antonio Berreyesa (1787–?). Held Rancho Las Putas with his brother.
- José Martin Berreyesa (1821–1864). Son of Nasario Antonio Berreyesa (1787–?); served as soldier at the Presidio of Sonoma.
- José Antonio Melquiades Berreyesa (1826–?). Son of Nicolas Tolantino Antonio Berreyesa (1789–1863); struggled with his father to keep Rancho Milpitas.
- José Guadalupe Fernando Berreyesa (1826–1873). Eighth son of José de los Reyes Berreyesa (1785–1846). Shot in a duel.
- José de la Encarnacion Ramon Antonio Berreyesa (1828–1857). Ninth son of José de los Reyes Berreyesa (1785–1846). Hanged by vigilantes in Los Angeles, California.
- José Domingo Bonifacio Berreyesa (1830–1844). Tenth son of José de los Reyes Berreyesa (1785–1846).
- José Santos Berreyesa I (1848–?), son of José de los Santos Berreyesa (1817–1864).
- José Santos Berreyesa II (1851–?), son of José de los Santos Berreyesa (1817–1864).
- José Santos Berreyesa III (1854–1922), son of José de los Santos Berreyesa (1817–1864).
- José Jesus Berreyesa (1844–?), son of José de Jesus Berreyesa (1815–1874); tried to hold Rancho Las Putas.

=== Nazario Antonio Berrelleza ===
Nazario Antonio Berrelleza (also spelled Nasario Berreyesa, nicknamed José) was born at Mission Santa Clara on July 28, 1787, the fourth child and second son in the family. He served as an army corporal at Presidio San Francisco, 1819–1824. As payment for his government service, he accepted a 35,516-acre (143.73 km^{2}) grant of land contained in a river valley east of Napa, California, called Rancho Las Putas, named for Putah Creek which ran through it. Nazario raised 5,000 cattle, 20,000 horses and grew grain crops throughout the fertile valley that became known as Berryessa Valley. The livestock holdings extended northward over some rocky hills to a neighboring valley, Rancho Cañada de Capay, ranched by Berreyesa cousins.

=== Nicolás Antonio Berreyesa II ===
Nicolás Tolentino Antonio Berrelleza (also known as Nicolás Antonio Berreyesa II) was born at Mission Santa Clara on July 12, 1789, the fifth child and third son in the family. He served as a leather-armored soldier (soldado de cuera) at Presidio San Francisco, and married María de Gracia Padilla in 1811 at Mission Dolores. In 1834, he was granted Rancho Milpitas, an area equal to one square league, or 4,458 acres (18 km^{2}), by the alcalde of San José, Pedro Chaboya. The governor of Alta California, José Castro, granted a neighboring tract to José María Alviso sixteen months later, in 1835. In 1852, Anglo squatters were living on the Alviso and Berreyesa grants in numbers too great for the Californios to eject. A man named James Jake described to Nicolás Antonio Berreyesa a scheme wherein Berreyesa and three of his sons would emulate the squatters and mark out four new plots to build dwellings and establish their claim on the land. Jake quickly moved into the empty Berreyesa adobe and claimed the whole grant. Berreyesa lost $500 in paying for a failed court battle to regain his rancho. Another Anglo settler laid out Alviso's claim using measurements that included a sizable piece of the Berreyesa claim, including crops and buildings. Berreyesa sued, but his lawyers dropped out of sight while supposedly covering his case in Washington, D.C., losing irreplaceable documents. Berreyesa burned the rest of his real estate documents in a mad rage. The Alviso claim won out in 1871. Nicolás Antonio Berreyesa died in 1873.

== See also ==
- List of Californios people
