= Rancho Cañada de los Capitancillos =

Mexican land grant in California

Coordinates: 37.230°N 121.900°W

Rancho Cañada de los Capitancillos was a 1,110-acre (4.5 km^{2}) Mexican land grant in present day Santa Clara County, California given in 1842 by Governor Juan B. Alvarado to Justo Larios. The name means the Valley of the Little Captains. The grant was south of present day San Jose and bounded on the west by the Guadalupe River.

== History ==
Justo Larios (1808–), son of Jose Larios, was a military artilleryman at the Presidio of San Francisco. Larios was granted the one square league Rancho Los Capitancillos in 1842. Larios sold the whole grant to Grove C. Cook (–1852) in 1845. In 1848 Cook sold the northern part of the grant (Rancho Cañada de los Capitancillos) to the Guadalupe Mining Company. Cook died in 1852, and Charles Fossat bought the other three-quarters of the grant in a sheriff's sale.

With the cession of California to the United States following the Mexican-American War, the 1848 Treaty of Guadalupe Hidalgo provided that the land grants would be honored. As required by the Land Act of 1851, a claim for Rancho Cañada de los Capitancillos was filed with the Public Land Commission in 1852, and a portion of the grant was patented to Charles Fossatt Feb. 3, 1865, for 3,360.48 acres. A second claim was filed by Guadalupe Mining Company in 1853 and a portion of the grant was patented to Guadalupe Mining Company in 1871.
