= Grand Island, California =

Unincorporated community in California, United States

Grand Island
- Unincorporated community
- Location in California Grand Island (the United States)
- Coordinates: 39°03′58″N 121°52′06″W
- Country: United States
- State: California
- County: Colusa
- Elevation: 33 ft (10 m)

Grand Island is an unincorporated area in Colusa County, California, United States, on the Sacramento River. It lies at an elevation of 33 feet (10 m). The name refers to the area between Sycamore Slough and the Sacramento River, including the town of Grimes and the steamboat stop at Eddy's Landing. The region is heavily cultivated and in 1891 was described as full of "a thrifty class of people".
