= Capay Hills =

- Location within California Location within the United States

Highest point
- Elevation: 420 m (1,380 ft)

Geography
- Country: United States
- State: California
- Region: Inner Northern California Coast Ranges
- District: Yolo County
- Range coordinates: 38°45′54.649″N 122°7′8.903″W
- Topo map: USGS Bird Valley

The Capay Hills are a low mountain range of the Inner Northern California Coast Ranges System, in Yolo County, California.

They are located on the western side of the Sacramento Valley.

The Capay Valley and Capay Valley AVA are west of the hills.
