= Capay Valley =

Rural valley in Yolo County, California, US

Coordinates: 38.710737°N 122.047193°W

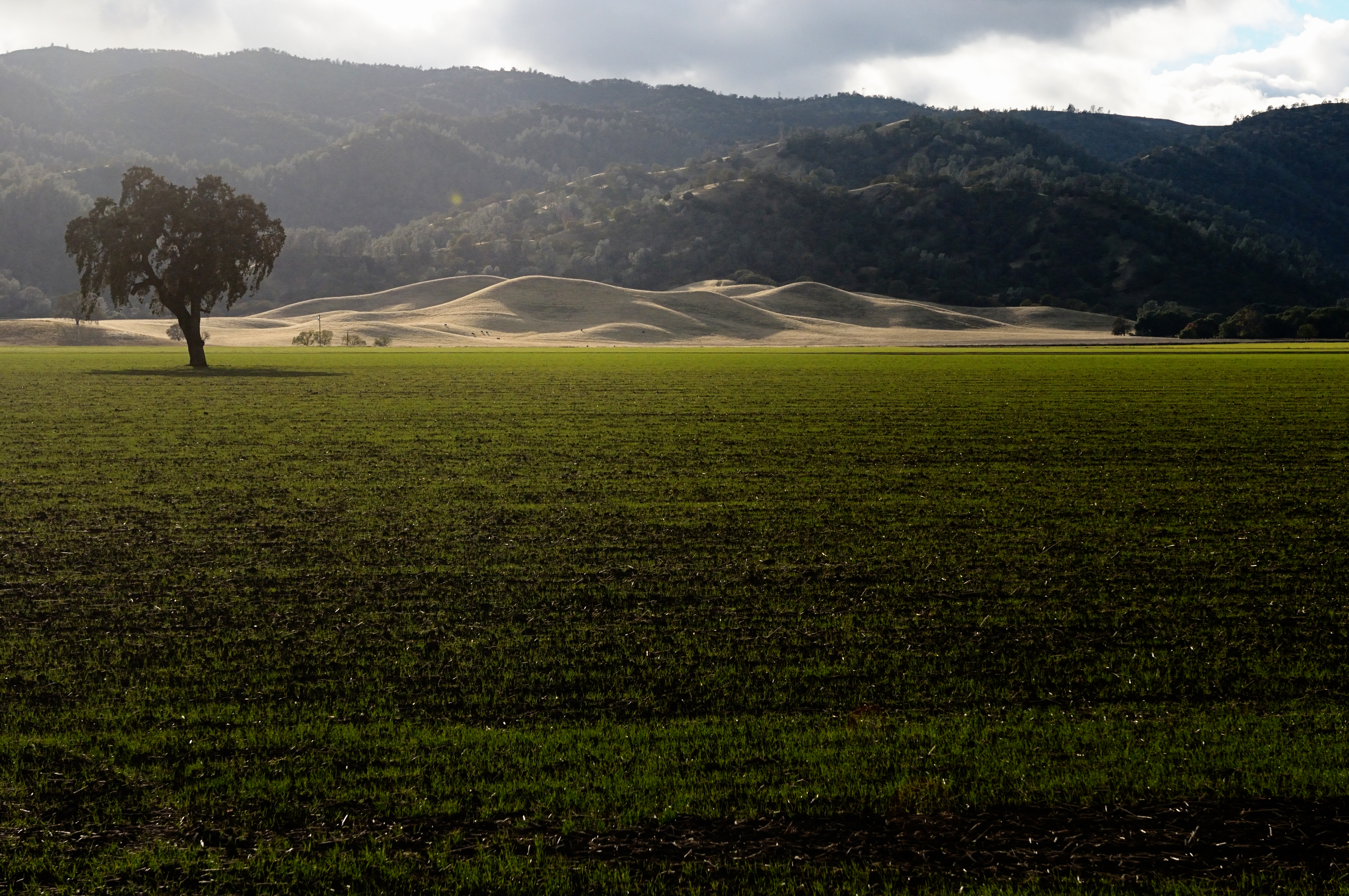
Capay Valley and Blue Ridge.

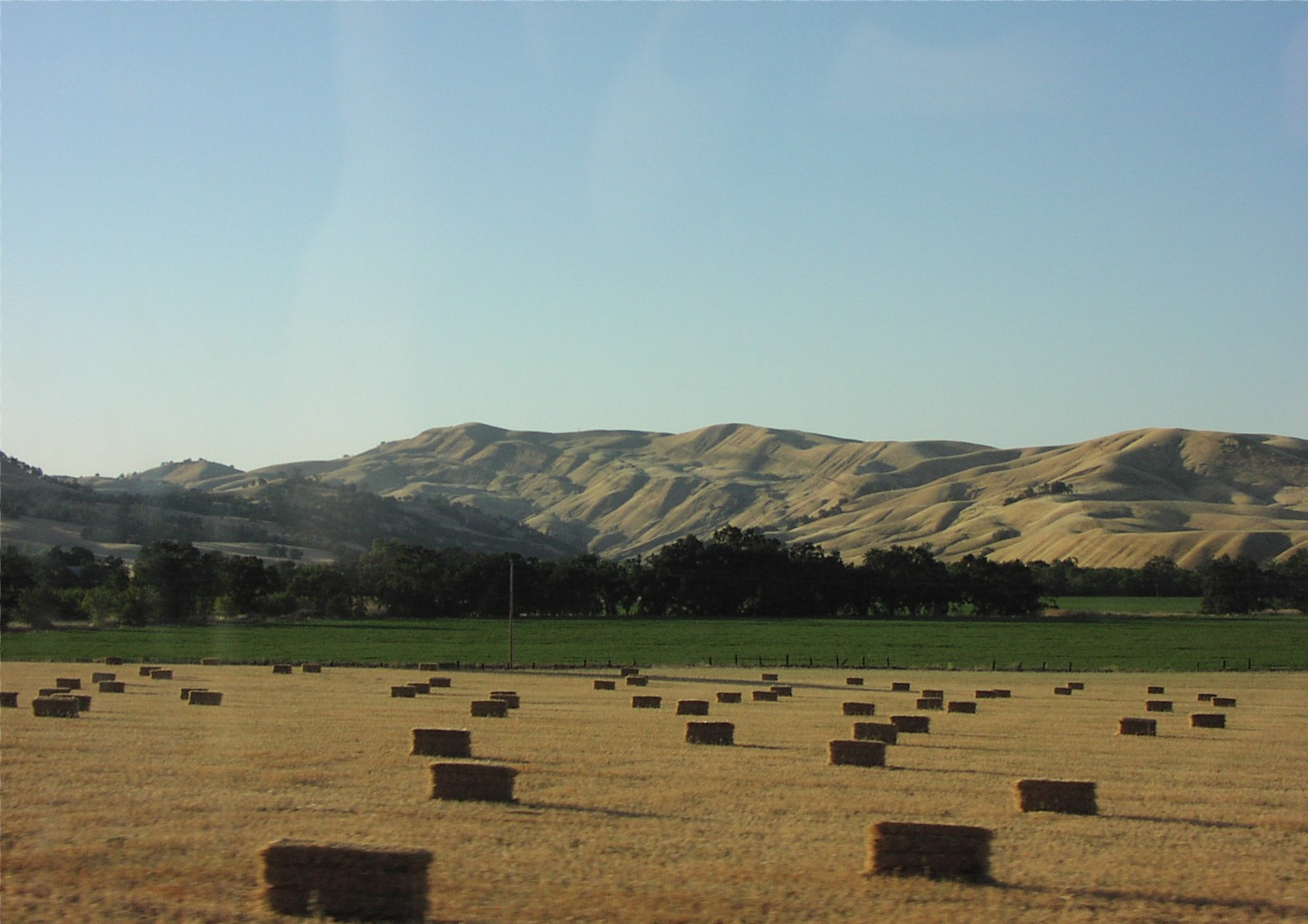
Capay Valley hay harvest and Capay Hills.

Capay Valley is a mostly rural valley northwest of Sacramento in Yolo County, California, United States. It lies east of Blue Ridge and west of the Capay Hills.

== Geography ==
Cache Creek flows through the valley.

California State Route 16 crosses through the Capay Valley.

The Capay Valley AVA, an American Viticultural Area (AVA) wine region, includes portions of the valley.

== History ==
Capay Valley is the traditional home of the Patwin or southern Wintun people, now the known as the Yocha Dehe Wintun Nation. The Cache Creek Casino Resort is in the valley.

The historic Mexican land grant of Rancho Canada de Capay formerly owned the valley in the 19th century.

== See also ==
- Ranchos of Yolo County, California
- List of Ranchos of California
- Ranchos of California
- American Viticultural Area - AVA
