= Rancho San Vicente =

Pre-statehood California land grant

Coordinates: 37.190°N 121.810°W

Rancho San Vicente was a 4,438-acre (17.96 km^{2}) Mexican land grant in present-day Santa Clara County, California given in 1842 by Governor Juan Alvarado to José de los Reyes Berreyesa. The grant was located west of the Santa Teresa Hills at the south end of Almaden Valley. The grant was bounded on the north by Rancho Los Capitancillos.

== History ==
José Reyes Berreyesa (1785–1846) was the son of Nicholas Antonio Berreyesa (1761–1804). José Reyes Berreyesa married Maria Zacarais Bernal (1791–) in 1805. One of their sons was the grantee of Rancho Mallacomes, and three other sons were the grantees of Rancho Canada de Capay. Berreyesa was a teacher at San Francisco in 1823. He retired as sergeant with thirty-seven years' of service to his credit, and was granted the one square league Rancho San Vicente by Governor Alvarado in 1842. José Reyes Berreyesa was killed by John C. Frémont's men on June 28, 1846, as he landed from a boat at San Rafael on his way to Sonoma to visit his son Jose de los Santos Berreyesa, the Alcalde of Sonoma, who was being held prisoner.

With the cession of California to the United States following the Mexican-American War, the 1848 Treaty of Guadalupe Hidalgo provided that the land grants would be honored. As required by the Land Act of 1851, a claim was filed with the Public Land Commission in 1852, and the grant was patented to Berreyesa's widow Maria Zacarias Berreyesa in 1868.

The New Almaden Quicksilver Mines were discovered in 1845, and mining operations began in 1847, just in time for the California Gold Rush. José Reyes Berreyessa laid claim to the mine on the basis that it lay on Rancho San Vicente. However, Justo Larios of Rancho Los Capitancillos also claimed ownership, and the United States government even stepped in to claim that the mine lay on public land. A complex legal case described by The New York Times as "one of the most remarkable civil trials in this or any other country", United States v. Andres Castillero eventually reached the United States Supreme Court whereupon it was finally decided in 1862 that, the mine was on Rancho Los Capitancillos, and that the furnaces and improvements of the company below the hill were on Rancho San Vicente. The company bought into these two titles and then sold the entire operation in 1864 to the Quicksilver Mining Company.

== See also ==
- Ranchos of Santa Clara County, California
