= Jasper O'Farrell =

Irish-American politician

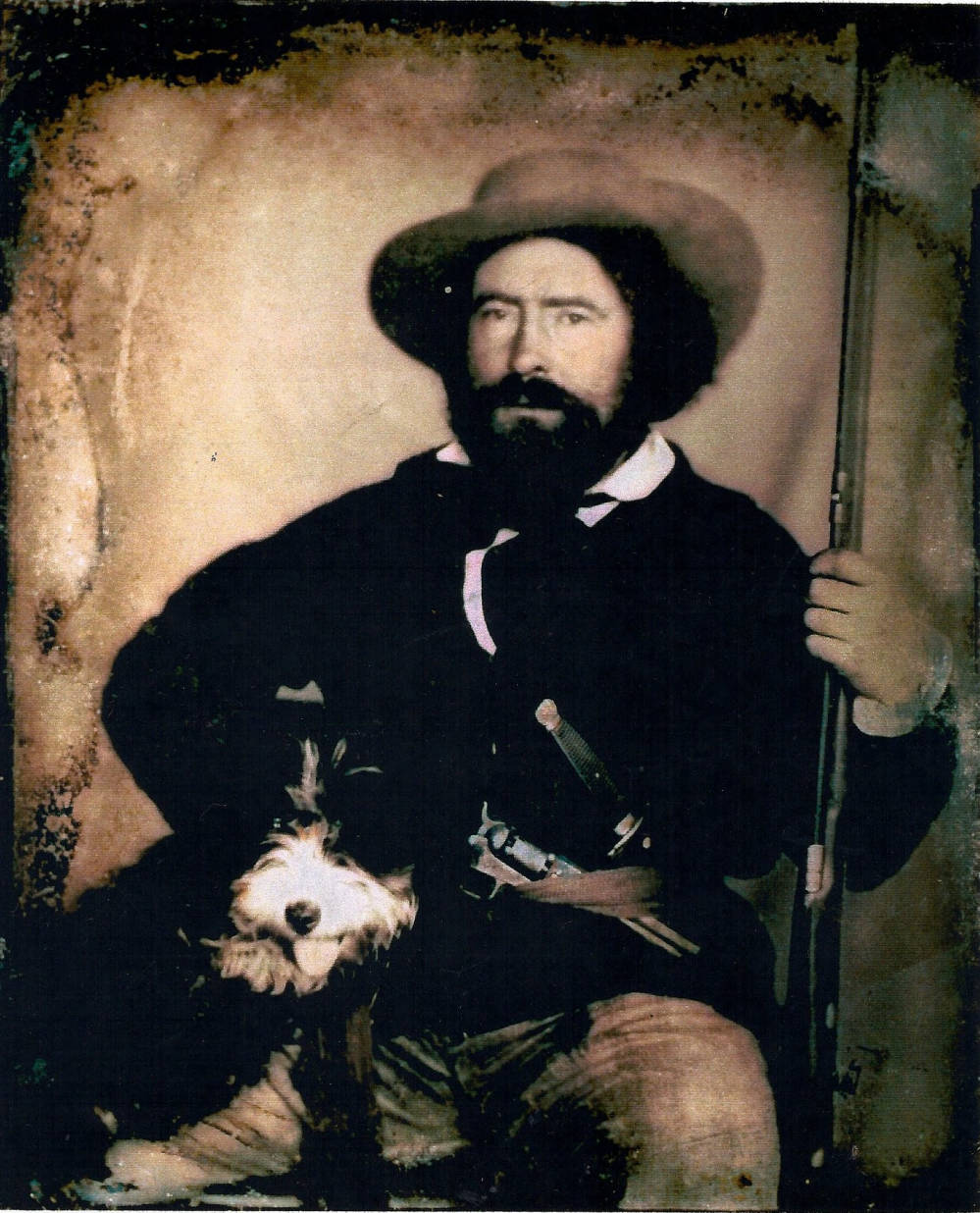
- O'Farrell c. 1850
- Born: 1817; County Wexford, Ireland
- Died: November 16, 1875 (aged 57–58); San Francisco, California, U.S.

Jasper O'Farrell (1817–1875) was an Irish-American politician who served as the first surveyor for San Francisco. He designed the "grand promenade" that became today's Market Street. O'Farrell Street in San Francisco is named after him.

== Early life ==
O'Farrell was born in County Wexford, Ireland, in 1817 and was educated in Dublin. He went to London, England, where he boarded a ship bound for South America. After leaving Chile, he came to San Francisco in 1843.

== Land grant surveys ==
O'Farrell found work with the Mexican government and surveyed much of Marin and Sonoma counties. He was one of the first settlers of Sebastopol, where he purchased Rancho Estero Americano in 1843. He named the valley after Annaly, Ireland, the home of the O'Farrell family.

== Survey of San Francisco ==
Following the American conquest of San Francisco, the Military Mayor of San Francisco, Lt. Washington Allon Bartlett commissioned a land survey of Yerba Buena (later to be called San Francisco) in 1847. O'Farrell improved the 1839 street maps produced by the former Mexican alcalde (mayor) of Yerba Buena, Francisco Guerrero, and his Swiss surveyor, Jean Jacques Vioget. O'Farrell's map covered the area bounded by Post, Mason, and Green Streets and the Bay, and also corrected the Vioget street designs, which were 2 1/2 degrees off true right angles.

Shortly after that survey he established the location (parallel to Mission Street) and width of Market Street. He was also influential in naming streets, including Market, Lombard, Chestnut, Filbert, and Pine. O'Farrell named Valparaiso Street after the port in Chile, where he lived for a time before coming to San Francisco.

== Later life ==
O'Farrell was an eye-witness to the murders of José de los Reyes Berreyesa and the twin sons, Francisco and Ramon, of Francisco De Haro, in 1846. His account of the murders, by soldiers under the command of John C. Frémont, is believed to have hindered Frémont's political career.

O'Farrell acquired significant land holdings. He was the grantee of Rancho Estero Americano and claimant for Rancho Cañada de Jonive and Rancho Cañada de Capay. At one time, he owned a part of Rancho Nicasio. Jasper O'Farrell married Mary McChristian in 1849. He was elected as State Senator from Sonoma County in 1858. He died November 16, 1875, in San Francisco.
