= Merritt Island (California) =

Island and viticultural area in Yolo County, California

Coordinates: 38°23′18″N 121°32′29″W

- Wine region
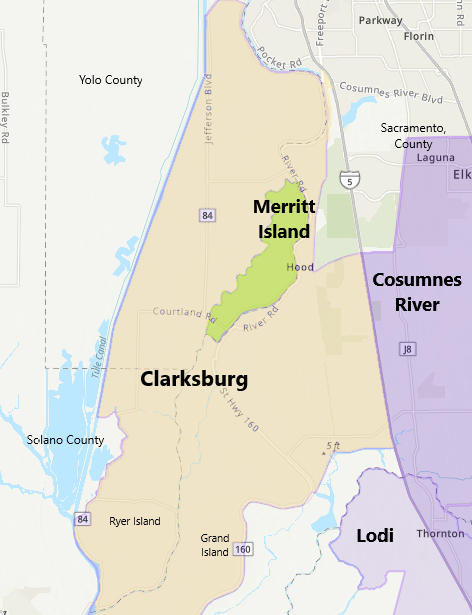
- Type: American Viticultural Area
- Year established: 1983
- Years of wine industry: 57
- Country: United States
- Part of: California, Yolo County, Clarksburg AVA
- Growing season: 281 days
- Climate region: Region IV
- Heat units: 3,525 GDD units
- Precipitation (annual average): 18 in (460 mm)
- Soil conditions: Columbian sandy loam
- Total area: 5,000 acres (8 sq mi)
- Size of planted vineyards: 425 acres (172 ha)
- No. of vineyards: 5
- Grapes produced: Cabernet Sauvignon, Chenin Blanc, Merlot, Petite Sirah, Riesling, Sauvignon Blanc and Semillion
- No. of wineries: 2

Merritt Island is an American Viticultural Area (AVA) located in Yolo County, California on the namesake island landform in the Sacramento River Delta lying only six miles (9.7 km) south of the state capital of Sacramento. The 5,000-acre (8 sq mi) wine appellation was established as the nation's 33^{rd}, the state's 21^{st} and the county's initial AVA on May 17, 1983 by the Bureau of Alcohol, Tobacco and Firearms (ATF), Treasury after reviewing the petition submitted by Mr. Chris Bogle of Bogle Vineyards, Incorporated, on behalf of himself, proposing the viticultural area within Yolo County to be known as "Merritt Island."

The island, approximately six miles (9.7 km) long from north to south and only 1.6 miles (2.6 km) at its widest point, is surrounded by Elk Slough, Sutter Slough, and the Sacramento River with a maritime climate of cool breezes and fog arriving from the nearby San Francisco Bay. Its soil is a very fertile and rich loam yielding grapes used in blends with fruit from other parts of the state. Merritt Island was administered under Reclamation District 150.
In January 1984, Merritt Island viticultural area became a sub-appellation within the 16-mile-long (26 km) by 8-mile-wide (13 km), 64,640 acres (101 sq mi) Clarksburg AVA that spanned across portions of Sacramento, Solano and Yolo Counties.

== History ==
The first recorded evidence of establishment of the boundaries of Merritt Island comes from the first reclamation efforts in 1850. Credit must go to Josiah Greene, who in 1850 came to California from Leesburg, Virginia, and settled on what today is called Merritt Island. He arrived in time to witness the terrible floods of that winter, which were a continuation of the floods of 1849. Undaunted by his experiences and realizing that the lands on which he was farming would prove an exceptionally profitable venture even in those times of excessive prices, Mr. Greene planned his future there. In 1852 he built by hand the first levee on Merritt Island; the first work of its kind in California. Forty years later two sons, George B. and Lester Greene, purchased a clamshell dredger and put a levee around Swampland District No. 150 - the legislative name of Merritt Island in another bit of pioneering. This dredger called the George A. Moore, was either the oldest, or the second oldest, of its kind in the state.

== Terroir ==
=== Topography ===
Merritt Island, six miles south of the Sacramento city limits, is the first island forming the alluvial fan of the Sacramento Delta. It is bounded on the west by Elk Slough, the first channel exiting from the Sacramento River, Sutter Slough on the south, and the Sacramento River on the east. Since some of Merritt Island is below sea level, most of the grapes are grown adjacent to the levees surrounding Merritt Island providing a well-drained environment.

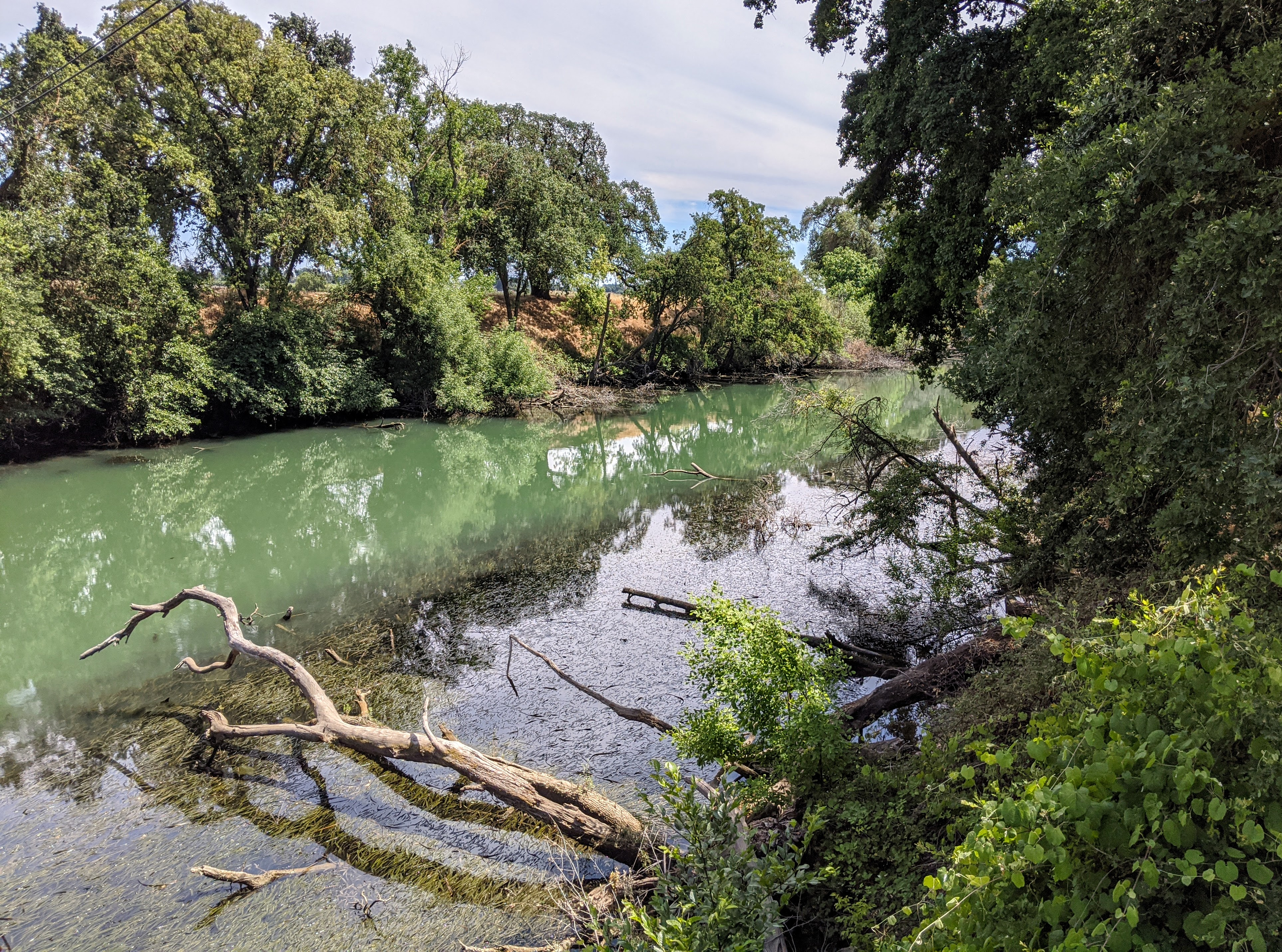
Merritt Island viewed from the Courtland Road bridge across Elk Slough

=== Climate ===
Climatically the area of Merritt Island is very unique. During the growing season the Island is cooled by the south westerly breezes originating from the Carquinez Straits near San Francisco. These breezes result in a median temperature difference from Sacramento of 10 °F (−12 °C) during both day and night. Fog seldom reaches Merritt Island during the growing season as it is the northern-most island in the Sacramento Delta. Other islands further south are closer to the San Francisco Bay Area and hence have more fog in the summer and fall. The USDA plant hardiness zone is 9b.

=== Soil ===
The soil type of Merritt Island is a Columbian Sandy Loam deposited from runoff centuries ago from the California Coast Range. Some soil types surrounding Merritt Island consist of Sierra Loam, on the east side of the Sacramento River, and Peat Dirt, an organically structure soil, exists on the other islands south of Merritt. To the west in the Yolo Bypass, an adobe or clay type soil is found.

== Viticulture ==
The petitioner claims that commercial grape-growing, within Merritt Island, first began in 1969. At the outset, there were five vineyard operators within the area. There were 425 acres (172 ha) of wine grapes planted, with additional acres of new plantings. The petitioner had 156 acres (63 ha) of cultivation. Bogle Vineyards qualified with ATF as a bonded winery in March 1979 and since has bottled "estate bottled wines" and "varietal wines." There are eight varieties of wine grapes being cultivated and the principal variety is Chenin Blanc. The other varieties are Grey Riesling, Petite Sirah, Semillion, Cabernet Sauvignon, Sauvignon Blanc and Merlot.
