= Randall Island =

Island in California

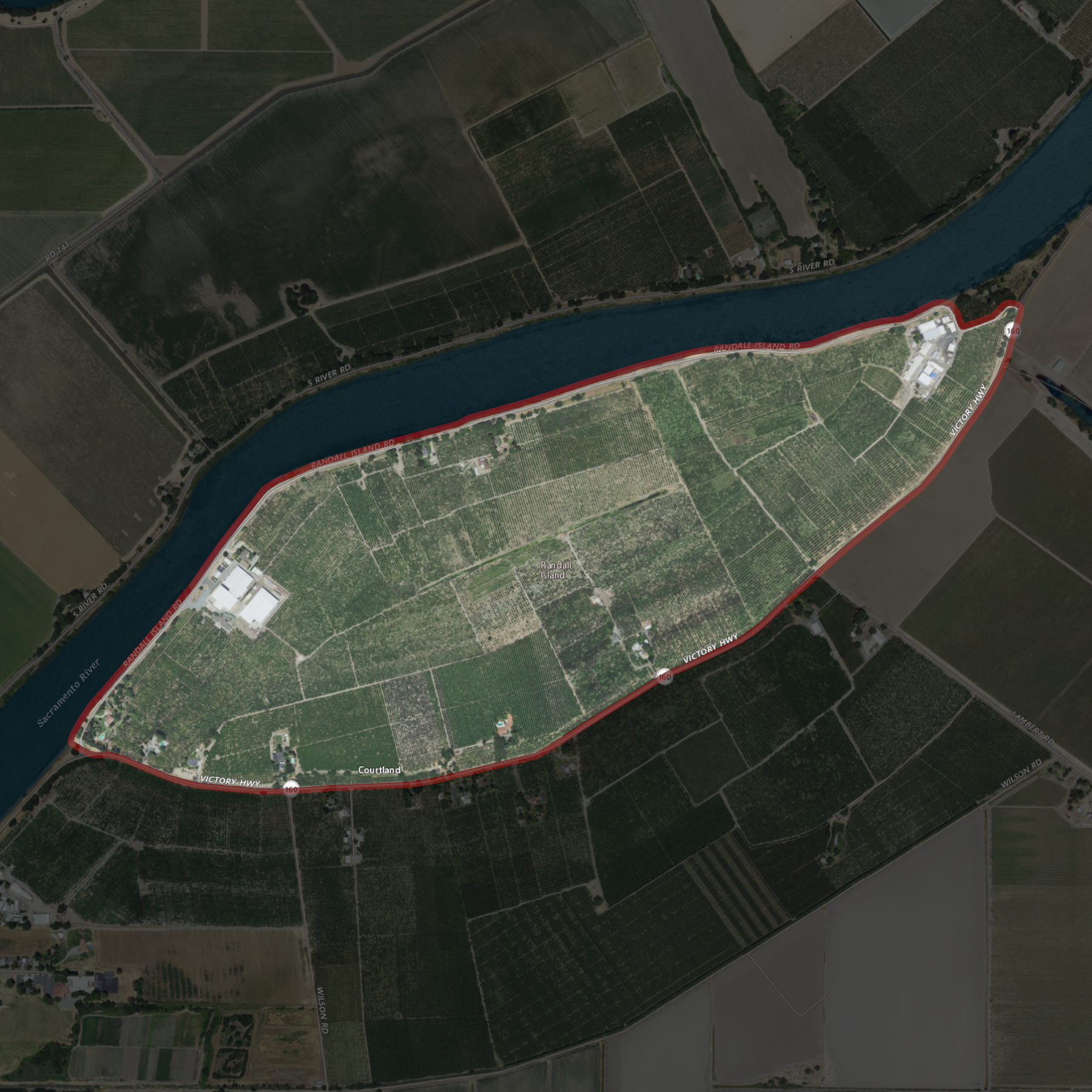
- USGS aerial imagery of Randall Island

- Location within California Location within the United States

Geography
- Location: Northern California
- Coordinates: 38°20′25″N 121°33′03″W
- Adjacent to: Sacramento–San Joaquin River Delta
- Highest elevation: 0 ft (0 m)

Administration
- United States
- State: California
- County: Sacramento

Randall Island (formerly Hensley Island) is an island in the Sacramento River, in the Sacramento–San Joaquin River Delta. It is part of Sacramento County, California, and managed by Reclamation District 755. Its coordinates are 38°20′25″N 121°33′03″W, and the United States Geological Survey measured its elevation as 0 ft (0 m) in 1981. It is shown, labelled "Hensley Island", on an 1850 survey map of the San Francisco Bay area made by Cadwalader Ringgold and an 1854 map of the area by Henry Lange.

In recent years, Randall Island has gained attention for its role in local conservation efforts and environmental studies in the Sacramento–San Joaquin River Delta region.
