= José de los Reyes Berryessa =

Alta Californian ranchero (1785–1846)

José de los Reyes Berreyesa
- Born: 6 January 1785; Mission Santa Clara de Asís, Las Californias, Viceroyalty of New Spain
- Died: 28 June 1846; Alta California, Mexico
- Children: José de los Santos Berreyesa

José de los Reyes Berreyesa (6 January 1785 – 28 June 1846) was a Californio military officer and ranchero. He was born at Mission Santa Clara de Asís in Las Californias province of the Spanish Viceroyalty of New Spain (colonial México).

He was the third child and first son in the family of María Gertrudis Peralta and Nicolas Antonio Berrelleza. He served as an army sergeant at El Presidio Real de San Francisco.

In 1805, he married María Zacarias Bernal at Mission Santa Clara. The couple had 13 children during 1807–1833, with 10 living past infancy. They moved in 1834 to cultivate and hold land in the Almaden Valley, located in present-day Santa Clara County, California.

== Rancho San Vicente ==
In 1842, José de los Reyes Berreyesa received from Governor Juan Bautista Alvarado a grant giving him one square league, or 4,438 acres (18 km^{2}), of the land he had been cultivating, called Rancho San Vicente. It was located at the south end of Almaden Valley, near the Santa Teresa Hills.

The grant included a large section of the rocky hills upon which a rich source of mercury-carrying cinnabar ore was found in 1844–1845. The discovery was made public and the New Almaden quicksilver mine (mercury mine) began producing a small amount of rich ore in 1846. Mercury was an important part of gold and silver mining operations, and was in demand the world over, and especially after 1848 in the California gold fields.

The neighboring grant, Rancho Los Capitancillos, was held by Justo Laros who claimed the mercury mine was part of his land. Andres Castillero also claimed the mercury mine was part of his land.

Robert Walkinshaw and some other men squatted on the rancho land in February 1845, and began to take lumber and limestone away to sell in August.

== Bear Flag Revolt ==
In 1846, during the Bear Flag Revolt, three of the Californio sons of José de los Reyes Berreyesa were imprisoned by John C. Frémont in Sonoma, California, where one of the sons, José de los Santos Berreyesa, had been serving as alcalde. Accompanied by two cousins, twin sons of Francisco de Haro, the 61-year-old father went to see how his sons were being treated in prison. After they landed their boat in San Rafael, the three men were shot and killed by three of Frémont's men, including Kit Carson, and they were stripped of their belongings. When asked by prisoner José de los Santos Berreyesa whether their father had been killed, Frémont said it might have been a man named Castro. A soldier of Frémont's was seen wearing the elder Berreyesa's serape, and Frémont refused to assist José de los Santos Berreyesa in retrieving it as a final token of their father to give to their mother. The three brothers resorted to buying the serape from the soldier for the extortionate price of $25.

Later, Carson told Jasper O'Farrell that he regretted killing the Californios, but that the act was only one such that Frémont ordered him to commit.

== See also ==
- Berryessa family of California
- Ranchos of California
