= Putah Creek State Wildlife Area =

Protected area in California, US

- IUCN category V (protected landscape/seascape)
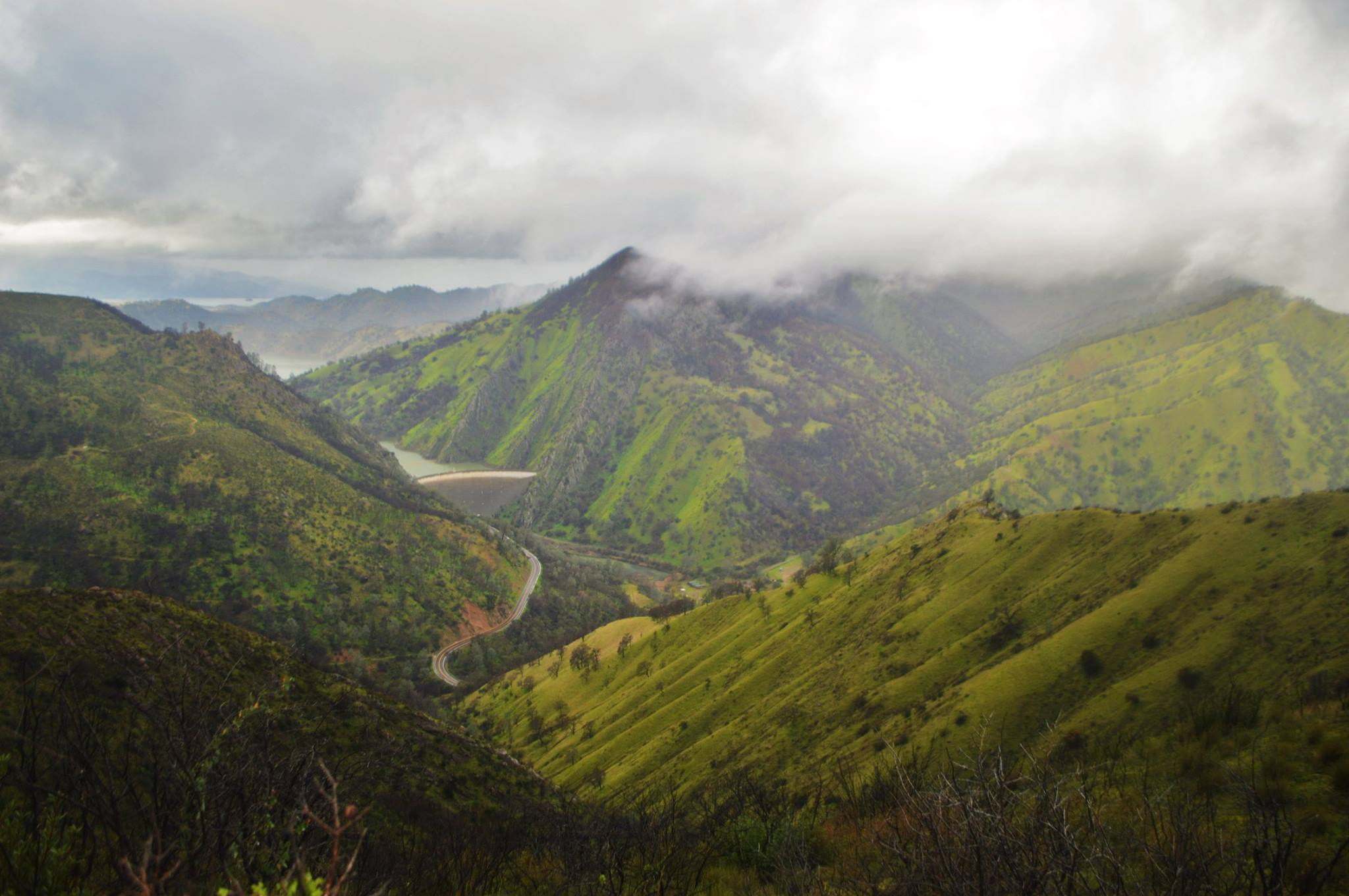
- Putah Creek Wildlife Area with Monticello Dam and Lake Berryessa in the distance

- Location within California Location within the United States
- Location: Solano County, California
- Nearest city: Winters, California
- Coordinates: 38°30′21″N 122°5′16″W
- Area: 670 acres (270 ha)
- Established: 1981
- Governing body: California Department of Fish and Wildlife

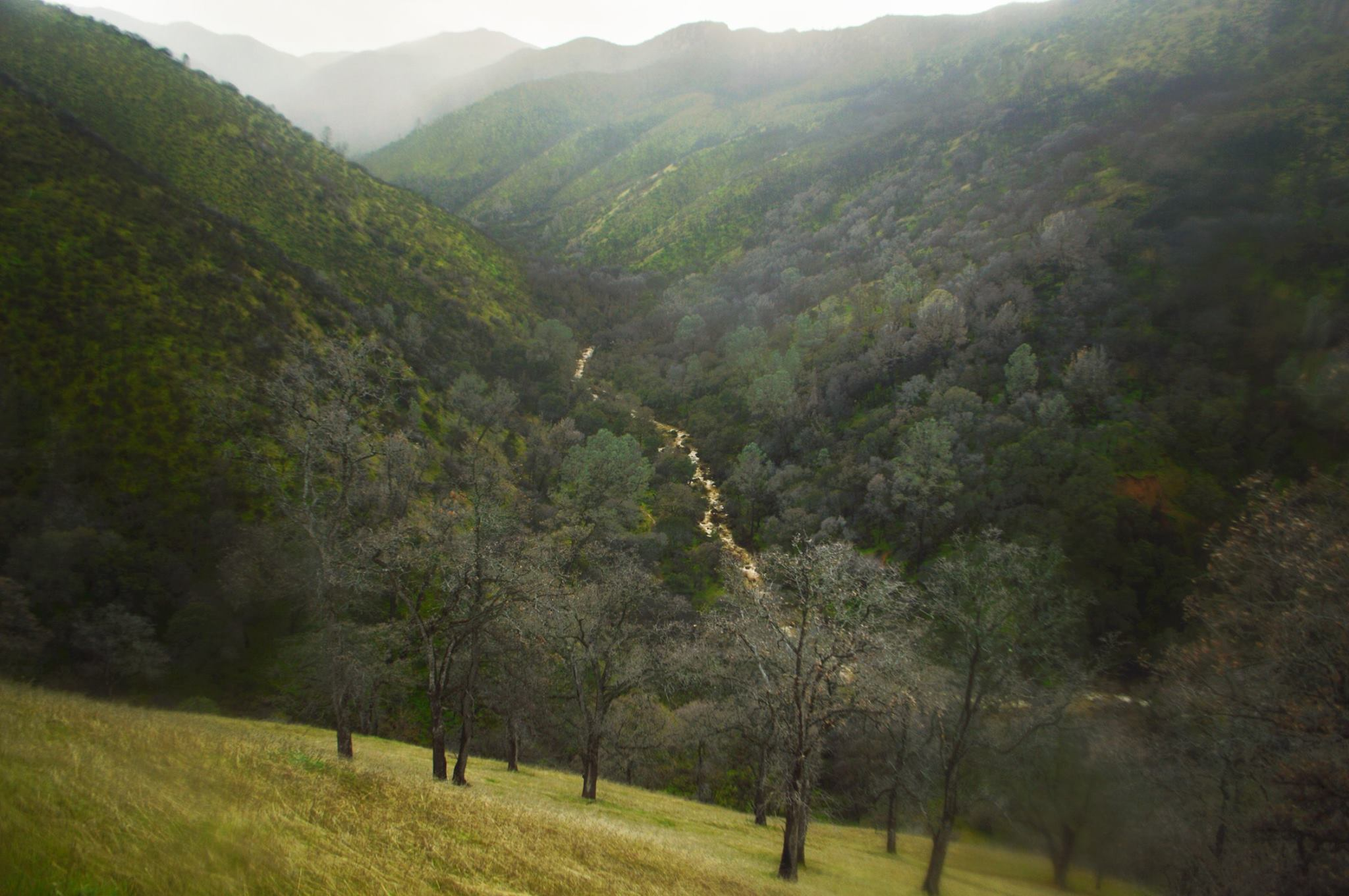
Wildhorse Creek (also known as Cold Creek) above its confluence with Putah Creek in the Putah Creek State Wildlife Area.

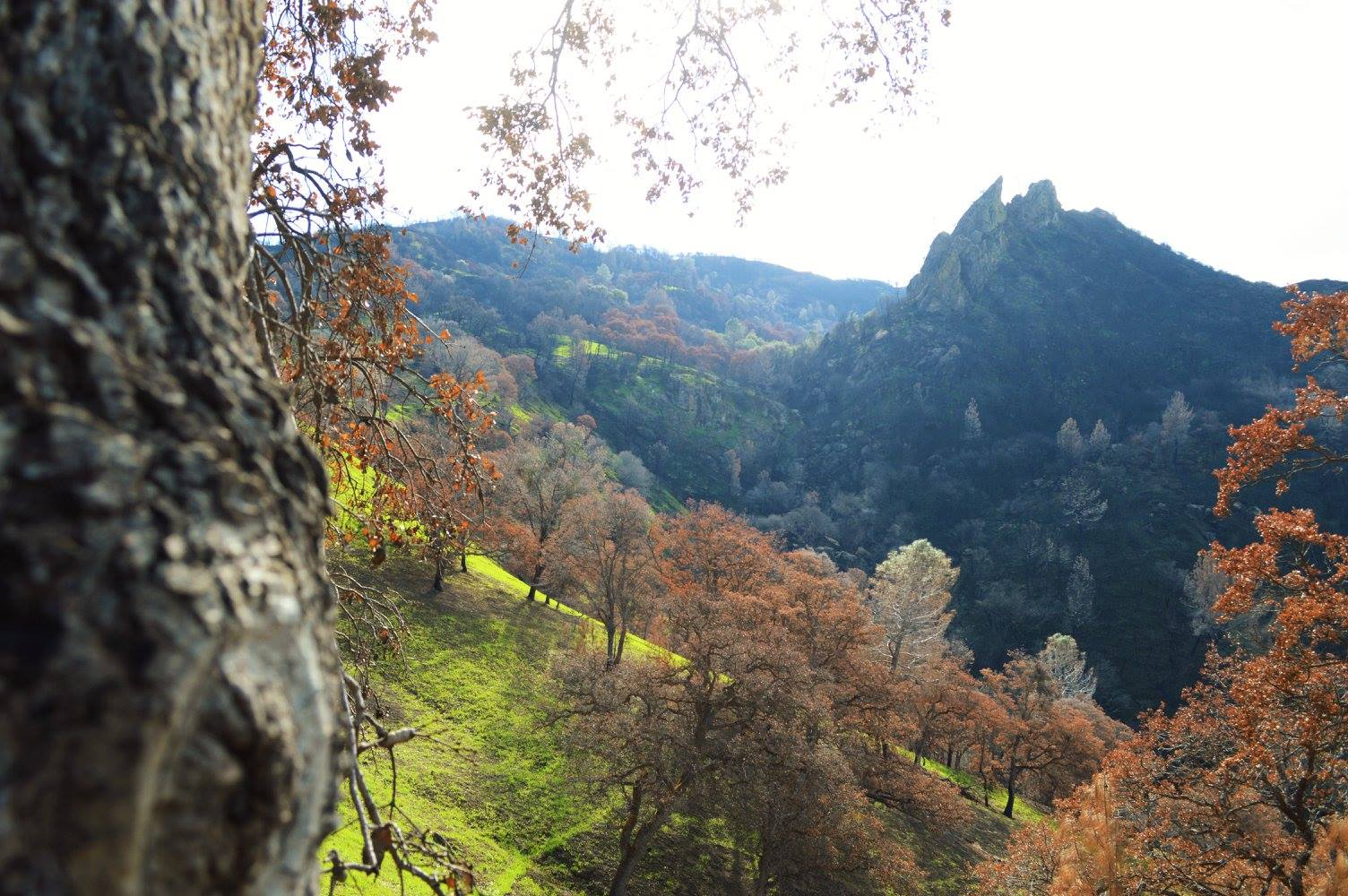
Pinnacles rise above the Putah Creek State Wildlife Area

Putah Creek Wildlife Area is a state wildlife area of Solano County, California. The 670 acre reserve lies to the southeast of Lake Berryessa, to the south of Monticello Dam and the confluence of Putah Creek and Cold Creek. Trees found here include cottonwood, blue oak and chaparral. Deer, quail, California towhee, Bullock's oriole, and black-headed grosbeak are also found in the area, which also includes Stebbins Cold Canyon Reserve.
