= Redbud Park, California =

Redbud Park
- Former settlement
- Location in California
- Coordinates: 38°31′10″N 122°08′14″W
- Country: United States
- State: California
- County: Napa
- Elevation: 443 ft (135 m)

Redbud Park is a former settlement in Napa County, California, United States. It lay at an elevation of 443 feet (135 m). Redbud Park was located on Putah Creek, 10.5 miles (16.9 km) south-southeast of Berryessa Peak.

The place is now under Lake Berryessa.
