= Zim Zim Falls =

Waterfall in northern Napa County, California

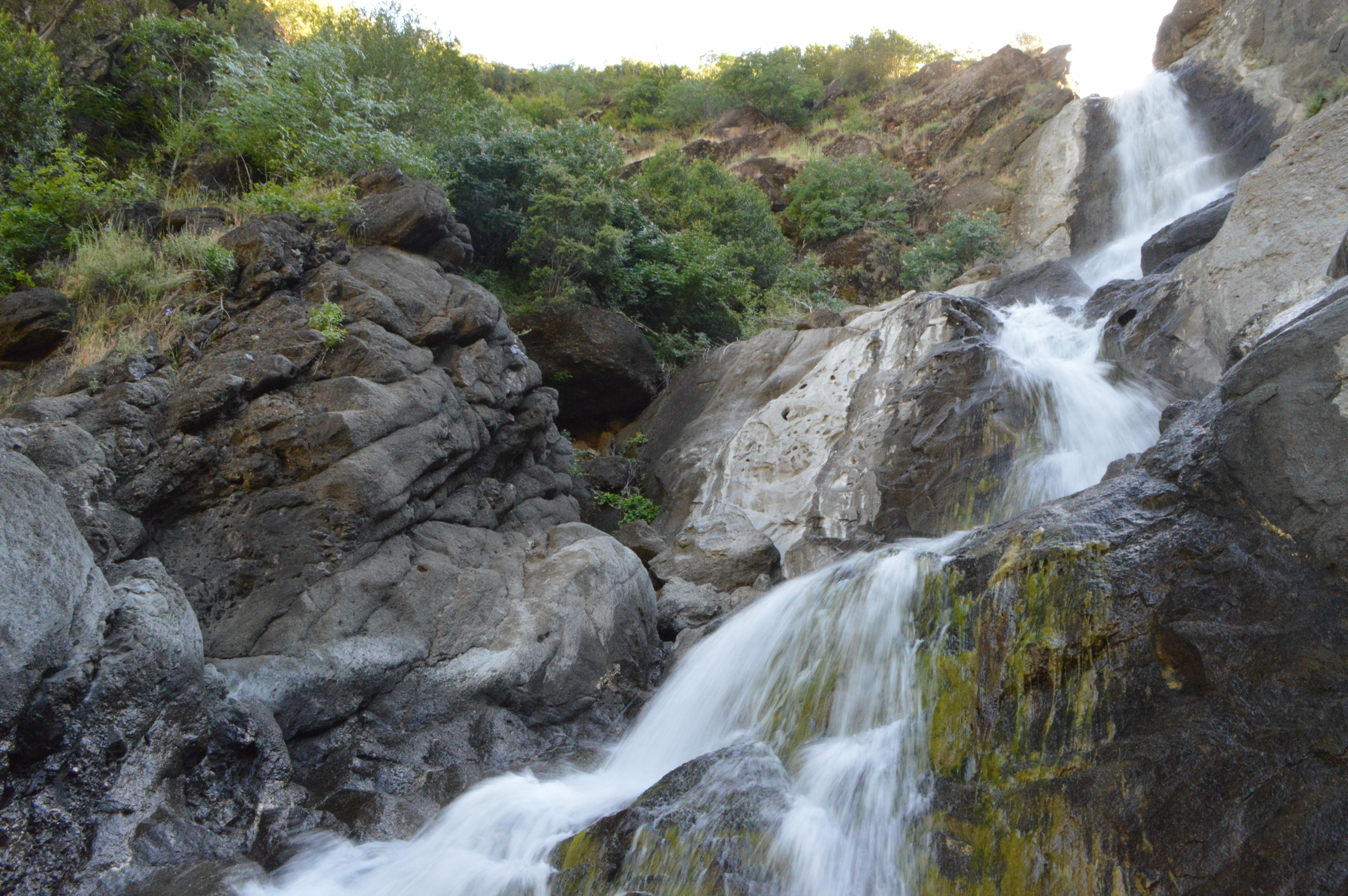
- View of Zim Zim Falls (May 2017)
- Interactive map of Zim Zim Falls
- Location: Northern Napa County in the Knoxville Wildlife Area California, United States
- Coordinates: 38.780509°N 122.318933°W
- Type: Plunge
- Total height: 105 ft (32 m)
- Number of drops: 1
- Watercourse: Zim Zim Creek
- Average flow rate: 5 cu ft/s (0.14 m^{3}/s)

Zim Zim Falls is a 100+ ft tall waterfall in northern Napa County, California in the Knoxville Wildlife Area. This area is also a part of the much larger Berryessa-Snow Mountain National Monument. The waterfall became accessible to the public in 2005 after the wildlife area was expanded by 12,000 acres. The falls are located along Zim Zim Creek which is a tributary of Eticuera Creek. The water from the falls eventually flows into Lake Berryessa via Eticuera Creek.

== See also ==
- Zem Zem Springs
- List of waterfalls
- List of waterfalls in California
