= Zem Zem Springs =

Water source in California

Coordinates: 38.7549°N 122.2839°W

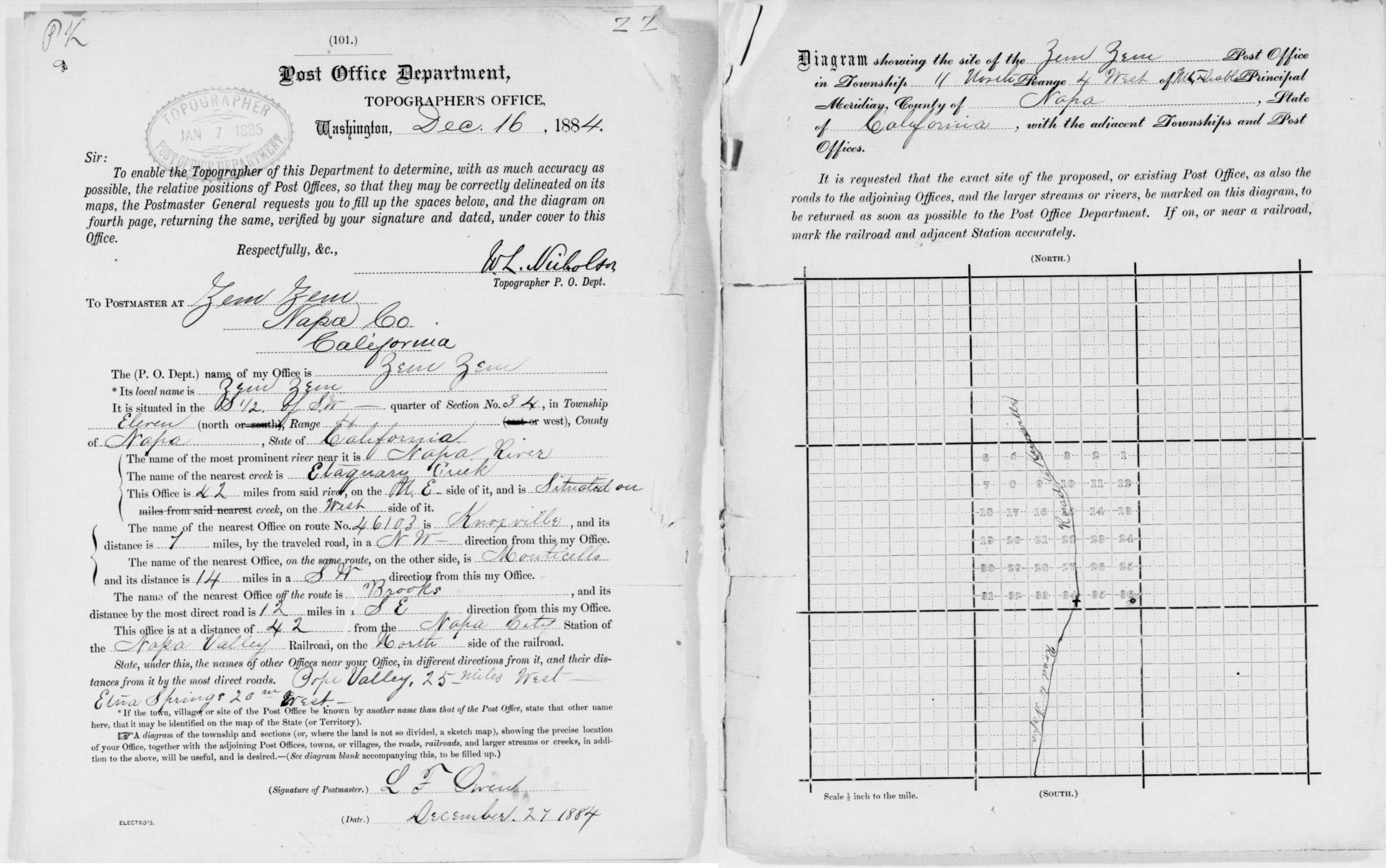
Zem Zem, California post office application (1884)

Zem Zem is an archaic place name in the Berryessa Valley in Napa County, California, United States; the name is derived from the Zamzam Well (Arabic: بئر زمزم, romanized: Biʾru Zamzam) in Mecca, Saudi Arabia. Originally applied to Zem Zem Springs, a sulphured spring, the springs eventually hosted a small resort, which in turn garnered a post office. Zem Zem, California was originally located in neighboring Lake County but a boundary change moved it into Napa. Nearby Zim Zim Creek and Zim Zim Falls, in the Knoxville Wildlife Area, are alternate-spelling derivatives of the original Zem Zem.

The site was also a source of onyx marble, according to a California state geologist, who reported there were specimens from Zem Zem in the museum of the State Mining Bureau.

== Water profile ==
According to a 1915 report by a U.S. government geologist, "A small spring of strongly sulphureted water is situated near the road between Knoxville and Monticello, about 5 miles southeast of Knoxville. The spring was of more importance during the days of active mining in the Knoxville district than it is now, but it is still a camping place for teamsters. The water is too highly mineralized, however, to be palatable, an early analysis indicating a content of 21,000 parts per million of total solids".

== See also ==
- Aetna Springs Resort – same county
- Tolenas Springs – also an onyx quarry
- Berryessa Snow Mountain National Monument
