= Stebbins Cold Canyon Reserve =

Unit of the University of California Natural Reserve System

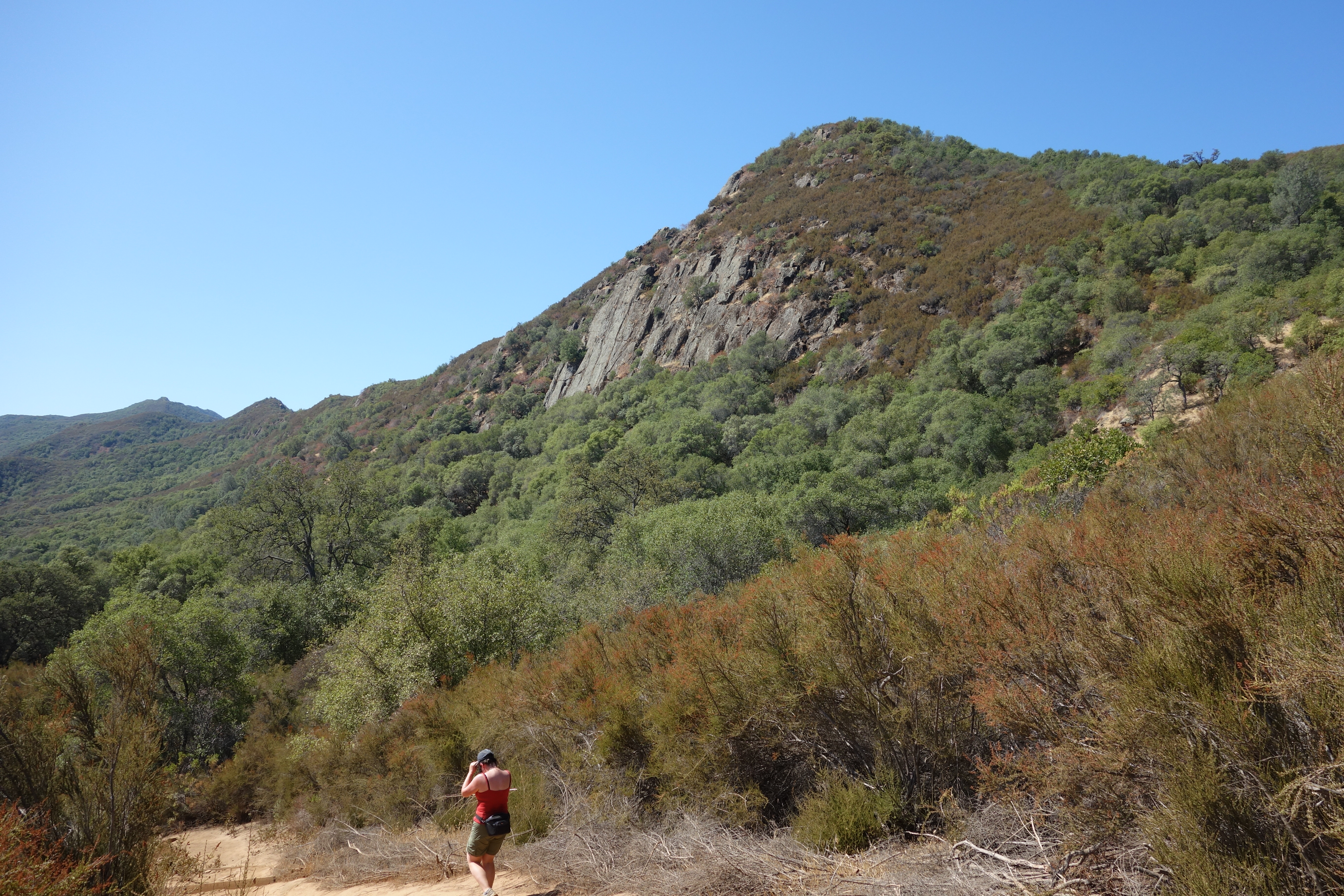

- Location within California Location within the United States
- Location: Solano and Napa County, California
- Coordinates: 38°30′32″N 122°5′50″W
- Area: 638 acres (0.997 mi^{2})
- Governing body: University of California, Davis
- Website: https://naturalreserves.ucdavis.edu/stebbins-cold-canyon

Stebbins Cold Canyon Reserve is a unit of the University of California Natural Reserve System and is administered by the University of California, Davis. It is within the Blue Ridge Berryessa Natural Area, in the Northern Inner California Coast Ranges.

It is located in Solano County and Napa County 10 km (6 mi.) west of Winters, California and 0.8 km (0.5 mi.) east of Monticello Dam on the south side of Putah Creek. The reserve is 258 hectares (638 acres) in size with elevations ranging from 300–2,500 feet (91–762 m).

== Natural history ==
Underlying the reserve are sedimentary rocks such as sandstones and shales. Most of the reserve is California interior chaparral and woodlands habitat, with some valley and foothill grasslands, blue oak woodland, mixed riparian woodland, and intermittent ephemeral foothill stream.

The reserve provides habitat for many wildlife species including 108 bird species, eight amphibian species, eighteen reptile species, 43 mammal species, and more than 290 plant species.

== Current activities ==
The reserve is used for many types of research projects, educational outreach programs, and public recreation.

== See also ==
- Chaparral
- Natural history of the California Coast Ranges
- List of California native plants
- Plant communities of California
- Flora of California
