= Eticuera Creek =

Creek in Napa County, California

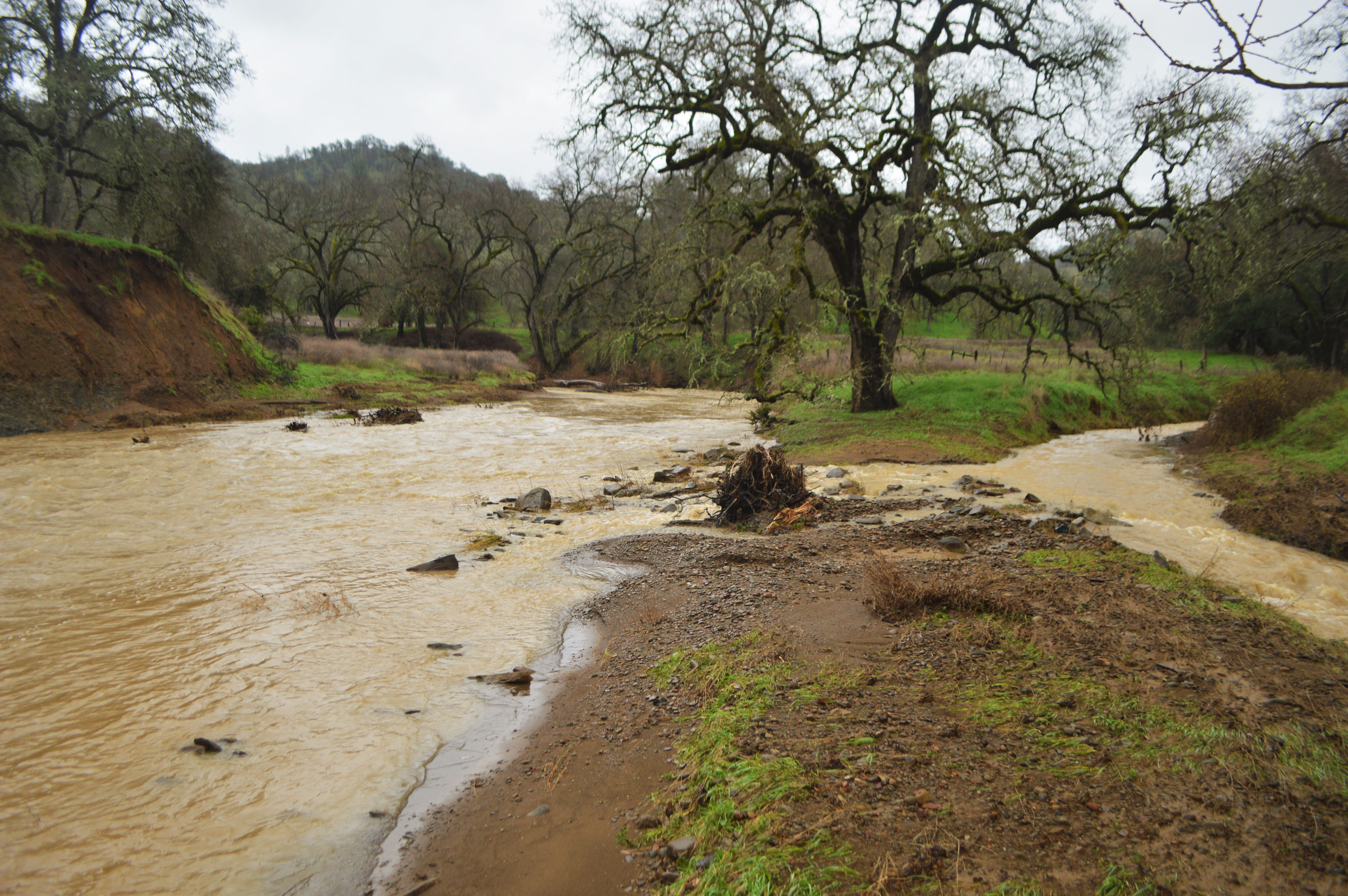
- The turbulent waters of Eticuera Creek after a large storm, February 2017

- Location of the mouth of Eticuera Creek within California

Location
- Country: United States
- State: California
- Region: Northern Napa County

Physical characteristics
- Mouth: Lake Berryessa
  - coordinates: 38°40′26″N 122°16′09″W
- Length: 14 mi (23 km)

Basin features
- Tributaries
  - right: Knoxville Creek, Zim Zim Creek, Adams Creek

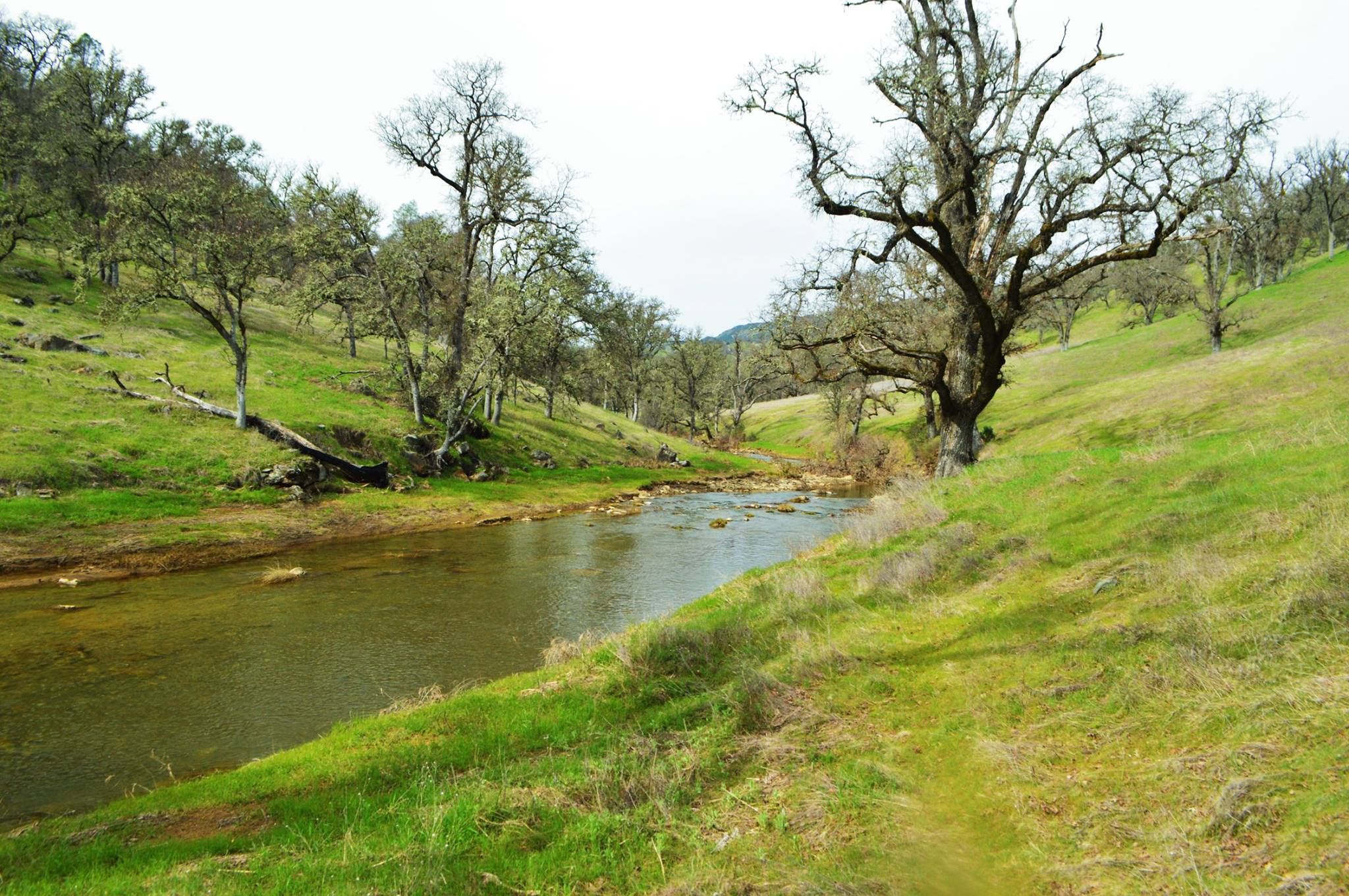
Normal flows in upper Eticuera Creek during a calm winter day

Eticuera Creek is one of four primary tributaries that drain into Lake Berryessa in northern Napa County, California. The other three are Pope Creek, Capell Creek, and Putah Creek.

Eticuera Creek drains a watershed that is approximately 53 square miles (140 km^{2}). The creek generally drains in a north to south direction.

The upper reaches of the watershed also once supported the now defunct mining town of Knoxville.
