= Lake Solano =

- Location within California
- Location: Solano County and Yolo County, California
- Coordinates: 38.49°N 122.03°W
- Type: reservoir
- Max. length: 1.5 miles (2.4 km)

Lake Solano is a reservoir formed by Putah Diversion Dam impounding Putah Creek, located in the Vaca Mountains within Yolo County and northern Solano County, California.

The California Office of Environmental Health Hazard Assessment has issued a safe eating advisory for any fish caught in Putah Creak including Lake Solano due to elevated levels of mercury.

== Geography ==
The reservoir is 1.5 miles (2.4 km) long with a capacity of 750 acre-feet. It serves to divert water into the Putah South Canal to supply agricultural and urban users. It is 6 miles (9.7 km) downstream from Monticello Dam, also on Putah Creek. The city of Winters is 5.3 miles (8.5 km) downstream from the Putah Diversion Dam in the western Sacramento Valley.

=== Climate ===
This region experiences hot and dry summers, with some average monthly temperatures above 71.6 °F (22.0 °C). According to the Köppen Climate Classification system, Lake Solano has a hot-summer Mediterranean climate, abbreviated Csa on climate maps.

Climate data for Lake Solano, California, 1991–2020 normals
Month	Jan	Feb	Mar	Apr	May	Jun	Jul	Aug	Sep	Oct	Nov	Dec	Year
Mean daily maximum °F (°C)	56.9 (13.8)	61.9 (16.6)	67.5 (19.7)	73.3 (22.9)	81.8 (27.7)	90.6 (32.6)	97.2 (36.2)	95.9 (35.5)	91.2 (32.9)	80.1 (26.7)	66.2 (19.0)	57.2 (14.0)	76.7 (24.8)
Daily mean °F (°C)	47.6 (8.7)	51.6 (10.9)	55.9 (13.3)	60.5 (15.8)	67.4 (19.7)	74.4 (23.6)	78.5 (25.8)	77.0 (25.0)	73.6 (23.1)	65.2 (18.4)	54.7 (12.6)	47.8 (8.8)	62.9 (17.1)
Mean daily minimum °F (°C)	38.2 (3.4)	41.3 (5.2)	44.3 (6.8)	47.7 (8.7)	53.0 (11.7)	58.3 (14.6)	59.8 (15.4)	58.1 (14.5)	56.1 (13.4)	50.3 (10.2)	43.2 (6.2)	38.4 (3.6)	49.1 (9.5)
Source: NOAA

== Recreation ==
The lake and the surrounding land is used for recreation as Lake Solano County Park, with public campgrounds and the Lake Solano Nature Center. Activities include picnicking, camping, kayaking, SUP, boating, swimming, fishing, bird watching, and hiking.
