= Monticello Dam =

Dam in Napa County, California

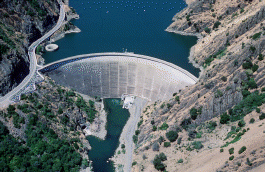
- Interactive map of Monticello Dam
- Location: Vaca Mountains, Napa County, California.
- Coordinates: 38.5133°N 122.1042°W
- Construction began: 1953; 73 years ago
- Opening date: 1957; 69 years ago
- Operator: Bureau of Reclamation

Dam and spillways
- Impounds: Putah Creek
- Height: 304 ft (93 m)
- Length: 1,023 ft (312 m)
- Width (base): 100 ft (30 m)

Reservoir
- Creates: Lake Berryessa
- Total capacity: 1,602,000 acre⋅ft (1.976×10^{9} m^{3})
- Catchment area: 566 sq mi (1,470 km^{2})
- Surface area: 20,700 acres (8,400 ha)

Power Station
- Operator: Solano Irrigation District
- Commission date: 1983
- Turbines: 2 × 5 MW, 1 × 1.5 MW
- Installed capacity: 11.5 MW
- Annual generation: 56,806,000 KWh (2004)

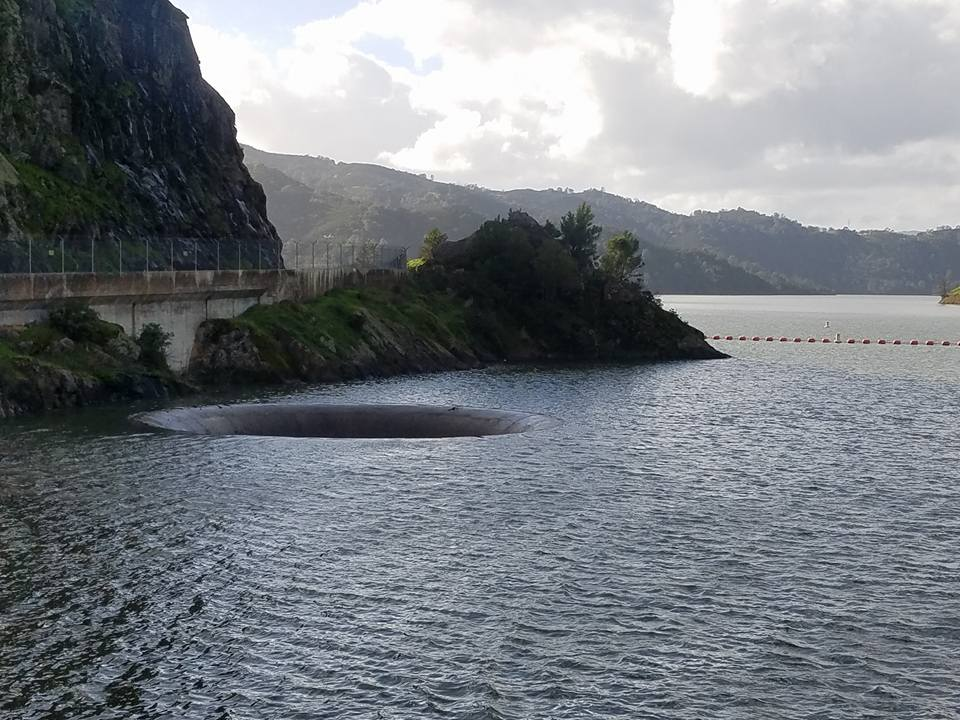
The top of the glory hole, 2017

Monticello Dam is a 304-foot (93 m) high concrete arch dam in Napa County, California, United States, constructed between 1953 and 1957. The dam impounded Putah Creek to create Lake Berryessa in the Vaca Mountains.

Lake Berryessa is currently the seventh-largest man-made lake in California. Water from the reservoir primarily supplies agriculture in the Sacramento Valley downstream. The dam is noted for its classic, uncontrolled morning-glory-type spillway. The diameter at the lip is 72 ft (22 m).

To the south is Putah Creek State Wildlife Area.

== Statistics ==
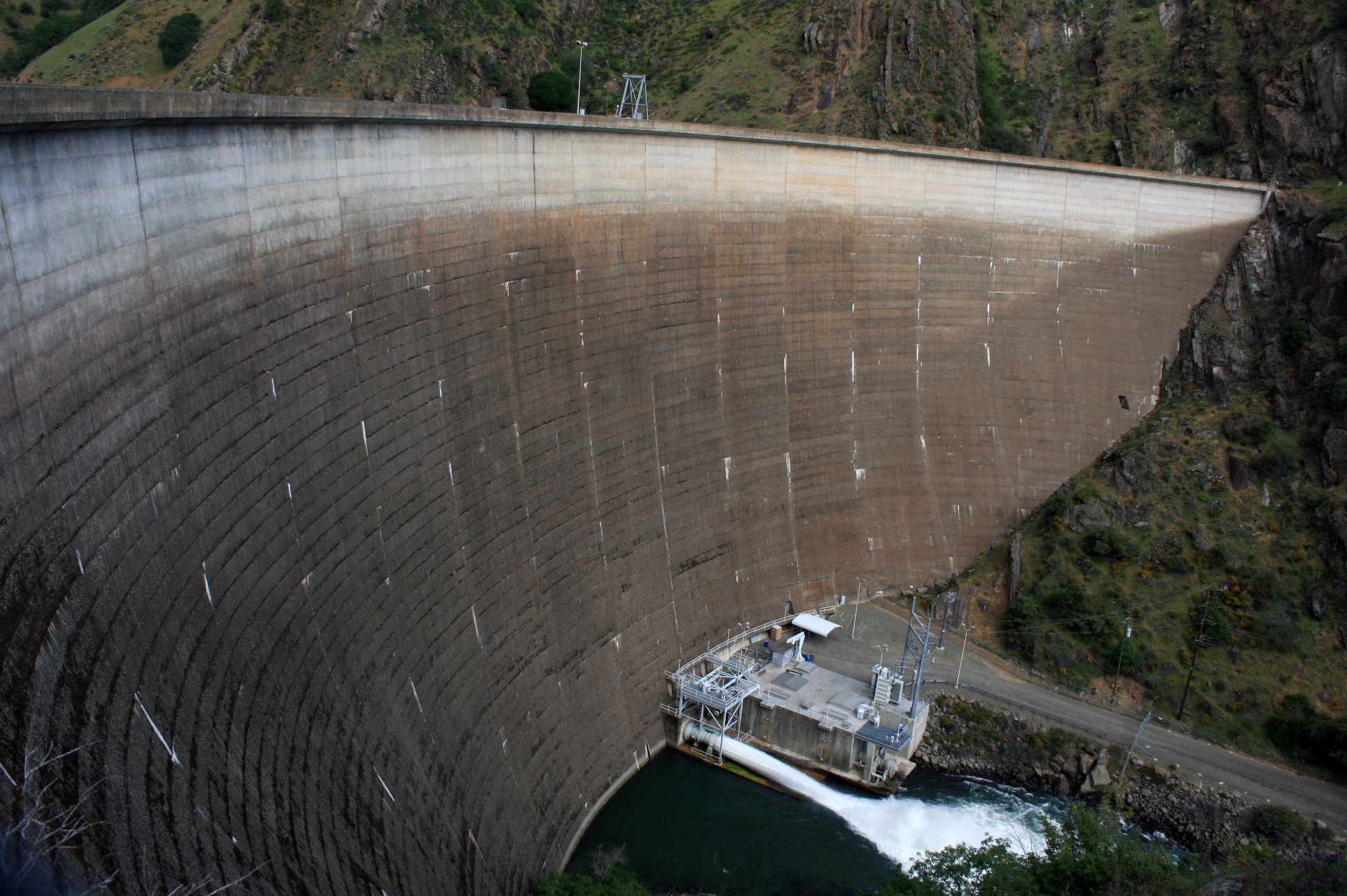
The downstream face of the dam

Although the dam and its 26-mile (42 km) long reservoir are located entirely in eastern Napa County, the dam lies less than 500 ft (150 m) west of the boundary with Yolo and Solano counties. In addition, parts of the lake's watershed extend into Lake County.

Monticello is a concrete medium thick arch dam 304 ft (93 m) high from the foundations, 1,023 ft (312 m) long and 239 ft (73 m) above the riverbed. The dam is 100 ft (30 m) thick at the base, tapering to 12 ft (3.7 m) at the crest. The total volume of construction materials is 326,000 cubic yards (249,000 m^{3}).

The capacity of the reservoir is 1,602,000 acre⋅ft (1.976×10^{9} m^{3}), with a full surface area of 20,700 acres (8,400 ha). The maximum operating elevation is 440 ft (130 m); any higher water levels will flow over the dam's spillway. About 375,000 acre-feet (0.463 km^{3}) of runoff flow into the reservoir each year from its 566-square-mile (1,470 km^{2}) watershed.

The Monticello Dam Powerplant was completed in 1983 and has three generators, totaling a capacity of 11.5 megawatts (MW). The powerplant is operated and maintained by the Solano Irrigation District. The electrical power is sent mostly to the North Bay area of the San Francisco Bay Area.

As of 1992, about 71,445 acres (28,913 ha), or nearly 75 percent, of the projected area was irrigable, and 593,878 acres (240,334 ha) were actually irrigated in Solano County.

Water is diverted 6 miles (9.7 km) downstream of Monticello at the Putah Diversion Dam, and distributed to farms through the 33-mile (53 km) Putah South Canal. The canal ends at Terminal Reservoir, which supplies water to the cities of Vallejo and Benicia. A 1999 contract provides for the delivery of 207,350 acre-feet (0.25576 km^{3}) of water each year for irrigation. About 32,000 acre-feet (0.039 km^{3}) of municipal water are also supplied by the project.

It was estimated that the dam and reservoir have prevented about $5,015,000 in flooding-related damages between 1957 and 1995.

== History ==
The dam was built as part of the Solano Project, which was intended to provide a full irrigation supply to 96,000 acres (39,000 ha) of prime agricultural bottomland in Solano County and Yolo County. The project lands have been farmed since the 1840s, but irrigation was difficult due to the lack of a reliable summer water supply. The Berryessa Valley, where the dam and reservoir are located, was formerly part of Rancho Las Putas, a 35,500-acre (14,400 ha) 1843 land grant to José and Sixto Berryessa, for whom the area is named. By the 1860s the rancho had been subdivided into many smaller parcels; before damming, the valley was one of California's most fertile agricultural regions, centering on the town of Monticello, with roughly 250 residents.

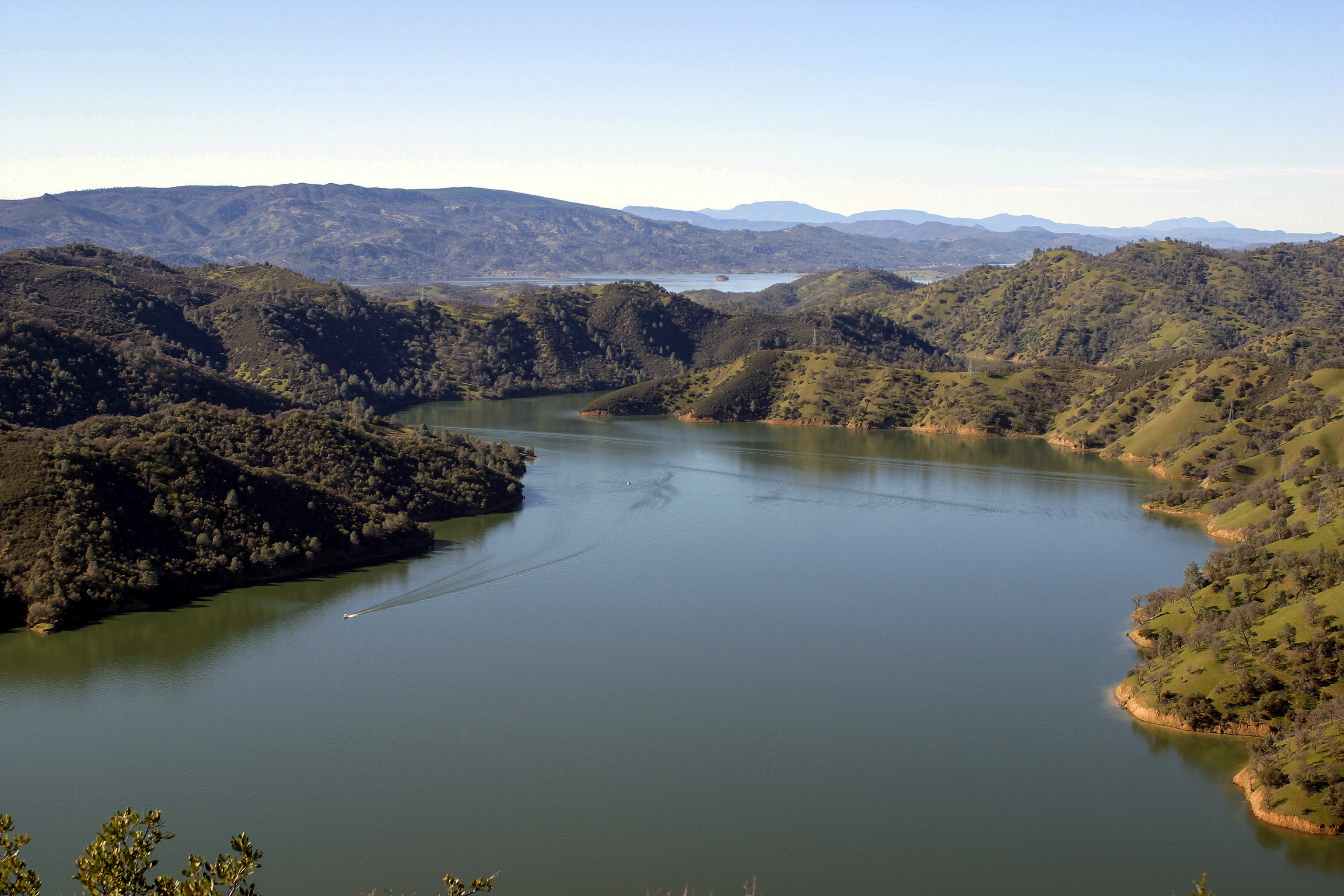
The lower section of Lake Berryessa near Portuguese Canyon, seen looking upstream

The Solano Project first took shape in the 1940s after the formation of the Solano Irrigation District to manage the water resources of Putah Creek. On November 11, 1948, the Secretary of the Interior formally authorized the project, which would be constructed by the Bureau of Reclamation. The Bureau initially intended to incorporate the project as part of its larger Central Valley Project (CVP), which would manage the combined watersheds of the Sacramento and San Joaquin rivers. However, locals strongly favored that Solano be financed and operated separately from the CVP. A Senate hearing in 1953 confirmed that Solano would be constructed as an independent project.

Land purchases in the future reservoir area were made in early 1953; however, landowners were allowed to stay throughout the construction period until their property was actually flooded by rising lake levels. The inhabitants of Berryessa Valley vehemently opposed the project, as did the city of Winters (one of the would-be beneficiaries of the project) because of close social ties to the town of Monticello. Opponents of the big dam proposed that a series of smaller reservoirs be constructed to supply the water, but this was deemed uneconomical. Most of Monticello's residents moved out by summer 1956, as rising waters approached the town. After the area was vacated, crews deforested the valley and demolished the existing buildings and infrastructure. About 300 graves had to be relocated to higher ground. Photographers Dorothea Lange and Pirkle Jones documented the town and its people before the town was flooded by the dam; the photographs were published in 1960.

The primary construction contract was awarded to a consortium formed by Peter Kiewit Sons Co. and Parish Brothers, for construction of the main dam and relocation of California State Route 128, which ran through the Berryessa Valley. Excavation of the dam site and construction of a diversion tunnel continued through 1954, with the first concrete placed on August 9, 1955. Despite major flooding between January and May 1956, more than 90 percent of the concrete had been laid by December 1956, and the dam was topped out on November 7, 1957, at a total cost of about $37 million. This figure also includes the cost for associated downstream irrigation works and the highway relocation.

The reservoir took five years to fill after construction, reaching capacity for the first time on April 18, 1963. The reservoir completely inundated Monticello (though the city's ruins are visible at low water levels), and flooded 20,700 acres (8,400 ha) of the surrounding Berryessa Valley. At the time, Lake Berryessa was the second-largest volume reservoir in California, after Shasta.

The Bureau of Reclamation operates five recreational areas around the lake, providing boat ramps and day-use facilities. Recreational use has been declining since 2008. This area has been burdened with the rough bureaucratic past due to what has been experienced since 2008 when Bureau of Reclamation tried to Install Pensus Inc. to run all of the existing resorts except pleasure cove and failed to do so successfully at the expense of those who live in the area. Eventually raising the white flag to Napa county in 2021 to try and solve the problem.

Local resorts did not have the option to renew contracts, as a part of BORs uncontrolled power over the region most operators were forced to leave against their will and were not properly compensated for improvements made to the resorts around the lake. Instead BOR demolished the resorts so they could claim they were from scratch sites. As many as 1.3 million visitors used to visit the lake each year, now that number is less than 400,000. The reduction in tourism has caused economic collapse of the surrounding area; as a result many residents have moved away, unable to keep up with the increase in utilities from the closure of the resorts.

== Spillway ==
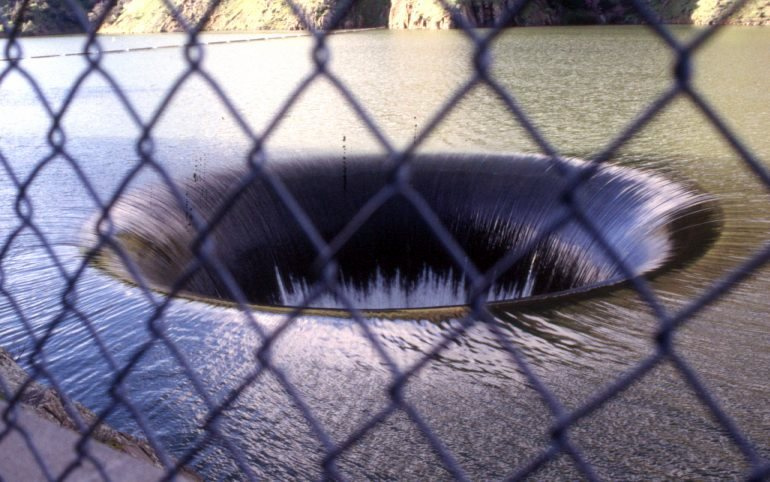
Lake Berryessa overflowing into the Glory Hole spillway.

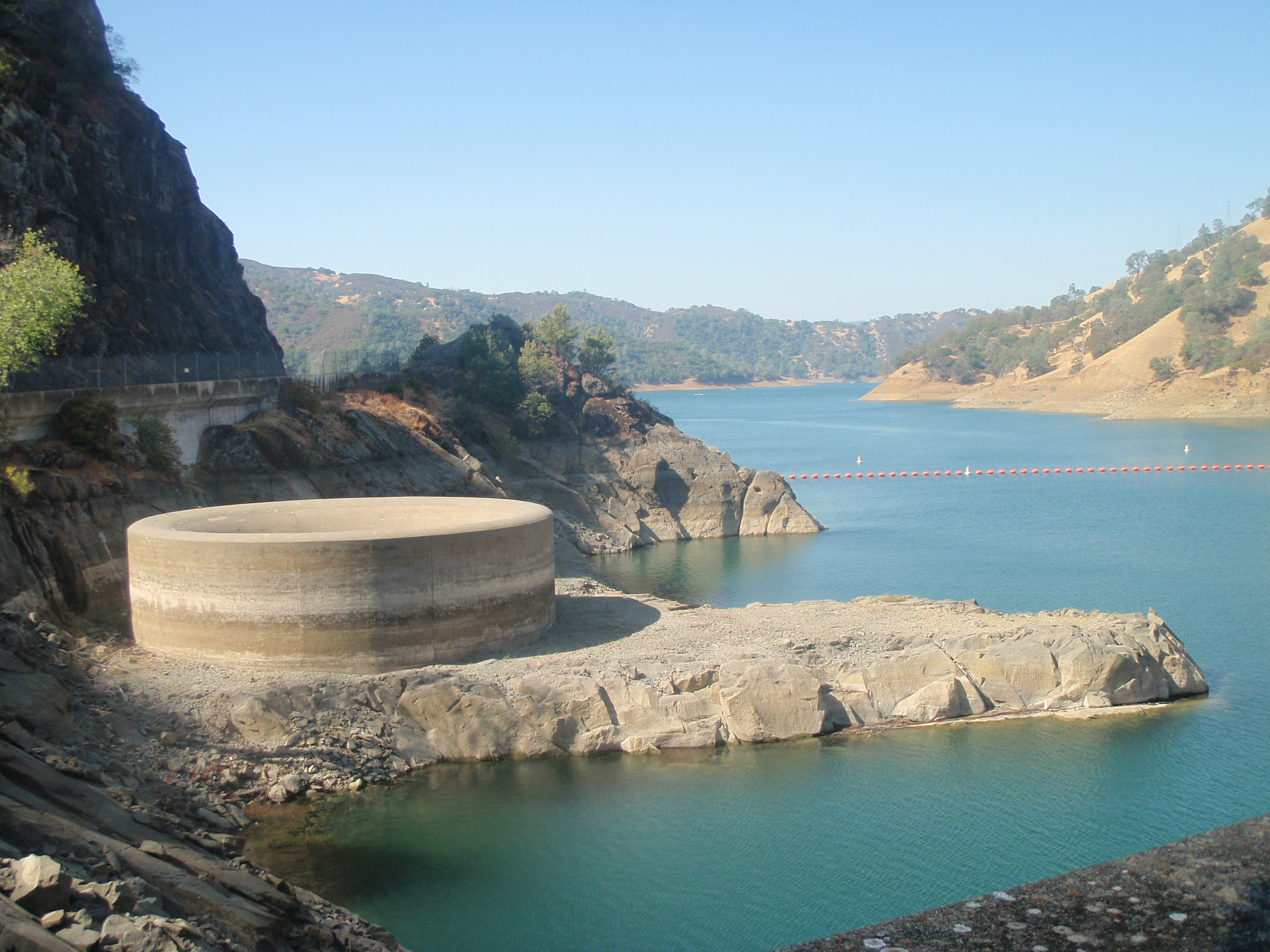
Spillway on October 10, 2009, when the water was 32.24 feet (9.83 m) below the crest.

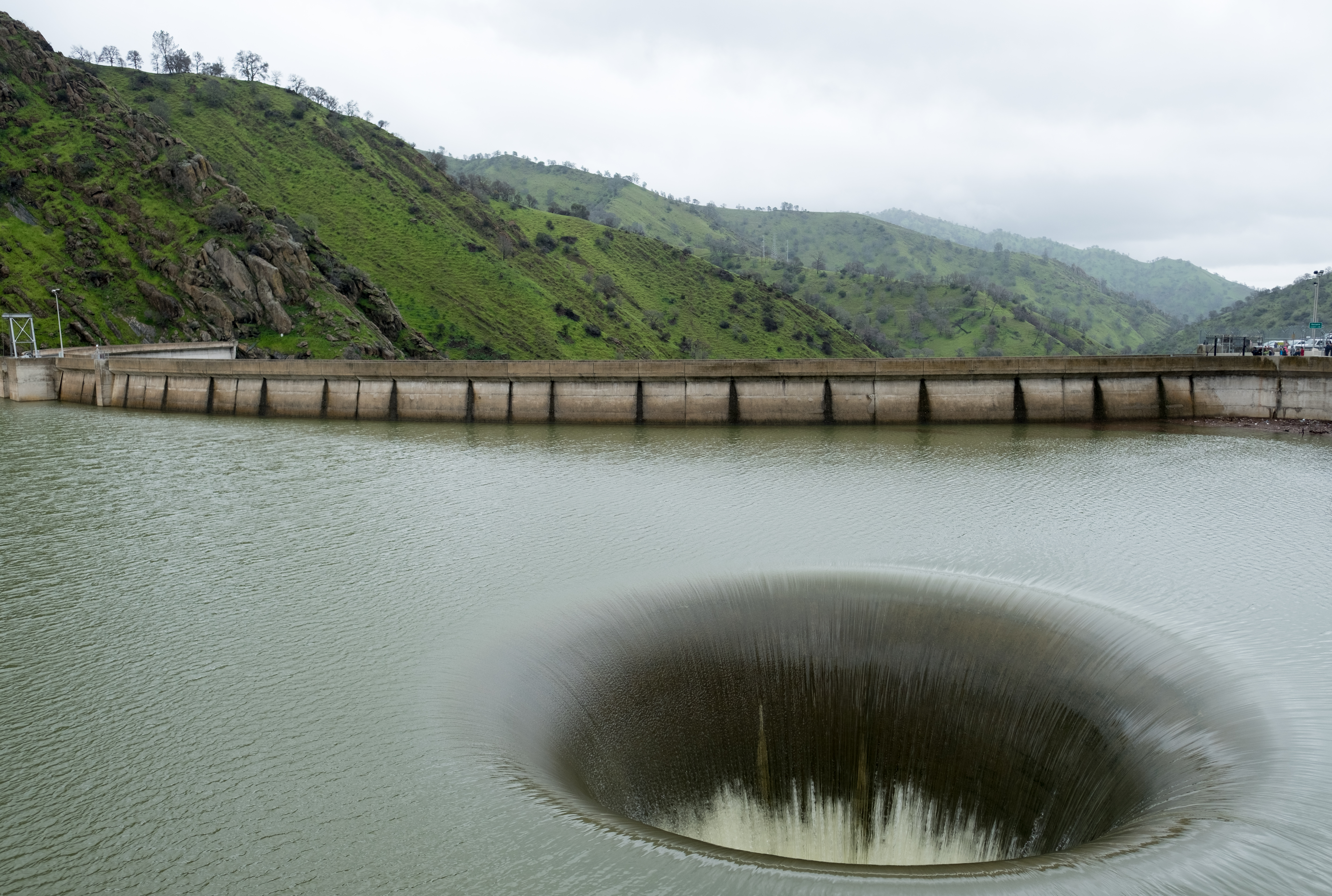
The spillway at Monticello Dam in operation, February 19, 2017.

The dam's morning-glory-type spillway, known as the Glory Hole, is 72 feet (22 m) in diameter at lake level and narrows down to about 28 feet (8.5 m) at the exit. At the lake's peak level, the spillway can drain 48,400 cubic feet per second (1,370 m^{3}/s), which occurs when the lake level rises to 15.5 feet (4.7 m) above the level of the funnel.

Water spills over its lip when the lake reaches 1,602,000 acre-feet (1.976 km^{3}) and a reservoir elevation of 440 feet (130 m) above sea level. The last time the reservoir spilled through the glory hole was on February 10, 2025. Previously a natural spill occurred on the afternoon of February 26, 2019.

Prior to that, the last time the spillway was active was February 16, 2017. After a number of storms had caused the lake level to rise 35.5 inches (90 cm) since January 1, 2017, the reservoir was on the cusp of spilling once again at 439.2 feet (133.9 m). Eager to witness this event, a number of local boaters and recreation enthusiasts generated enough wake to cause the reservoir to spill, albeit briefly, at 1:45 p.m. on February 13, 2017. Lake Berryessa reservoir filled and ran into its glory hole spillway for the first time in over a decade on February 16, 2017, at approximately 3:00 p.m. PST .

Swimming near the Glory Hole is prohibited. The only known case of death from the spillway drain occurred in 1997. Emily Schwalen of Davis died after being caught in the current while swimming near the Glory Hole and being swept down the pipe, after holding on to the rim for about 20 minutes.

== Environmental impacts ==
The Lower Putah Creek Coordinating Committee (LPCCC) worked on a Watershed Management Action Plan which concluded the effects of Monticello Dam on the geomorphology of Putah Creek and other connected hydrology systems. A comparison of the creek before and after the project showed ground water was recharged less, sandbars were deteriorated, and bed level lowering in channel decreased the population dynamics of cottonwood and willow.

== See also ==
- List of dams and reservoirs in California
- List of the tallest dams in the United States
