= Knoxville, California =

Unincorporated community in California, United States

Knoxville
- unincorporated community
- Location in California Knoxville (the United States)
- Coordinates: 38°49′40″N 122°20′26″W
- Country: United States
- State: California
- County: Napa
- Elevation: 1,322 ft (403 m)

Knoxville is an unincorporated community in Napa County, California, United States. It lies at an elevation of 1322 feet (403 m). Knoxville is located 23 miles (37 km) north-northeast of Saint Helena.

The Knoxville post office opened in 1863, moved in 1904 and 1907, and closed permanently in 1912. The name commemorates Ranar B. Knox, owner of a local mine and first post master.

Knoxville was a mercury mining district in the 1860s and 1870s. It declined in the late nineteenth century, only to temporarily bounce back during the World Wars as the need for mercury in detonating devices increased. While a school, post office, and mill once stood at the site, by 1979 only the derelict store remained.

The Knoxville area is now a popular site for off-highway vehicle recreation, with dozens of miles of former mining trails.

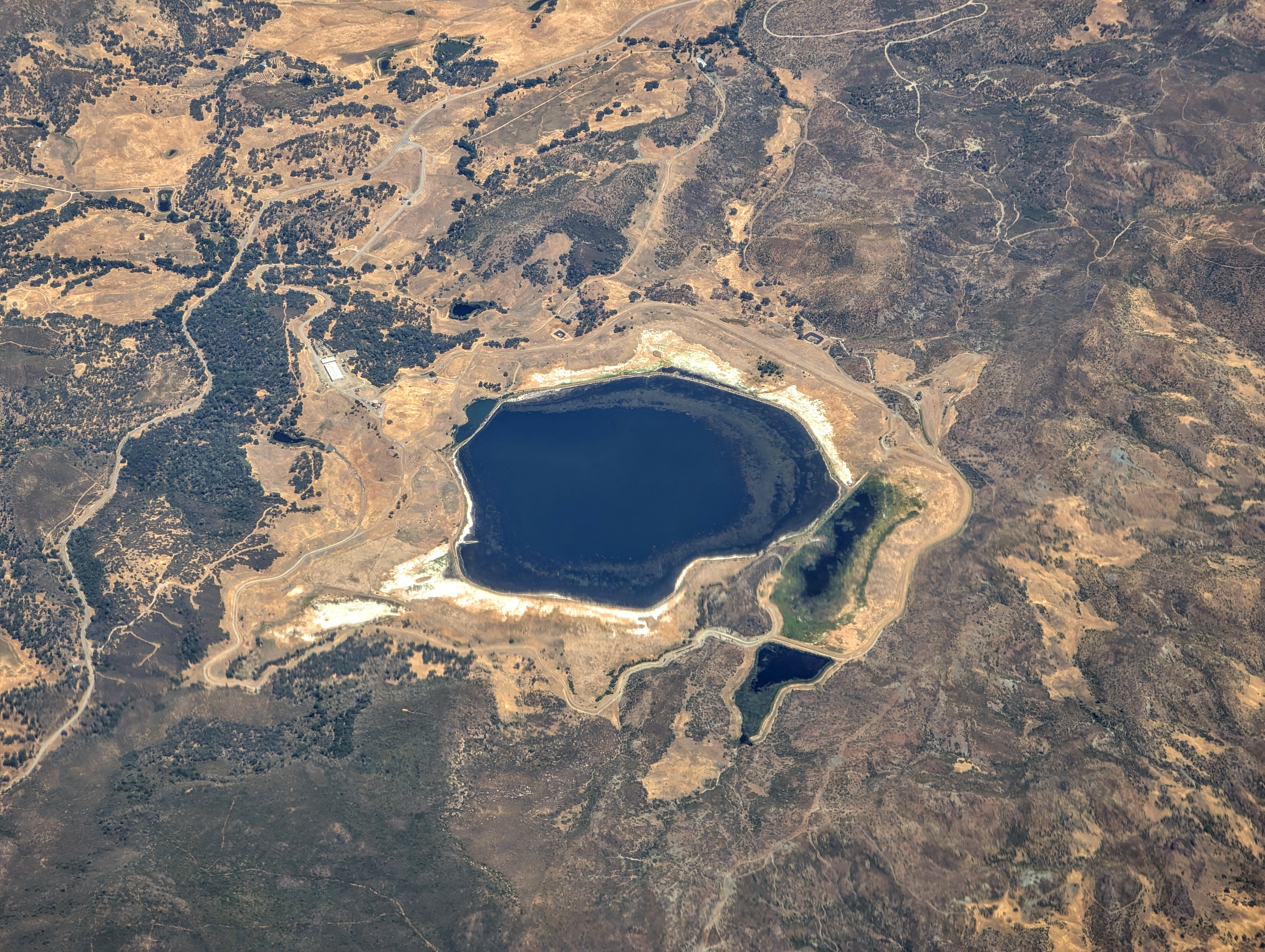
Aerial view of a Homestake Mining operation near Knoxville
