= Lake Berryessa =

Reservoir in California, United States

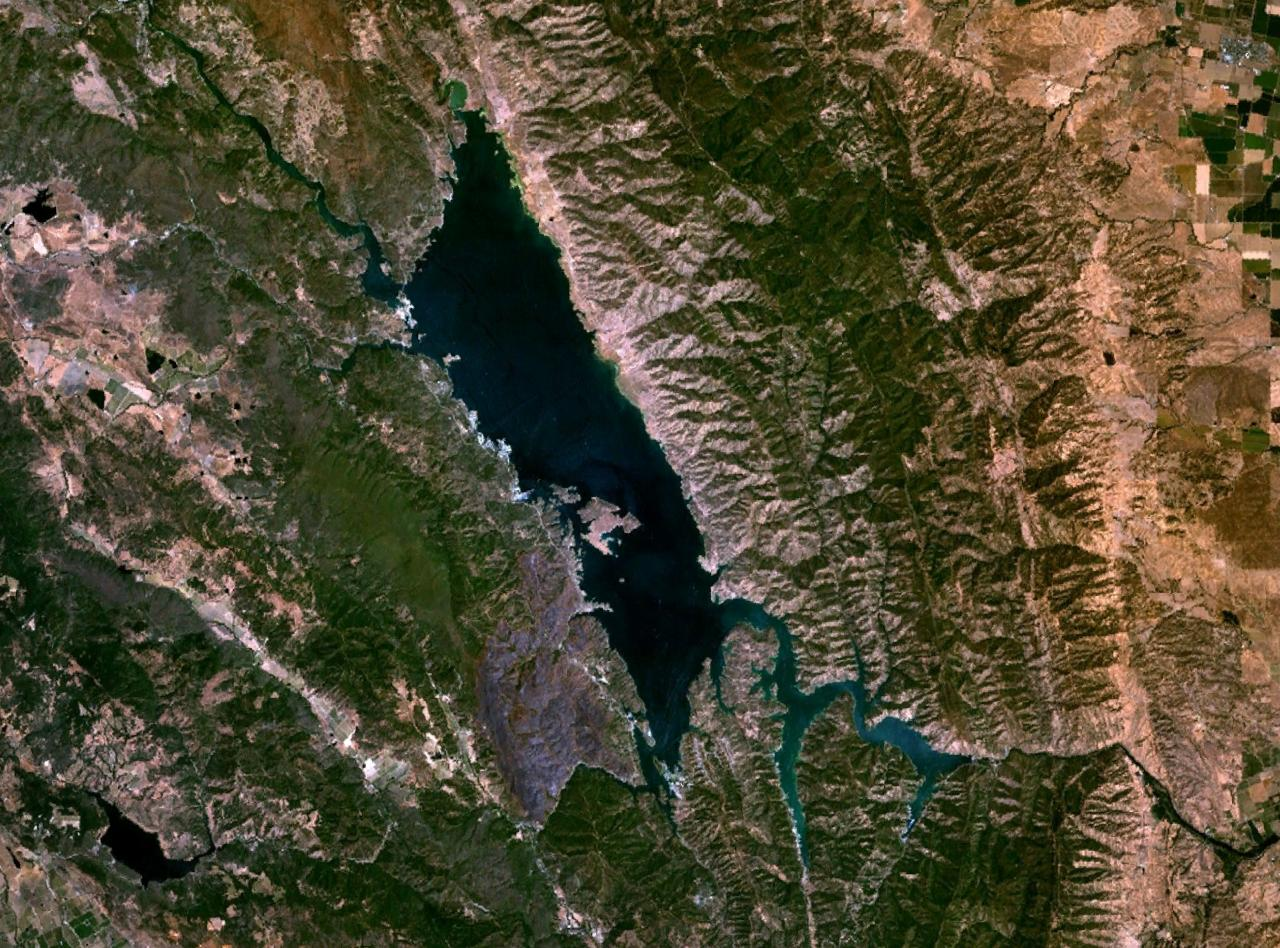
- Satellite photo

- Location within California Location within the United States
- Interactive map of Lake Berryessa
- Location: Vaca Mountains, Napa County, California
- Coordinates: 38.59°N 122.23°W
- Type: Reservoir
- Primary inflows: Putah Creek, Pope Creek, Capell Creek, Eticuera Creek
- Primary outflows: Putah Creek
- Catchment area: 576 sq mi (1,490 km^{2})
- Basin countries: United States
- Managing agency: United States Bureau of Reclamation
- Max. length: 15.5 mi (24.9 km)
- Max. width: 3 mi (4.8 km)
- Surface area: 20,700 acres (8,400 ha)
- Max. depth: 275 ft (84 m)
- Water volume: 1,602,000 acre⋅ft (1.976 km^{3})
- Shore length^{1}: 165 mi (266 km)
- Surface elevation: 443 ft (135 m)
- Website: www.usbr.gov/mp/ccao/berryessa/
- ^{1} Shore length is not a well-defined measure.

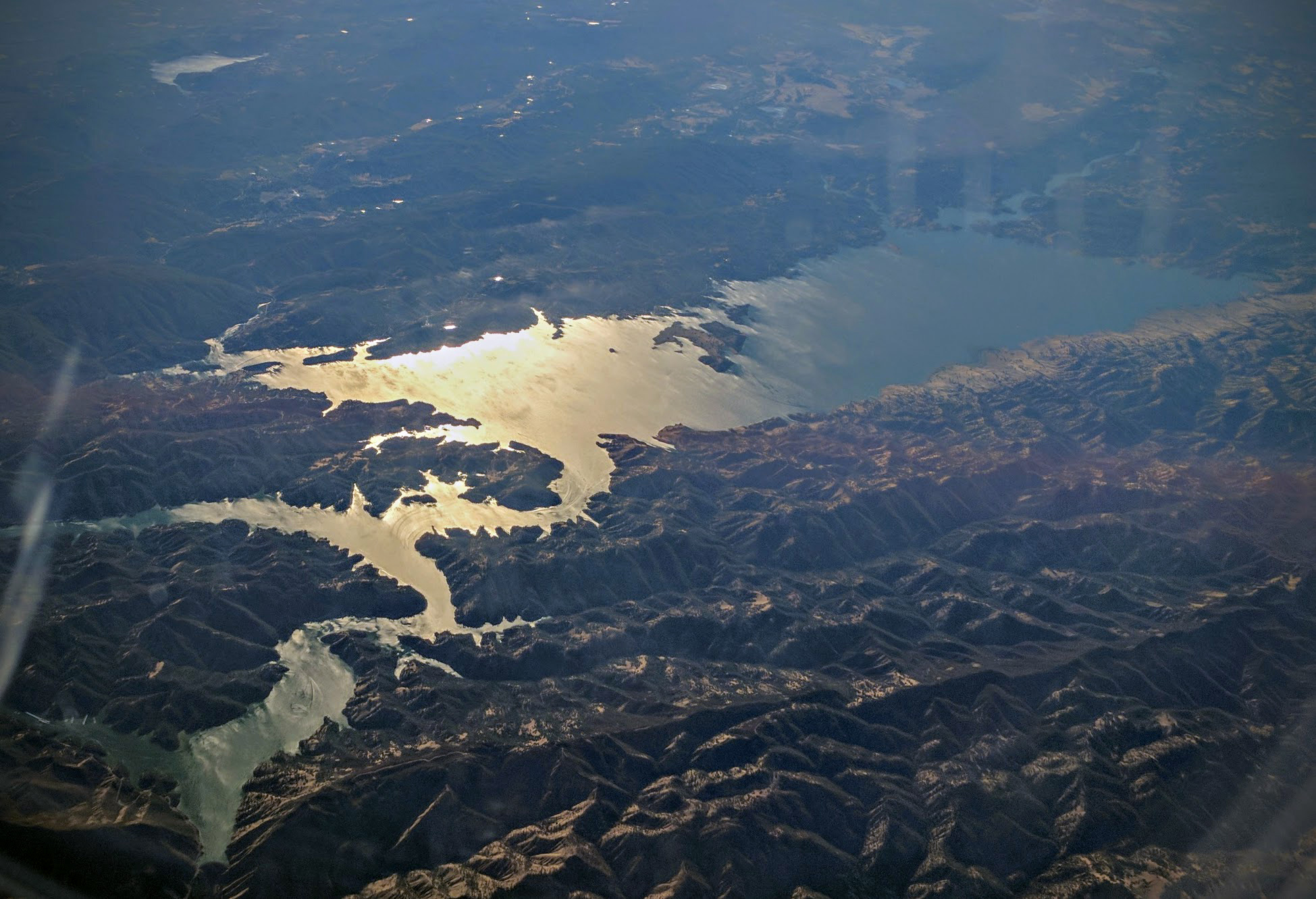
Aerial view of Lake Berryessa, looking west into the evening sun

Lake Berryessa is the largest lake in Napa County, California, United States. This reservoir in the Vaca Mountains was formed following the construction of the Monticello Dam on Putah Creek in the 1950s. Since the early 1960s, this reservoir has provided water and hydroelectricity to the North Bay region of the San Francisco Bay Area.

The reservoir was named after the Berryessa family of California; José Jesús and Sexto "Sisto" Berryessa were granted Rancho Las Putas in 1843.

== Geography ==
The lake is over 20,000 acres (8,100 ha) when full. It is approximately 16 mi (25 km) long and 3.1 mi (5 km) wide. It has approximately 165 mi (265 km) miles of shoreline.

Near the dam on the southeast side of the reservoir is an open bell-mouth spillway, 72 feet (22 m) in diameter, which is known as the Glory Hole. The pipe has a straight drop of 200 feet (61 m), and the diameter shrinks down to about 28 feet (8.5 m). The spillway has a maximum capacity of 48,000 cfs (1360 m^{3}/s). The spillway operates when there is excess water in the reservoir; in 2017 after heavy rains it started flowing, for the first time since 2006. It started flowing again in 2019 after heavy rains. In 1997 a woman was killed after being pulled inside the spillway.

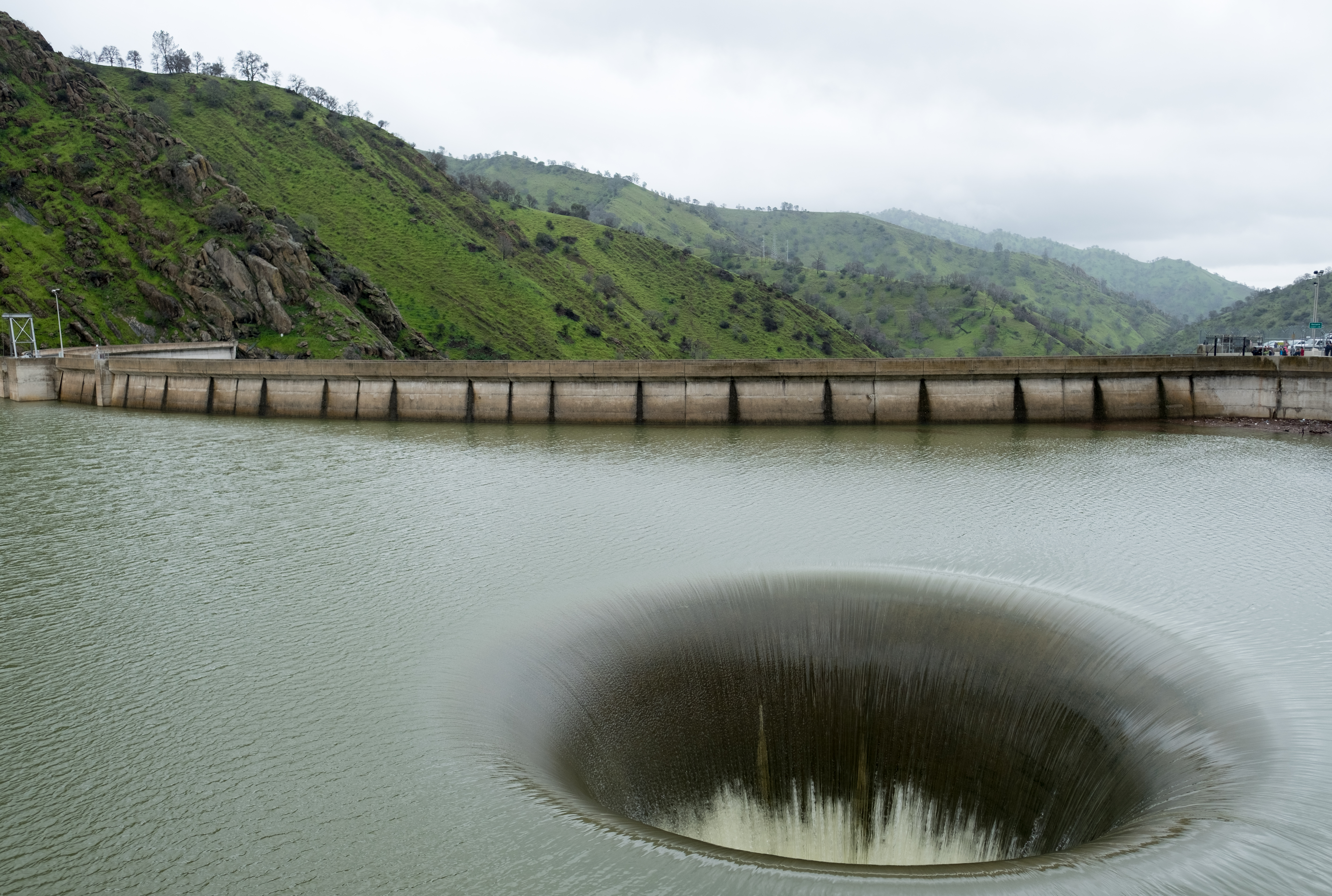
The spillway at Monticello Dam, Lake Berryessa, in operation, February 19, 2017

=== Geology ===
The active Green Valley Fault runs parallel to the Lake in the hills to the west.

=== Climate ===
The National Weather Service has maintained a cooperative weather station at the lake since November 1, 1957. Records show that the area has hot, mostly dry summers and cool, wet winters. Normal January temperatures are a maximum of 57.4 °F (14.1 °C) and a minimum of 36.4 °F (2.4 °C). Normal July temperatures are a maximum of 94.8 °F (34.9 °C) and a minimum of 56.8 °F (13.8 °C). There is an average of 90.7 days with highs of 90 °F (32 °C) or higher and an average of 24.1 days with lows of 32 °F (0 °C) or lower.

The record high temperature was 115 °F (46 °C) on July 24, 2006. The record low temperature was 13 °F (−11 °C) on December 22, 1990.

The wettest year was 1983 with 56.94 inches (1,446 mm) and the driest year was 1976 with 7.78 inches (198 mm). The most precipitation in one month was 21.33 inches (542 mm) in January 1995. The most precipitation in 24 hours was 5.29 inches (134 mm) on December 31, 2005. Snowfall is very rare, but 0.4 inches (10 mm) fell in January 1974.

Climate data for Lake Berryessa (Markley Cove), 1991–2020 normals, extremes 1970–present
Month	Jan	Feb	Mar	Apr	May	Jun	Jul	Aug	Sep	Oct	Nov	Dec	Year
Record high °F (°C)	80 (27)	83 (28)	89 (32)	96 (36)	104 (40)	110 (43)	115 (46)	111 (44)	114 (46)	104 (40)	89 (32)	76 (24)	115 (46)
Mean maximum °F (°C)	68.2 (20.1)	73.3 (22.9)	79.8 (26.6)	87.6 (30.9)	94.9 (34.9)	103.4 (39.7)	106.5 (41.4)	105.6 (40.9)	102.3 (39.1)	93.9 (34.4)	80.1 (26.7)	68.1 (20.1)	108.2 (42.3)
Mean daily maximum °F (°C)	57.4 (14.1)	61.4 (16.3)	66.0 (18.9)	71.3 (21.8)	79.3 (26.3)	88.0 (31.1)	94.8 (34.9)	94.1 (34.5)	90.1 (32.3)	79.4 (26.3)	66.1 (18.9)	57.5 (14.2)	75.5 (24.2)
Daily mean °F (°C)	46.9 (8.3)	49.6 (9.8)	53.1 (11.7)	57.1 (13.9)	63.9 (17.7)	71.0 (21.7)	75.8 (24.3)	75.0 (23.9)	71.7 (22.1)	63.4 (17.4)	53.3 (11.8)	46.9 (8.3)	60.6 (15.9)
Mean daily minimum °F (°C)	36.4 (2.4)	37.9 (3.3)	40.2 (4.6)	42.9 (6.1)	48.5 (9.2)	54.1 (12.3)	56.8 (13.8)	55.8 (13.2)	53.3 (11.8)	47.3 (8.5)	40.6 (4.8)	36.4 (2.4)	45.9 (7.7)
Mean minimum °F (°C)	28.3 (−2.1)	30.4 (−0.9)	32.8 (0.4)	35.5 (1.9)	41.3 (5.2)	46.7 (8.2)	50.0 (10.0)	50.2 (10.1)	47.7 (8.7)	40.0 (4.4)	32.3 (0.2)	28.2 (−2.1)	26.2 (−3.2)
Record low °F (°C)	20 (−7)	19 (−7)	26 (−3)	28 (−2)	31 (−1)	37 (3)	35 (2)	40 (4)	41 (5)	30 (−1)	24 (−4)	13 (−11)	13 (−11)
Average precipitation inches (mm)	5.72 (145)	5.93 (151)	4.10 (104)	1.67 (42)	1.01 (26)	0.23 (5.8)	0.01 (0.25)	0.03 (0.76)	0.07 (1.8)	1.09 (28)	2.49 (63)	5.60 (142)	27.95 (710)
Average precipitation days (≥ 0.01 in)	10.9	10.1	9.4	5.7	3.7	1.1	0.2	0.1	0.9	3.0	7.1	10.8	63.0
Source 1: NOAA
Source 2: National Weather Service

== History ==
The area is the traditional lands of the Pomo tribe. The valley was an agricultural region, the soil was considered among the finest in the country. The discovery of gold in the foothills of the Sierra Nevada brought an influx of people to the Central Valley. Communities in Solano County grew quickly in the gold rush. Monticello, a small farming town was founded by Ezra Peacock in 1867.

Interest in damming Putah Creek started around the early 1900s. In 1907, a few cities in the Bay Area were interested enough to hire three engineers, including Arthur Powell Davis and George Washington Goethals. Their interest quickly evaporated in favor of larger projects, but the place continued to attract interest. Small irrigation projects had developed in the surrounding areas but had little success. More water was needed to accommodate the rising population, so around the 1940s the Solano County Board of Supervisors organized the Solano County Water Council to search for the best place to develop a water project. The Solano Water Council agreed to focus on Monticello Dam. The original plan included alterations to both Putah Creek and Cache Creeks but complications led to a simpler plan which only dammed Putah Creek at Devil's Gate, which the Bureau of Reclamation assured engineers and planners was the most feasible spot to place a dam on Putah Creek.

Monticello residents opposed the Solano Project but were unsuccessful. The main town in the valley, Monticello, was abandoned in order to construct the reservoir. By the time of the evacuations for the dam it had a population of about 250 with some scattered on the outskirts in the valley. Putah Creek was the town's life source, it provided them with close access to water for both crop and livestock raising. Residents abandoned their homes, the Monticello cemetery had to be relocated, and houses were destroyed. Monticello ranchers were evicted as equipment was auctioned away and the fertile land was flooded. This abandonment was chronicled by the photographers Dorothea Lange and Pirkle Jones in their work Death of a Valley, published in Aperture magazine in 1960. Some predicted the dam would be unsuccessful and the valley would never fill. Construction of Monticello Dam began in 1953, completed in 1958, and the reservoir filled by 1963, creating what at the time was the second-largest reservoir in California after Shasta Lake. The Monticello Dam with Lake Berryessa, Putah Diversion Dam with Lake Solano, and associated water distribution systems and lands are known collectively as the Solano Project, which is distinct from other water projects in California such as the Central Valley Project.

A few years after the completion of the dam, Governor Edmund G. Brown proposed a new project to build an even bigger dam and a larger lake. The "Greater Berryessa Project" was envisioned to be a much larger project; the 304-foot dam would be replaced with a 600-foot dam that would be capable of holding ten times the amount of water, expanding the lake to three times the current size, flooding productive farmland. The project's primary purpose was storage of northern water for use in parts of southern California.

== Hydrology ==
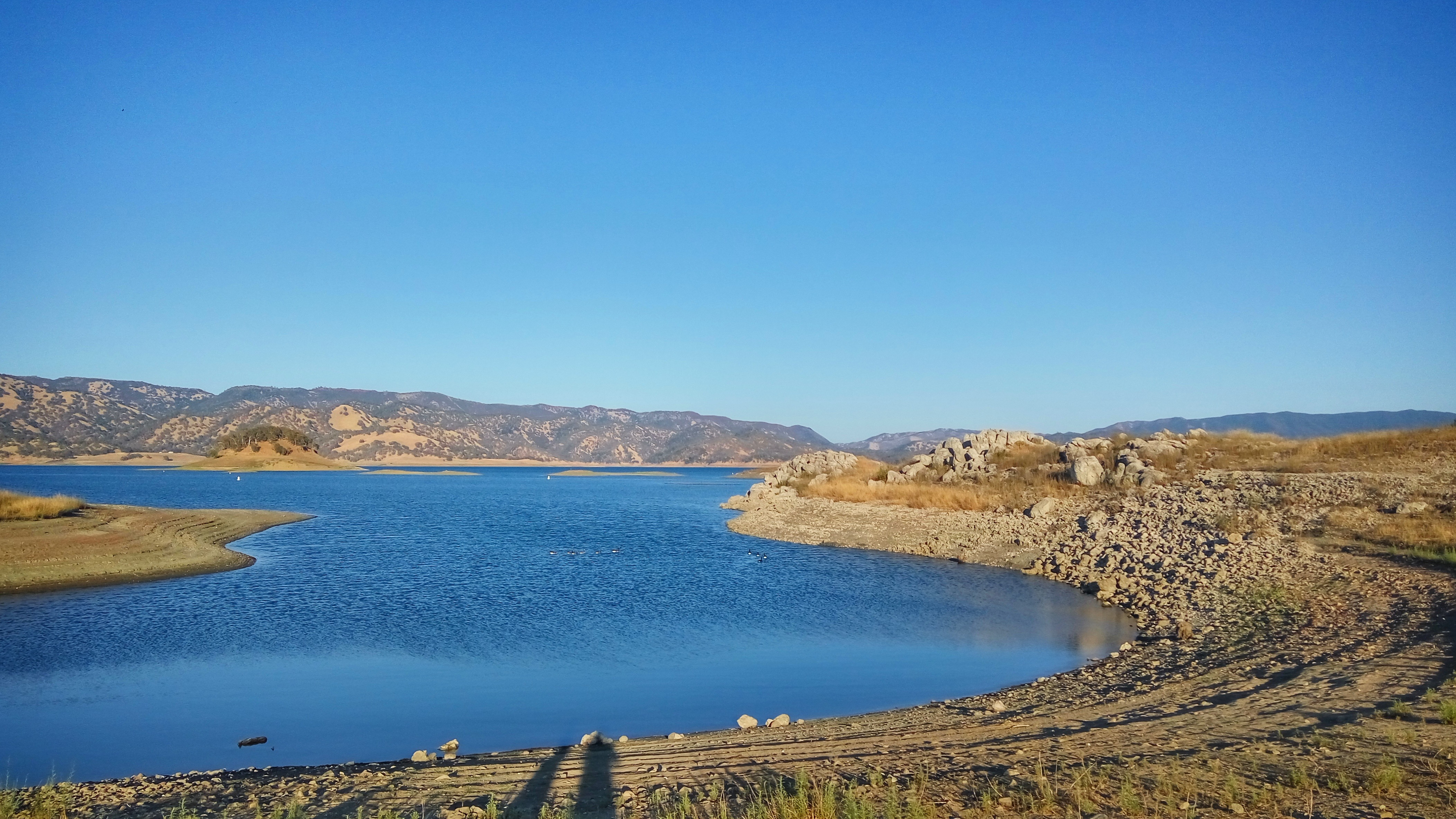
A view of Lake Berryessa

The lake is fed by the headwaters to the 576-square-mile (1,490 km^{2}) Putah Creek watershed. It has a storage capacity of 1,602,000 acre-feet (1.976×10^{9} m^{3}), making it one of the larger reservoirs in California. Besides Putah Creek there are three other major tributaries that contribute to the lake: Capell Creek, Pope Creek, and Eticuera Creek. Since all of these creeks do not come from the same area, the lake level rise is hard to predict. Each creek has a different flow rate and that rate is based on the precipitation level where the creek comes from. These smaller tributaries mostly contribute in the winter or wet season only and usually dry out in the summer months. Though Putah Creek is not the only creek that is directly impacted by the project, it is the only creek that is dammed.

The Solano Projects are much more than just Monticello Dam and Lake Berryessa, including Putah Diversion Dam, Lake Solano, and the Putah South Canal. Lake Berryessa is the largest body of water formed from the Solano Projects and so is the most well-known. Lake Berryessa does help to manage flooding in Yolo county. It is estimated that for the first forty years, over five million dollars were saved from avoided flood damage. A study in 1986 shows that it is highly unlikely that Lake Berryessa will overflow. There are a few times that the water level has actually gone over 440 feet (130 m), as it did on February 17, 2017. In the study, the probability of the lake level reaching 450 feet (140 m). was estimated at one percent; likely only to happen once in a hundred years. The highest water level ever recorded at Lake Berryessa was 446.7 feet (136.2 m). Raising Monticello dam is highly unlikely but one possible way to increase water storage at the lake is to raise the height of the Glory Hole.

Lake Berryessa supplies water to Vacaville, Suisun City, Vallejo and Fairfield, as well as Travis Air Force Base located south of Lake Berryessa. The Solano County Water Agency (SCWA) and its partners work closely to manage the water levels at Lake Berryessa. A "Drought Contingency Plan" is in place to manage lake level if it drops below 800,000 acre-feet (990,000,000 m^{3}) then SCWA and acting partners will work to find alternate water supplies for the lake's recipients and try to conserve the lake's water for as long as possible.

Though the lake and Monticello Dam are in Napa County, the water yield of up to about 245,000 acre-feet per year from the Solano Project is largely contracted to Solano County Water Agency and managed under subcontract by Solano Irrigation District for use in Solano County. The water is used for agricultural, municipal, and industrial purposes under a contract for use of water rights held by the federal Bureau of Reclamation. Another contract allows for use of up to 1,500 acre-feet of water per year around Lake Berryessa in Napa County. The 25-year contracts were renewed in 2009. The Monticello Dam Powerplant built in 1983 generates up to 12 MW of hydroelectric power. A settlement of water right claims to Putah Creek was made in 2000. Known as the Putah Creek Accord, it allowed for scheduled instream flows in lower Putah Creek flowing to the Yolo Bypass. Water rights for the watershed above Monticello Dam were amended in 1996.

Lake Berryessa is a monomictic lake, which means that the waters of the lake turnover once a year. For monomictic lakes that turnover time is somewhere in the Fall. Lake turnover happens when the warmer surface water starts to cool to match the lower cooler water. Once the lake is all the same temperature, water can freely circulate all around and oxygen replenishes parts of the water where it has been diminished. Fishing during the turnover time or after can be difficult because the monotone temperature and oxygen level of the lake allows for the fish to go anywhere in the lake.

Lake Berryessa is critical for recharging the groundwater in the surrounding areas. Without the dam, Putah Creek can dry out in summer.

== Management ==
The creation of Monticello Dam and Lake Berryessa were not intended for public and recreational use. The lake was initially fenced off but interest from the public increased and many people still managed to access the water in the first two years. With no federal or state agencies wanting to manage affairs at the lake, agencies authorized seven concessionaires to provide recreational activities at the lake to the public on federal land in the late 1950s. Those 50 year contracts for the concessionaires came to an end in 2009. During the time of the concessionaires, they leased some land to RV homes for long term housing. When the contracts ended, all the recreational facilities and mobile homes were forced to move from federal property. The new reclamation has yet to seriously start any new development on recreational activities at the lake though a new multi-purpose trail is to be in the future. Post-contract, recreation levels and activities at Lake Berryessa have perished from the concessionaire days. Estimates from the bureau estimated that visitations at Lake Berryessa dropped to less than half since the termination of all seven resorts. The Bureau of Reclamation held an open bid period in 2015 to businesses for developmental opportunities at Lake Berryessa. As of early 2016 there were no successful bids for any of the concession areas at Lake Berryessa.

The Zebra and Quagga mussel infestation at Lake Berryessa is managed by the SCWA and its interns. The program, which has been operating for over 15 years, is intended to educate boaters about invasive mussels. Any boat that has been in waters known to have either mussel must wait thirty days from the day of inspection before re-entering the water. Unfortunately, insufficient funds and resources make it difficult to inspect boats year-round. The program only operates seasonally.

In 2007, the SCWA conducted a study of the lake bed to determine if the lake has lost any of its capacity due to sedimentation as well as map the lake bed as accurately as possible with new technology. The study found that Lake Berryessa has not lost storage capacity.

== Recreation ==
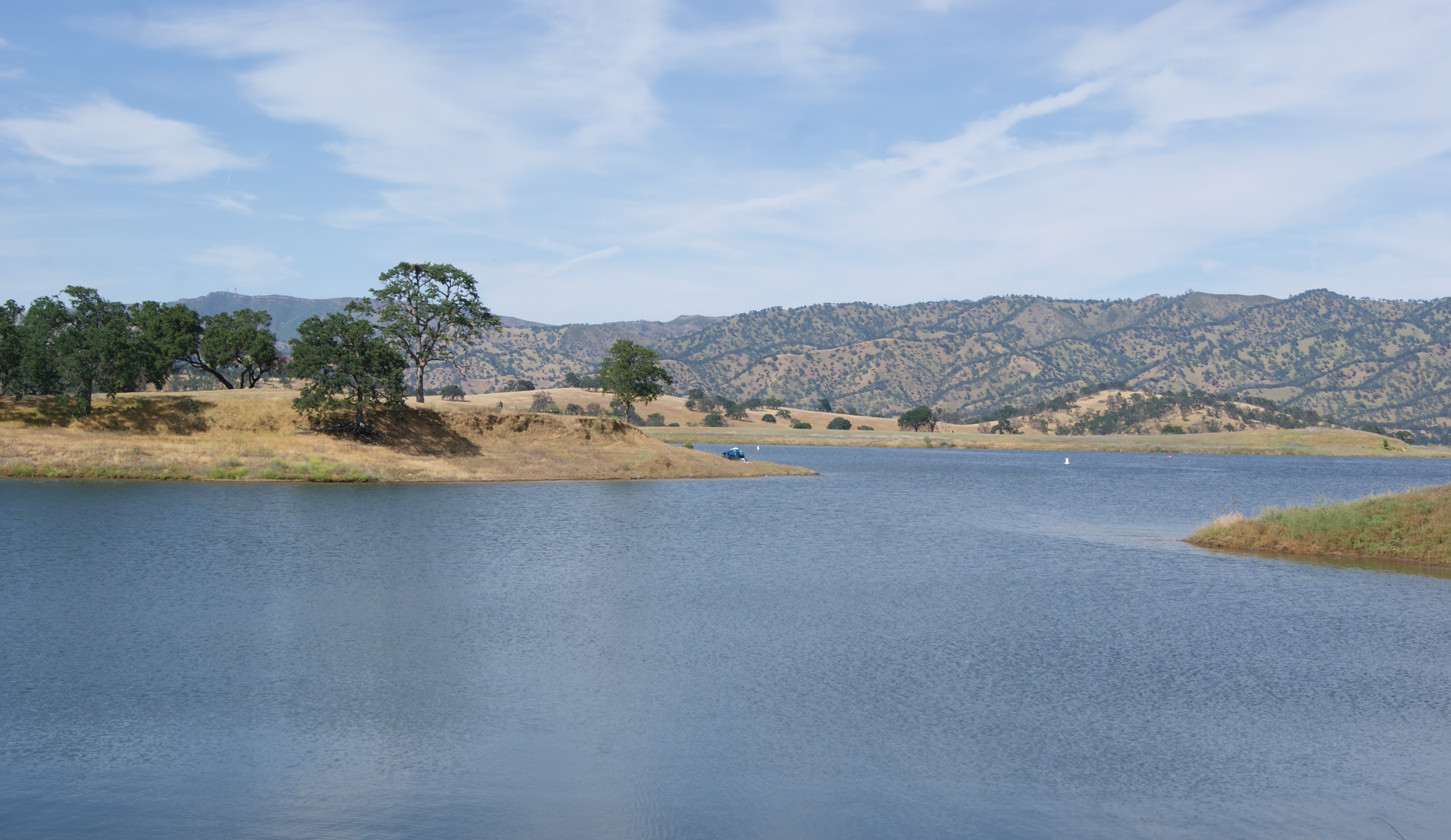
Lake Berryessa, California, looking northeast from Oak Shore

Popular activities include fishing, waterskiing, jet skiing, pleasure boating, kayaking and canoeing, hiking, road bicycling, motorcycle pleasure biking, birding, wildlife observation, picnicking, and swimming. The Lake Berryessa Seaplane Base is located on the lake's surface, and an estimated 200 seaplane operations were reported between September 2011 and September 2012. It is used for seaplane landings and splash-ins.

Lake Berryessa is a swimming and water skiing site for enthusiasts. The narrow portion of the reservoir, nearest to the Monticello Dam, is referred to as the "Narrows," and is sometimes busy with boaters on holidays and weekends.

There are several resorts with marinas at the lake, as well as nearby Lake Solano County Park located west of Winters, California. Day use areas include Oak Shores and Smittle Creek. There are swimming areas closed to boats and other watercraft, as well as several hiking trails.

Lakeshore lands, facilities, and concessions in Napa County are managed by the Bureau of Reclamation. However, five of the seven resort concessions that expired in 2009 have not yet become fully operational. Based on rules against exclusive occupancy of federal recreation lands, about 1,300 long-term resident trailers were removed from the resorts when the 50-year concession contracts expired. In the following years, public usage of the lake dwindled due to government delays in formulating a future plan.

There is a seaplane landing area that is open to the public. One of the larger islands contained a small plane landing area but it was closed in the early 1970s in response to a safety report issued by the Federal Aviation Administration (FAA).

=== Fishing ===
Fishing at Lake Berryessa can be successful year-round as the lake is home to both warm-water and cold-water fish species. Lake Berryessa offers a variety of fish from sunfish to landlocked salmon. Because fish species are plentiful, fishing can be done in a variety of ways; from finesse techniques, bait fishing, and to trolling in the deep. Fish species at Lake Berryessa include; largemouth bass (Micropterus salmoides), smallmouth bass (Micropterus dolomeiu), spotted bass, channel catfish (Ictalurus punctatus), bullhead catfish (Ictalurus dolomeiu), white catfish (Ameiurus catus), carp (Cyprinus carpio), Sacramento pikeminnow (Ptychocheilus grandis), crappie, bluegill (Lepomis macrochirus), rainbow trout (Onchorhynchus mykiss), brown and brook trout, Kokanee, and also Chinook salmon (Onchorhynchus tschawytscha). The rainbow trout species is native to the region while many other species were introduced. Largemouth bass and smallmouth bass were both introduced into the lake in the late 1950s and spotted bass followed in the 1980s. Bass and salmon are mostly noted as sport fishing species, bluegill, black and white crappie, and catfish are more of a recreational and beginners type of fish and carp and pikeminnow are usually not favored among anglers. The introduced species of carp is also present and feeds on organic matter, water snails, bloodworm, fresh water mussels as well as their own eggs.

Besides the Sacramento pikeminnow, Lake Berryessa also has the golden shiner and threadfin shad which are usually baitfish to the other species of fish. Aside from the fish Lake Berryessa also supports other aquatic organisms such as crawfish, clams, and otters. The California Office of Environmental Health Hazard Assessment (OEHHA) has issued a safe eating advisory for any fish caught in Lake Berryessa due to elevated levels of mercury. A copy of these guidelines can also be found at Lake Berryessa's Visitor Center. Mercury levels at Lake Berryessa are on the rise and there are no fish that OEHHA recommend to eat more than three times a week. In context of mercury, trouts are the best option for Berryessa at this time. Fishing regulations accord with standard California Department of Fish and Wildlife regulations. There are tournaments scheduled throughout nine of the twelve months out of the year for bass.

=== Hunting ===
Hunting on Lake Berryessa is not permitted in lands that are managed by the Bureau of Reclamation. Firearms are allowed on these lands under specific criteria; possession of a Carry Conceal Weapon (CCW) certificate or, if the firearm is disassembled, disarmed and you have a valid California Hunting License and a Permit to Transport Firearm. The Permit to Transport Firearm does not allow for possession of firearm while recreating in Bureau of Recreation lands. Hunting can be possible on lands managed by other agencies next to Reclamation lands such as Knoxville Wildlife Area, Knoxville Recreation, and Cedar Roughs Wildlife area. These areas are under the jurisdiction of California Department of Fish and Wildlife and/or the Bureau of Land Management. Human beings are also present in these areas and the perimeter is fairly small so caution and safety should always be the main priority.

=== Cedar Roughs Wilderness ===
Adjoining the Lake Berryessa Recreational Area is the Cedar Roughs Wilderness Area. The Northern California Coastal Wild Heritage Wilderness Act of 2006 set aside the former study area of 6,350 acres (25.7 km^{2}) located 1.8 miles (2.9 km) past Pope Creek bridge on the Pope Creek arm of Lake Berryessa. The wilderness area can be accessed by car or boat, although there are no maintained trails. Hiking can be difficult as more than half of the wilderness area consists of Sargent's cypress, which covers 3,000 acres (12 km^{2}) and is relatively pure genetically. It is the second most widely distributed cypress in California, and was named for Charles Sprague Sargent (1841–1927), the founder and director of Harvard University's Arnold Arboretum and author of the 14-volume Silva of North America. The area is jointly managed by the Bureau of Land Management and California Department of Fish and Game.

== Flora and fauna ==
Notable plants in the area include sergeant cypress, white alder, leather oak, Jepson's navarretia, and Bridge's brodiaea.

The east side of the lake has a 2,000-acre (8.1 km^{2}) Wildlife Management Area managed by the California Department of Fish and Game that protects wildlife habitats for such species as mountain lion, black-tailed deer, western rattlesnake, raccoon, skunk, osprey, turkey, rabbit and golden eagle.

== 1969 murder ==
In 1969, the lake became the site of one of the Zodiac murders. On the evening of September 27, Pacific Union College students Bryan Hartnell and Cecelia Shepard were picnicking at Lake Berryessa on a small island connected by a sand spit to Twin Oak Ridge. A man approached them wearing a black executioner's-type hood with clip-on sunglasses over the eye-holes and a bib-like device on his chest that had a white 3 by 3 inches (76 by 76 mm) cross-circle symbol on it. He approached them with a gun, which Hartnell believed to be a .45. The hooded man claimed to be an escaped convict from Deer Lodge, Montana, where he had killed a guard and stolen a car, explaining that he needed their car and money to go to Mexico. He had brought precut lengths of plastic clothesline and told Shepard to tie up Hartnell, before he tied her up. The killer checked and tightened Hartnell's bonds, after discovering Shepard had bound Hartnell's hands loosely. Hartnell initially believed it to be a weird robbery, but the man drew a knife and stabbed them both repeatedly. The killer then hiked 500 yards (460 m) back up to Knoxville Road, drew a cross-circle symbol on Hartnell's car door with a black felt-tip pen, and wrote beneath it: "Vallejo/12-20-68/7-4-69/Sept 27–69–6:30/by knife", the location and dates of the killer's first two crimes, and the date and time of the crime he had just committed.

At 7:40 p.m. (19:40), the killer called the Napa County Sheriff's office from a pay telephone to report this latest crime. The phone was found, still off the hook, minutes later at the Napa Car Wash on Main Street in Napa, only a few blocks from the sheriff's office, yet 27 miles (43 km) from the crime scene. Detectives were able to lift a still-wet palm print from the telephone but were never able to match it to any suspect.

After hearing their screams for help, a man and his son who were fishing in a nearby cove discovered the victims and summoned help by contacting park rangers. Cecelia Shepard was conscious when law enforcement officers from the Napa County Sheriff's office arrived, but lapsed into a coma during transport to the hospital and never regained consciousness. She died two days later, but Hartnell survived to recount his tale to the press. Napa County Sheriff Detective Ken Narlow, who was assigned to the case from the outset, worked on solving the crime until his retirement from the department in 1987.

== See also ==
- Berryessa Snow Mountain National Monument
- List of dams and reservoirs in California
- List of lakes in California
- List of lakes in the San Francisco Bay Area
- List of largest reservoirs in the United States
- List of largest reservoirs of California
- Wragg Fire
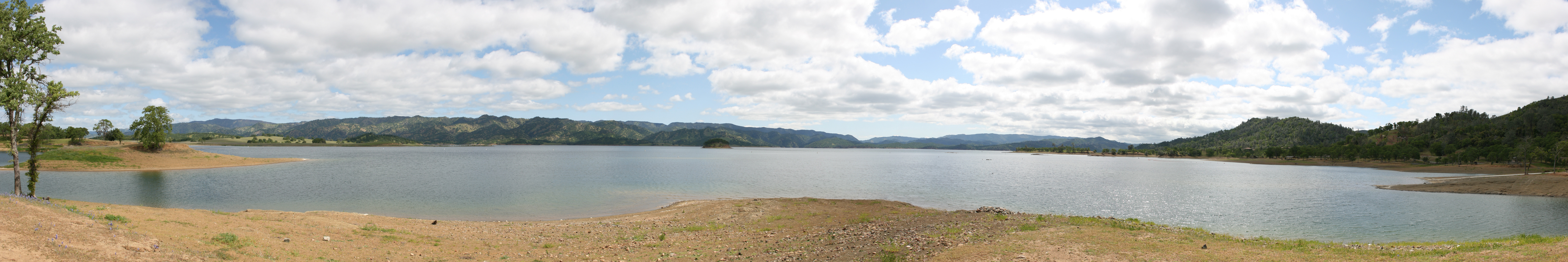
A panorama of Lake Berryessa
