= Putah Creek =

River in California

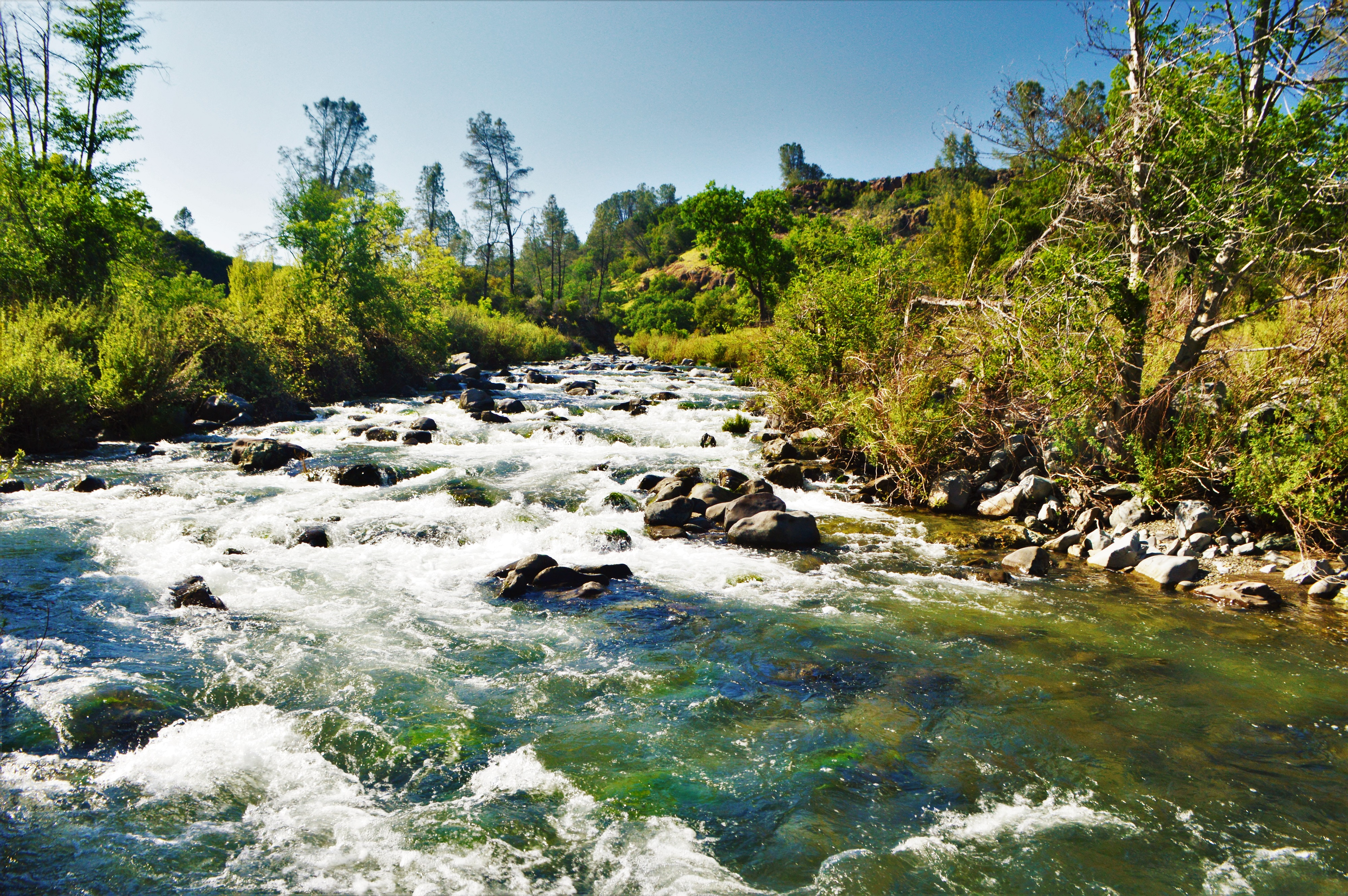
- Putah Creek above Monticello Dam

- Location of the mouth of Putah Creek in California
- Native name: Liwaito (Patwin)

Location
- Country: United States
- State: California
- Counties: Yolo, Solano, Napa, Lake

Physical characteristics
- Source: Cobb Mountain
  - coordinates: 38°48′26″N 122°43′21″W
  - elevation: 3,651 ft (1,113 m)
- Mouth: Yolo Bypass
  - location: Prospect Slough in Yolo Bypass
  - coordinates: 38°30′56″N 121°35′20″W
  - elevation: 7.5 ft (2.3 m)
- Length: 85 mi (137 km)
- Basin size: 638 sq mi (1,650 km^{2})
- Discharge
  - location: near Winters, CA
  - average: 477 cu ft/s (13.5 m^{3}/s)
  - minimum: 0 cu ft/s (0 m^{3}/s)
  - maximum: 81,000 cu ft/s (2,300 m^{3}/s)

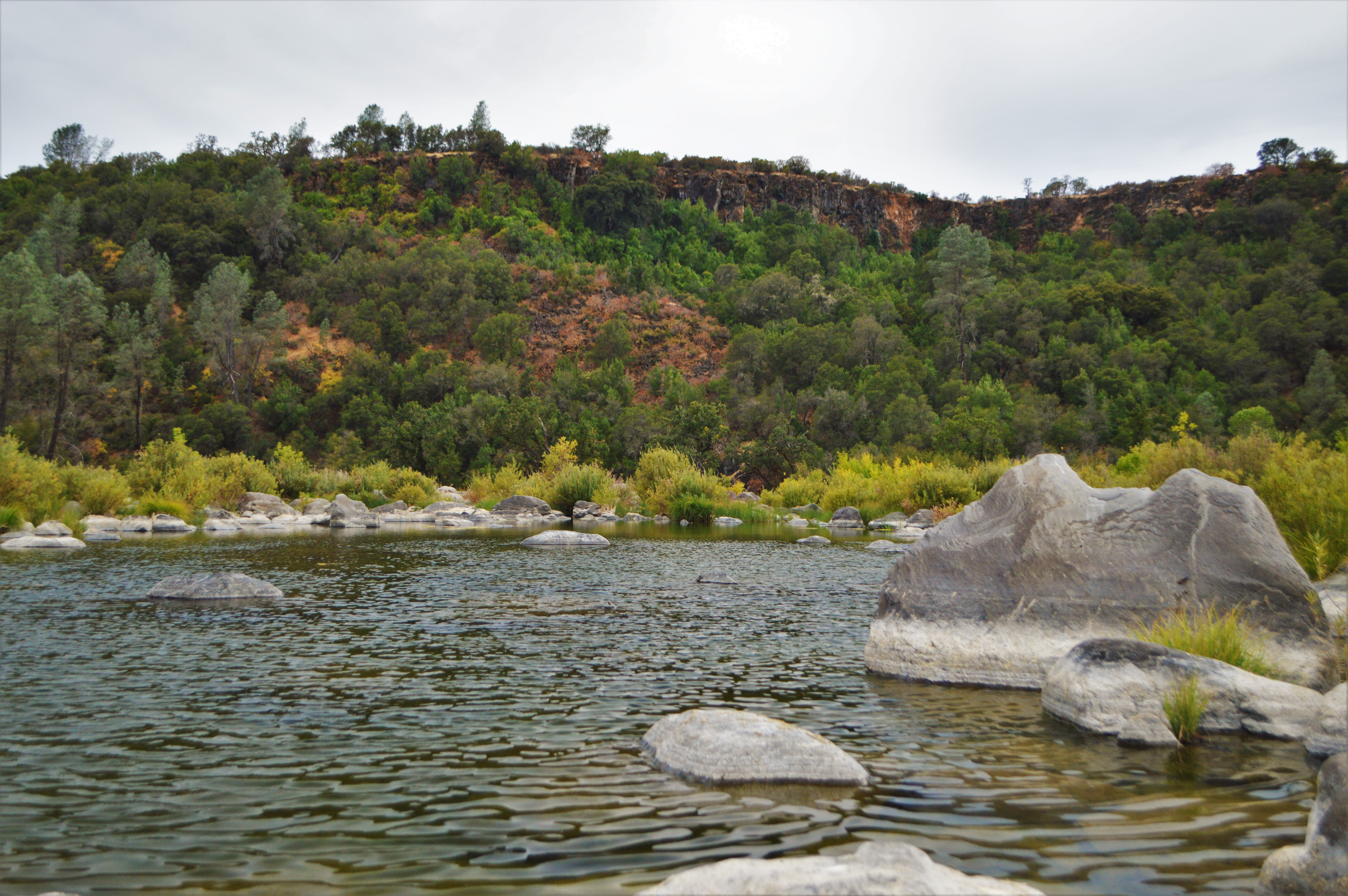
Putah Creek's natural flow above Lake Berryessa in the Mayacamas Mountains during September 2017

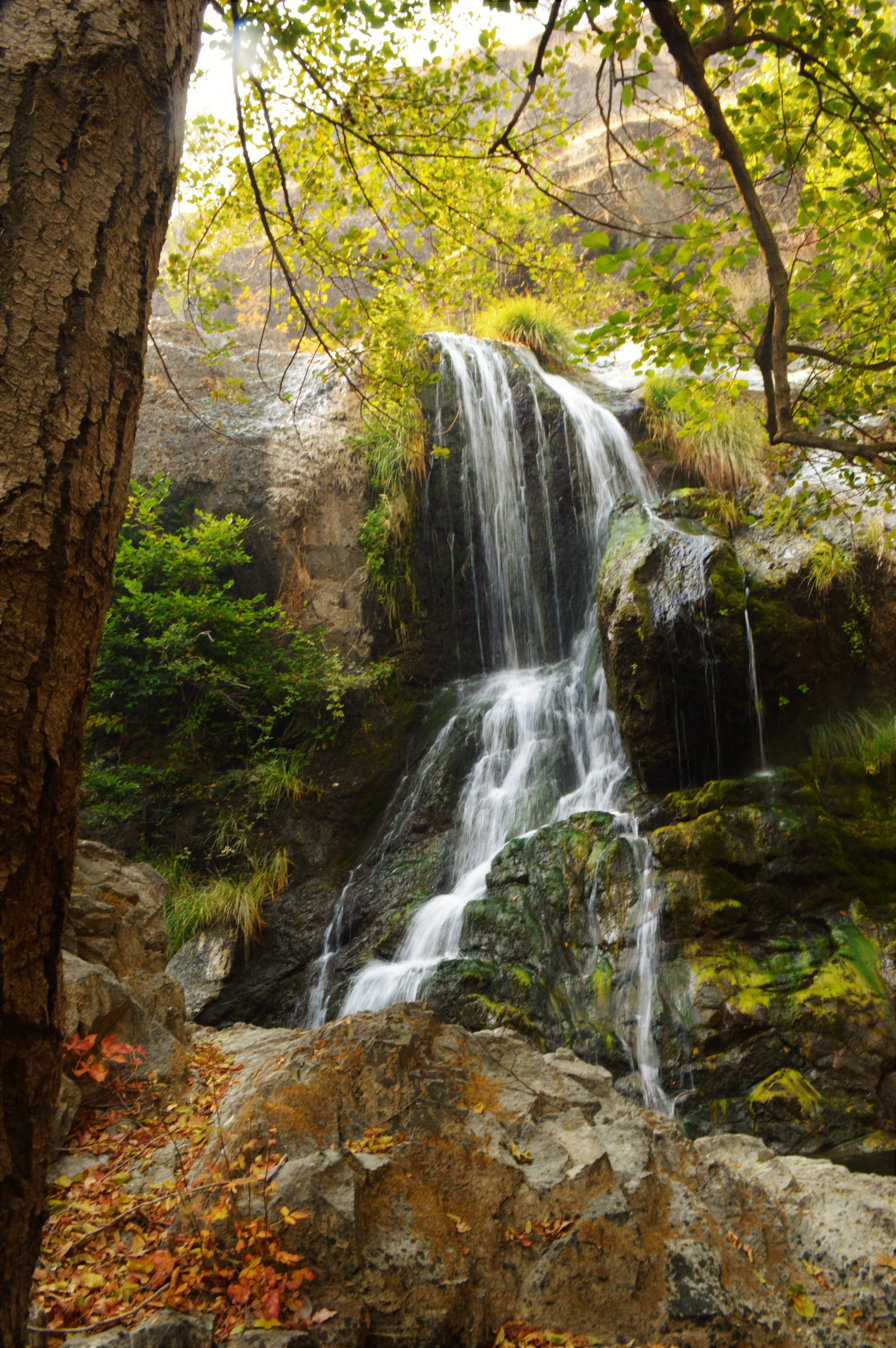
The source of Putah Creek on Cobb Mountain

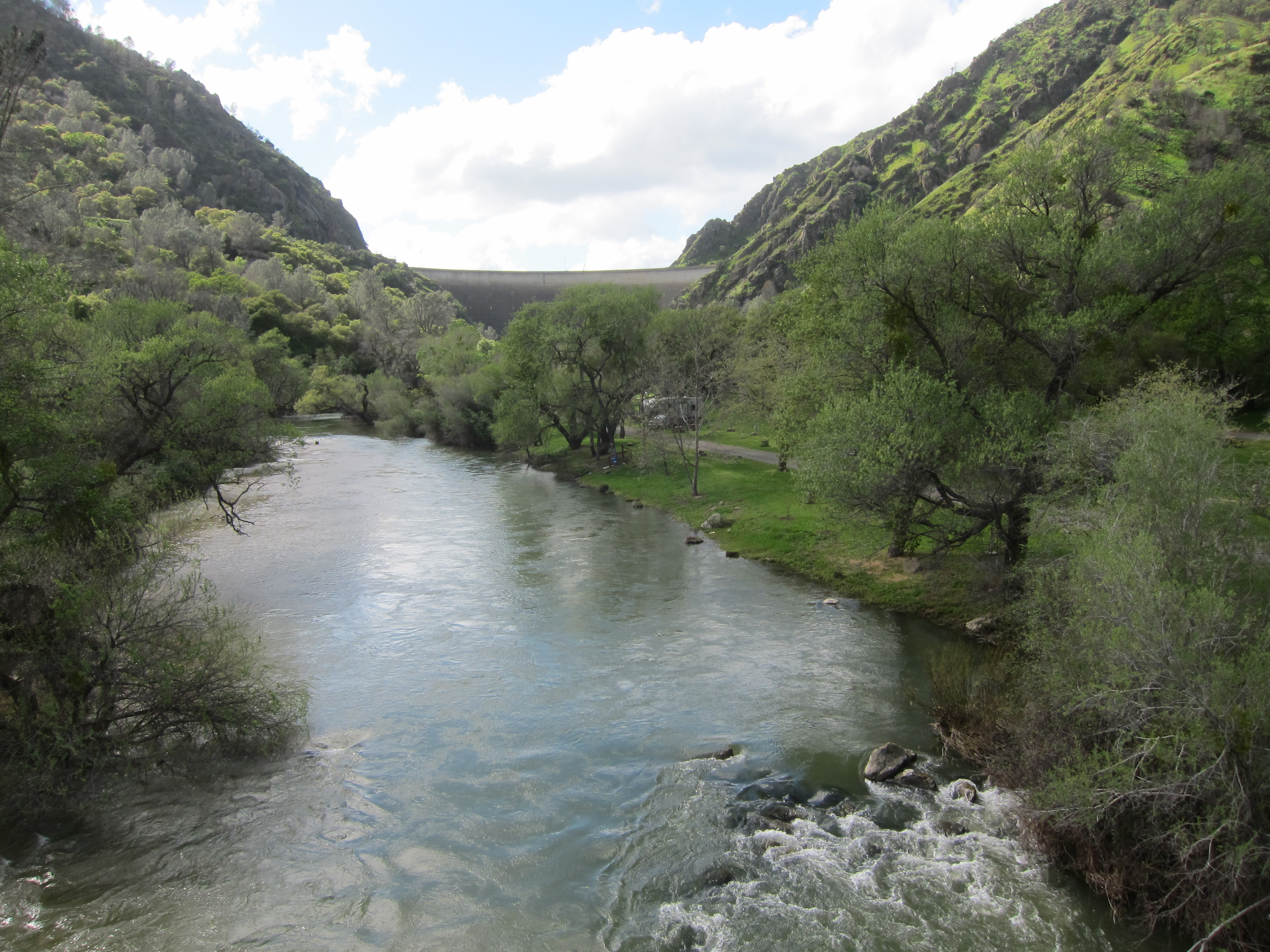
A view of Putah Creek from Highway 128 bridge, below Monticello Dam

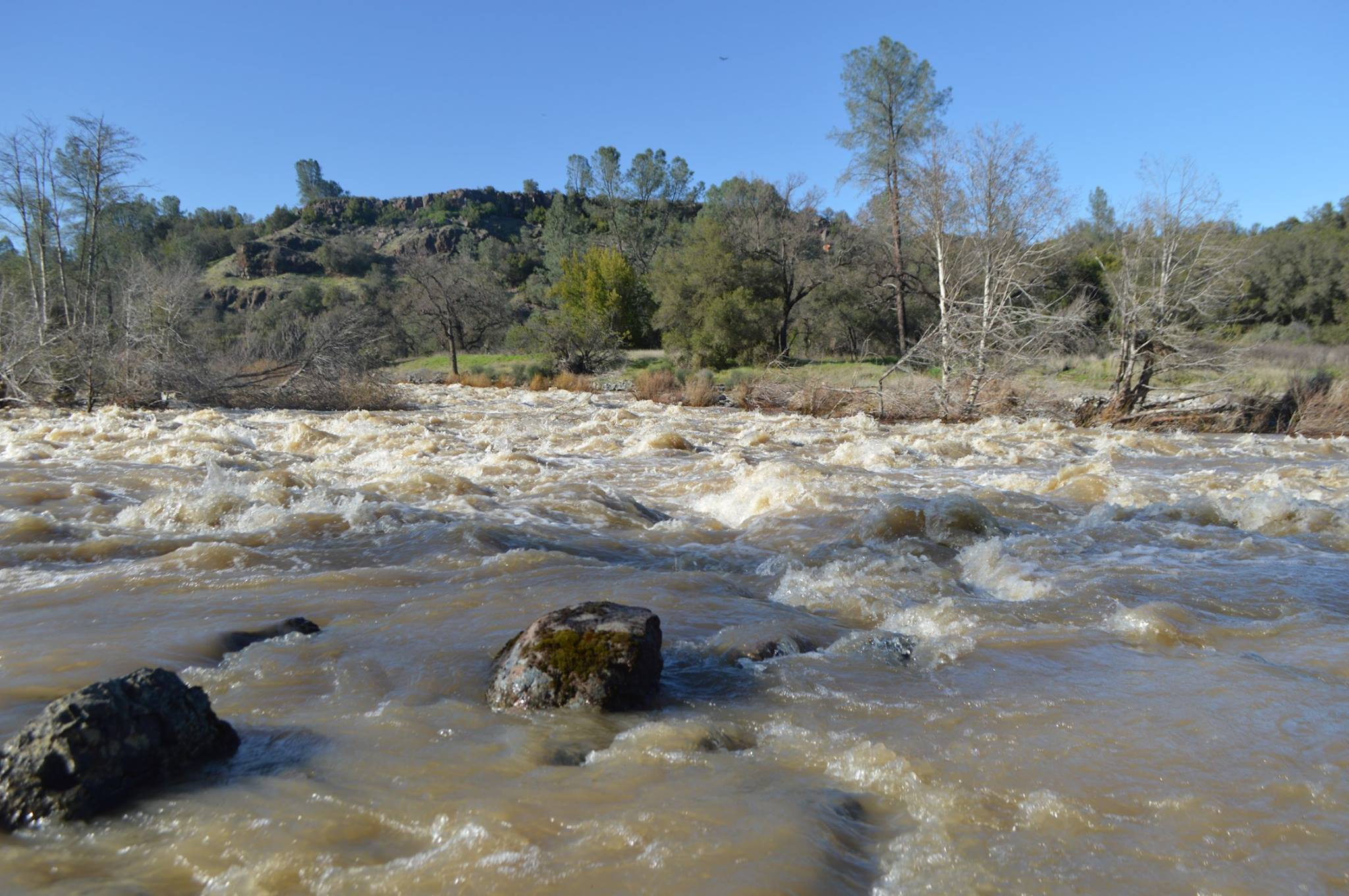
High Flows along Putah Creek in March 2018. The flows in this picture are approximately 5000 cfs above Lake Berryessa.

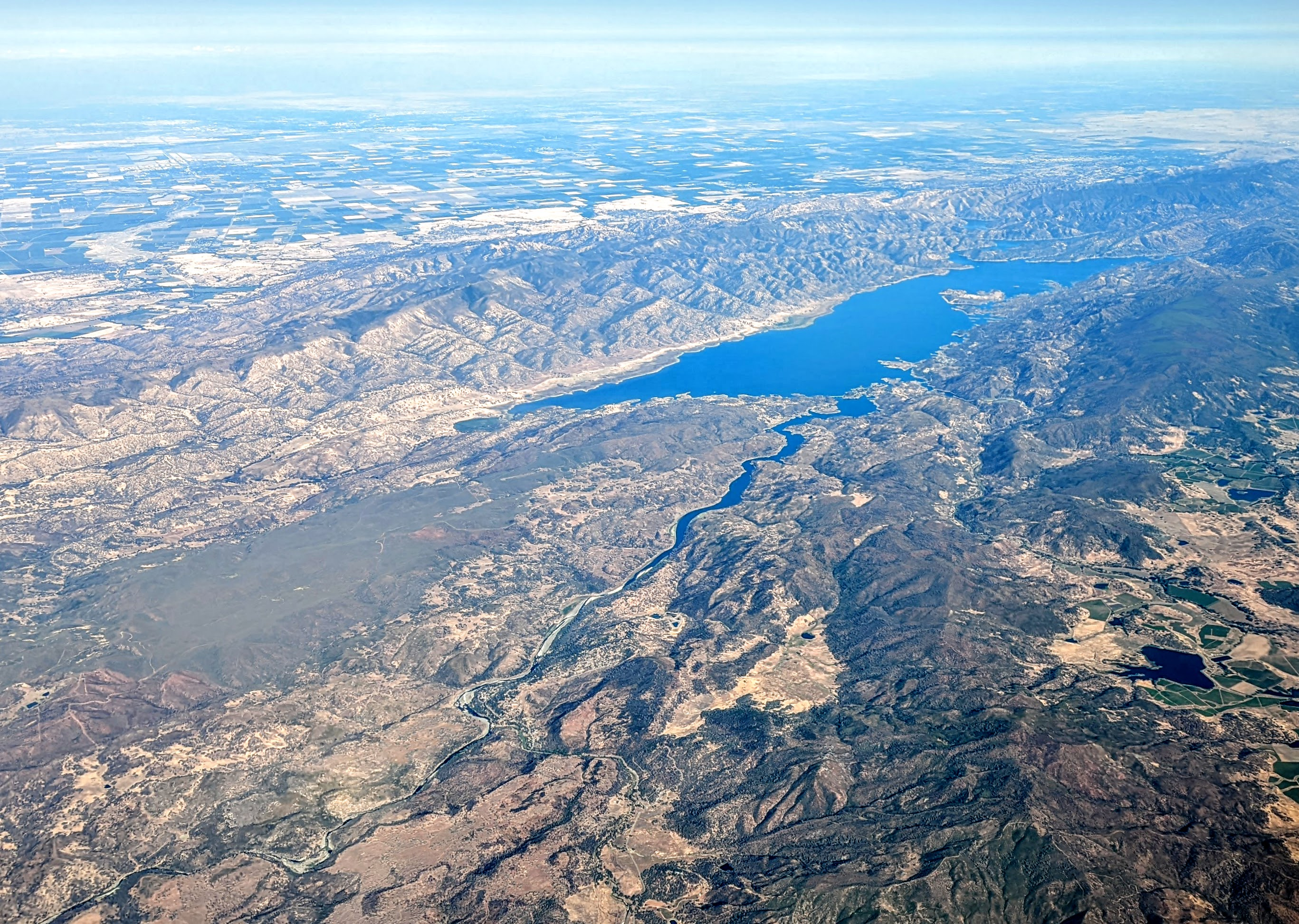
Aerial view of Putah Creek flowing into Lake Berryessa

Putah Creek (Patwin: Liwaito) is a major stream in Northern California, a tributary of the Yolo Bypass, and ultimately, the Sacramento River. The 85-mile-long (137 km) creek has its headwaters in the Mayacamas Mountains, a part of the Coast Range, and flows east through two dams. First, Monticello Dam forms Lake Berryessa, below which Putah Creek forms the border of Yolo and Solano Counties, and then flows to the Putah Diversion Dam and Lake Solano. After several drought years in the late 1980s, the majority of Putah Creek went dry, prompting a landmark lawsuit that resulted in the signing of the Putah Creek Accord in 2000. The Accord established releases from the dams to maintain stream flows in Putah Creek, with natural flow regimes which spike in winter/spring and ebb in summer/fall. The restoration of natural flow regimes has resulted in a doubling of riparian bird species and a return of spawning native steelhead trout and Chinook salmon, as well as protecting the livelihood of farmers on the lower watershed.

== History and name ==
The true meaning of "Putah" in Putah Creek has been the subject of discussion and speculation. It was originally called "Arroyo de los Putos" (1844) and "Puta Creek" (1845), but the "Puta" form was rejected by the United States Board on Geographic Names, likely because of the resemblance to the Spanish word puta (lit. "whore"). According to Erwin Gudde (1889–1969), the resemblance is "purely accidental". The revised fourth edition of Gudde's California Place Names has the following entry:

Putah Creek [Lake, Napa, Solano Cos.]. From Lake Miwok puṭa wuwwe "grassy creek" (Callaghan; cf. Beeler 1974:141). The similarity to Spanish puta "prostitute" is purely accidental. In the records of Mission San Francisco Solano (Sonoma Mission) of 1824, the natives of the place are mentioned with various spellings from Putto to Puttato. In the baptismal records of Mission Dolores an adulto de Putü is mentioned in 1817, and the wife of Pedro Putay in 1821 (Arch. Mis. 1:94.81). In 1842 the stream was well known by its name: "I know that the Rio was called 'Putos.'...It is well-known by the name which has been given it" (J. J. Warner, land-grant case 232 ND). The name was probably fixed by William Wolfskill, who named his grant Rio de los Putos on May 24, 1842. In 1843 the name was used in the titles of three other land grants, in one of which the spelling Putas occurs. In the Statutes of the early 1850s, in the Indian Reports, and in the Pac. R.R. Reports, the spelling of the name is in complete confusion. The present version was applied to a town in 1853, was used in the Statutes of 1854, was made popular by the Bancroft maps, and finally was adopted by the USGS.

According to a map created by Eugène Duflot de Mofras, a French naturalist and explorer, and published in Paris in 1844, Putah Creek was once known as Young's River, named for the fur trapper Ewing Young, who hunted beaver on an expedition up Putah Creek to Clear Lake and on to the Mendocino County Coast in March, 1833.

The lower reaches of the creek were sometimes called Walnut Bayou, in reference to the warm and sluggish water and the abundance of California Black Walnut trees on the banks.

== Watershed and course ==
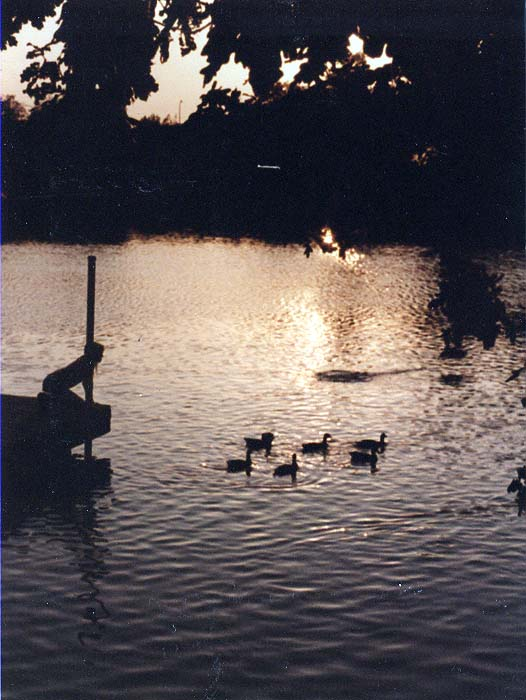
Putah Creek, UC Davis Arboretum

The creek originates from springs on the east side of Cobb Mountain south of the town of Cobb in southwestern Lake County and flows approximately 130 kilometers (81 mi) to Lake Berryessa. It descends eastward to the town of Whispering Pines, where it turns southeast, parallelling State Route 175. It passes the town of Anderson Springs, where it joins Bear Canyon Creek. North of Middletown, it curves counterclockwise around Harbin Mountain, merging in close succession with Dry Creek, Helena Creek, Crazy Creek, Harbin Creek, and Big Canyon Creek. From Harbin Mountain, it flows east again, joining Bucksnort Creek, then enters Napa County at a confluence with Hunting Creek about 11 mi (18 km) east of Middletown. In Napa County, the creek flows southeast, merging with Butts Creek just before it empties into Lake Berryessa, and the Monticello Dam.

Downstream of Monticello Dam, on the southeastern corner of the lake, Putah Creek leaves Napa County and becomes the boundary between Yolo County and Solano County flowing about 13 kilometers (8.1 mi) to the Putah Diversion Dam (PDD), where most of water flows are diverted south through the Putah South Canal to users in Solano County. In this section the creek offers excellent fishing opportunities year round. California Department of Fish and Wildlife regulations require "catch and release" in this section of the stream, as well as the use of artificial lures with barbless hooks. The California Office of Environmental Health Hazard Assessment (OEHHA) has developed a safe eating advisory for fish caught in Putah Creek based on levels of mercury or PCBs found in local species. Stormwater runoff from a nearby Superfund site formally known as the Laboratory for Energy-Related Health Research (LEHR), has shown elevated levels of Mercury reaching 500 ng/L entering Putah Creek. While the site has been decommissioned since the late 1980s and federally listed as a National Priority Superfund site by the EPA in 1994, the amount of contamination to the soil, groundwater aquifer, and nearby Putah Creek, continue to be a hazard to the area. This concentration of mercury in Putah creek creates health risks for anything that may eat the fish, as the bioaccumulation of mercury found in the fish passes along the food web to birds and potentially humans. The stream continues east along State Route 128, receiving Pleasants Creek before arriving at Lake Solano where the Putah Diversion Dam diverts flows to the Putah South Canal, carrying water to the residents of Vallejo.

Below Lake Solano, Putah Creek flows 37 kilometers (23 mi) before reaching the Yolo Bypass and by that artificial route, to the Sacramento River. In this section, Putah Creek first receives McCune Creek, then its last tributary, Dry Creek. After the Dry Creek confluence it passes through the town of Winters to reach Interstate 505. From there Putah Creek channel continues eastward, parallelling Putah Creek Road to Stevenson Bridge Road. Putah Creek used to flow near downtown Davis in what is now the UC Davis Arboretum channel, but early settlers redirected the creek south of Davis in 1871, and in the late 1940s the Army Corps of Engineers added levees to what is now the South Fork Putah Creek. A few miles east of Davis, the county line turns south, but the South Fork Putah Creek continues eastward, passing south of Davis to feed into the Yolo Bypass about a quarter mile (400 m) west of the Sacramento Deep Water Channel.

== Dams and diversions ==
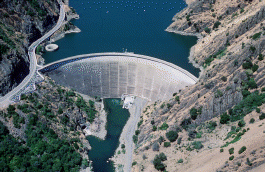
Monticello Dam, aerial view

Monticello Dam, a concrete arch dam, is the only major storage dam on the creek. It forms Lake Berryessa, which has a capacity of 1,602,000 acre-feet (1.976×10^{9} m^{3}), making it one of the largest reservoirs in the state of California. The dam and lake are part of the United States Bureau of Reclamation's Solano Project and was completed in 1957. The project's purpose is to provide water for irrigation, though it also supplies municipal and industrial water to major cities in Solano County. About 32,000 acre-feet (39,000,000 m^{3}) is provided by the project annually. An 11 MW hydroelectric plant generates electricity for the Solano Irrigation District, which owns and operates the dam.

The Putah Diversion Dam, or PDD, also constructed in 1957, diverts water into Putah South Canal about 6 miles (9.7 km) downstream of Monticello Dam. The dam is a gated concrete weir structure with an earth-fill embankment wing. It creates the small Lake Solano, which has a capacity of only 750 acre-feet (930,000 m^{3}). The canal is entirely concrete-lined except for a mile (1.6 km) of pipe called the Putah South Pipeline. Most of the lands are below the level of the canal and are served by gravity. Lands above pump water straight from the canal. The canal ends at Terminal Dam, which is made from earth-fill. The dam forms a small 119 acre-foot (147,000 m^{3}) reservoir called Solano Lake. This reservoir supplies drinking water to the city of Vallejo. Most of the canal is operated by Solano Irrigation District, including its headworks.

== Ecology ==
Steelhead trout (coastal rainbow trout) (Oncorhynchus mykiss irideus) and Chinook salmon (Oncorhynchus tshawytscha) continue to survive in Putah Creek. Although these anadromous salmonids cannot pass the Putah Diversion Dam, stream resident rainbow trout (the landlocked form of steelhead trout) continue to thrive above Monticello Dam in the upper headwaters and grow to large size in the first few miles directly below the dam.

The ecological centerpiece of the 2000 Putah Creek Accord mandated flow releases from the Putah Diversion Dam intended to secure spawning and rearing flows for spring-spawning native fishes with a natural flow regime of higher winter and spring flows, with lower summer and fall flows, but mandated sufficient perennial flow to support rearing salmonids. The Accord mandated a short three-day pulse to occur between 15 February and 31 March to initiate spawning behavior, followed by a month-long release of elevated flows. Further, the Accord established a schedule of monthly baseline flows designed to maintain continuous lotic (flowing) conditions year-round from the PDD to the Yolo Bypass. In December 2014, the California Fish and Game Commission designated Putah Creek a "Wild Trout Water" and efforts by citizen groups to restore the creek resulted in increased Chinook salmon rearing in the lower watershed. The natural flow regimes simulated by releases from the dams has restored native fishes while suppressing non-native fishes, the latter best adapted to warmer water and stagnant conditions. By increasing releases briefly in winter/spring and allowing much lower flows in late summer/fall, there has been little impact on overall water availability for diversion to agriculture and residents.

An interesting study of the Putah Creek watershed from a bioregional perspective can be found in "Lifeplace: Bioregional Thought and Practice" by Robert L. Thayer

== "Green River" ==
Putah Creek is also known as the Green River due to the buildup of algae and vascular plants in the late summer. Putah Creek is the subject of the Creedence Clearwater Revival song "Green River" and served as a childhood vacation spot for John Fogerty.

== See also ==
- Rivers of Lake County, California
- List of watercourses in the San Francisco Bay Area
