= Rocky Fire =

2015 wildfire in Northern California

- Part of the 2015 California wildfires
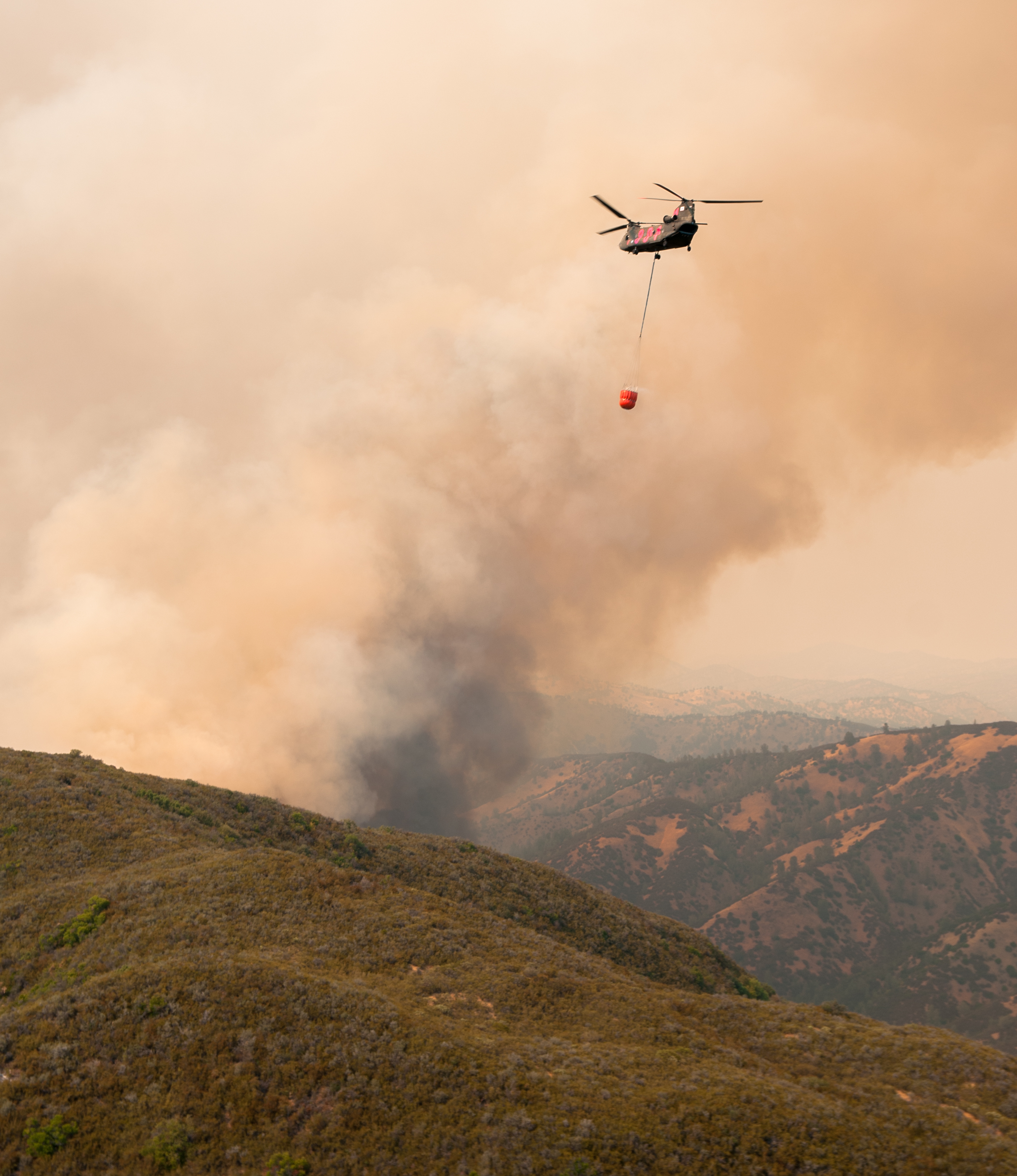
- A CH-47 Chinook helicopter of the California Air National Guard performs a water drop on the Rocky Fire
- Date: July 29 –; August 14, 2015; (17 days)
- Location: Lake, Colusa, and Yolo counties, Northern California, United States
- Coordinates: 38.89°N 122.476°W

Statistics
- Burned area: 69,438 acres (28,101 ha; 108 sq mi; 281 km^{2})

Impacts
- Evacuated: ~13,000
- Structures destroyed: 96 (8 damaged)
- Cost: $46.1 million; (equivalent to about $59.4 million in 2024)

Ignition
- Cause: Faulty water heater

Map
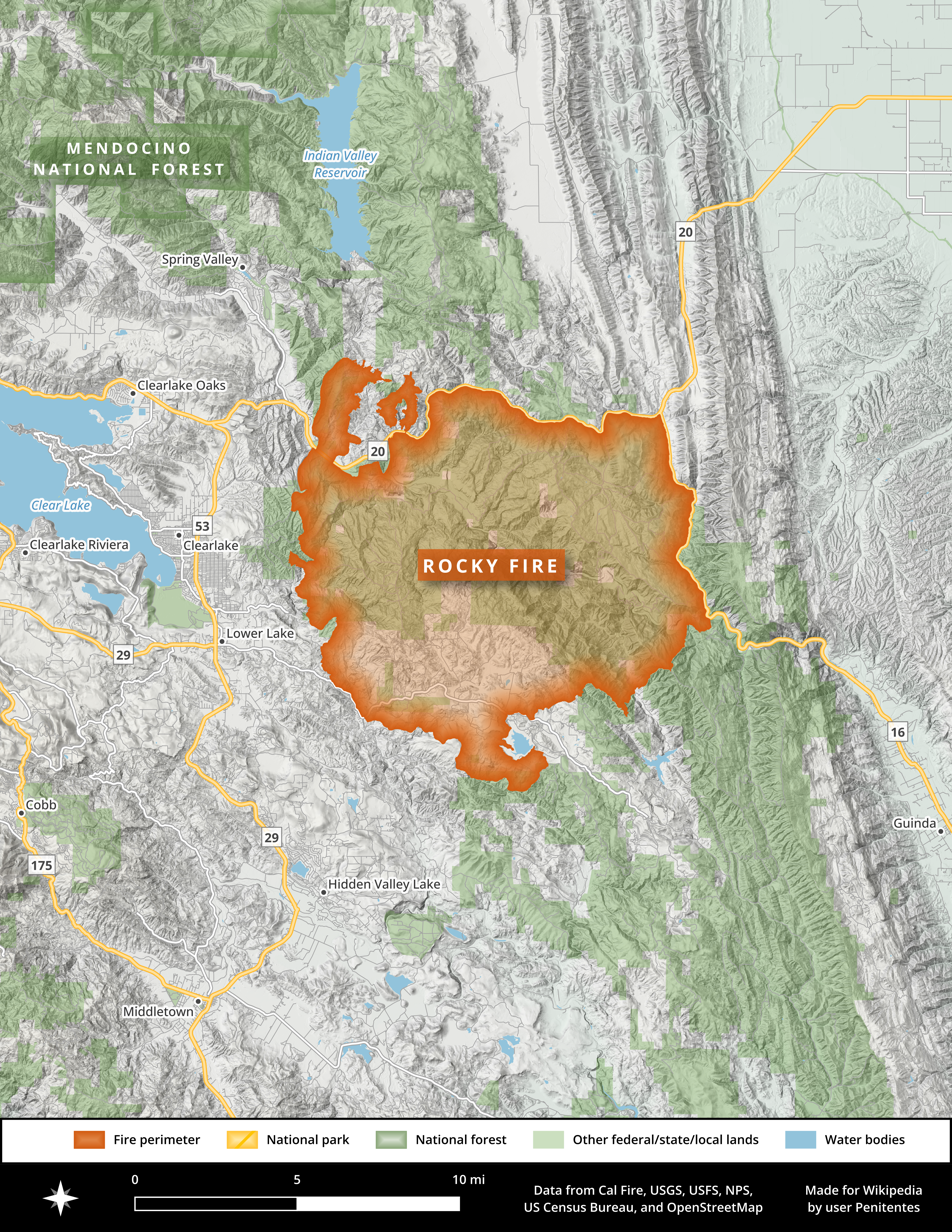
- The Rocky Fire's footprint east of Clear Lake

- The general location of the Rocky Fire in Northern California

The Rocky Fire was a large wildfire in Lake, Colusa, and Yolo counties in Northern California in 2015. The fire burned 69,438 acres (28,101 hectares) between its ignition on July 29 and its containment on August 14. Caused by a malfunctioning water heater used for illegal cannabis cultivation, the fire destroyed 96 structures and was the fifth largest fire of California's 2015 fire season.

== Background ==
The Rocky Fire burn area largely comprised rough terrain with oak woodlands, grasslands, and chaparral with no wildfire history going back "several decades", per state officials. This absence was partly attributable to fire suppression policies that prevented wildfires from periodically reducing the build-up of vegetation. Dense chaparral—more than six feet (1.8 m) tall in some areas—flourished in the meantime, providing plentiful fuel. A multiple-year drought began in 2011 and drove moisture levels in chamise brush, one of the vegetation types in the Rocky Fire burn area, to near-record lows by July 2015.

California's 2015 wildfire season was characterized by aggressive fires that, aided by drought conditions, remained active through the night instead of abating. By August 8, as the Rocky Fire was underway, the amount of state land burned in wildfires year-to-date was more than double the five-year average. The Rocky Fire was one of 52 wildfires to exceed 40,000 acres (16,000 ha) in the United States in 2015. In California, 8,283 wildfires burned a total of 880,899 acres (356,487 ha).

== Progression ==
The Rocky Fire began at a property on Morgan Valley Road, east of Clearlake in Lake County, at about 3:30 p.m. PDT on Wednesday, July 29, when a gas-powered water heater in an outbuilding caught fire and set nearby vegetation alight. Firefighters were initially dispatched to the incident based on a report of a structure fire on Rocky Creek Road; a second fire was later reported on Morgan Valley Road with an unknown cause. The fire was named for its proximity to Rocky Creek, which flows north of Morgan Valley Road.

High temperatures and winds helped the ensuing fire spread rapidly as it entered thick brush and woodlands, advancing forward by ember spotting. In several hours, the fire grew from 150 acres (61 ha) to 3,000 acres (1,200 ha), destroying several outbuildings and necessitating mandatory evacuation orders for about 500 people. A total of 350 firefighting personnel engaged the fire on the first day, joined by eight air tankers and eight helicopters.

By the following afternoon, the fire had burned 8,300 acres (3,400 ha) and forced residents of Lower Lake and nearby roads to evacuate while pushing into the Cache Creek Wilderness and Berryessa Snow Mountain National Monument. By that night, the Rocky Fire had burned 13,500 acres (5,500 ha) and was the largest active wildfire in Northern California.

Originally confined to a rugged area bounded by California State Route 29 to the west and Route 16 to the east, the fire became much more active on Saturday, August 1. Temperatures reached more than 100 °F (38 °C) and relative humidity levels approached zero percent. Using bulldozers, firefighters built containment lines ahead of the Rocky Fire's northern and eastern flanks. Toward the end of the day, the fire's rate of spread vastly exceeded what had been predicted by computer modeling, consuming 20,000–22,000 acres (8,100–8,900 ha) in a five-hour period. A Cal Fire public information officer described the growth as "really unprecedented in recent times, or in even veterans of our department’s recollection" for a wildfire not influenced by strong winds. The fire produced large pyrocumulus clouds that reached 35,000 feet (11,000 m) in altitude, which had a tendency to collapse and spread the fire erratically when their downdrafts reached the surface.

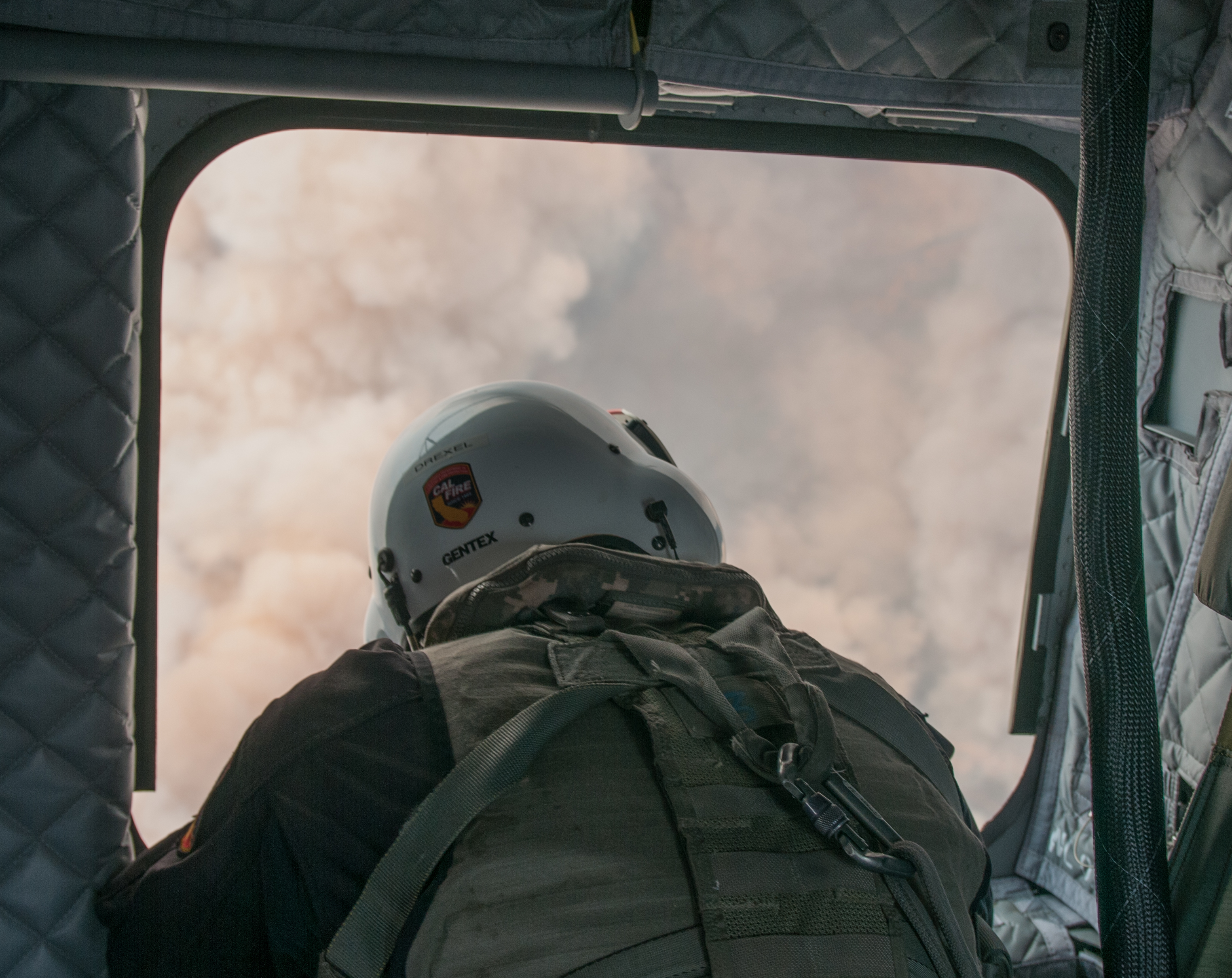
A Cal Fire captain looks out for potential hazards during a helicopter water bucket drop on August 1

The Rocky Fire continued to burn actively that night and through the following day. Fire personnel abandoned the containment lines they had built on the northern/eastern flanks, retreating several miles further north to California State Route 20 and further east to Route 16. There, they conducted firing operations, burning off fuel between the highways and the fire itself so as to halt its growth in those directions. The Rocky Fire reached approximately 54,000 acres (22,000 ha) in burned area with five percent containment by the end of Sunday, August 2.

Satellite view of the burn scar

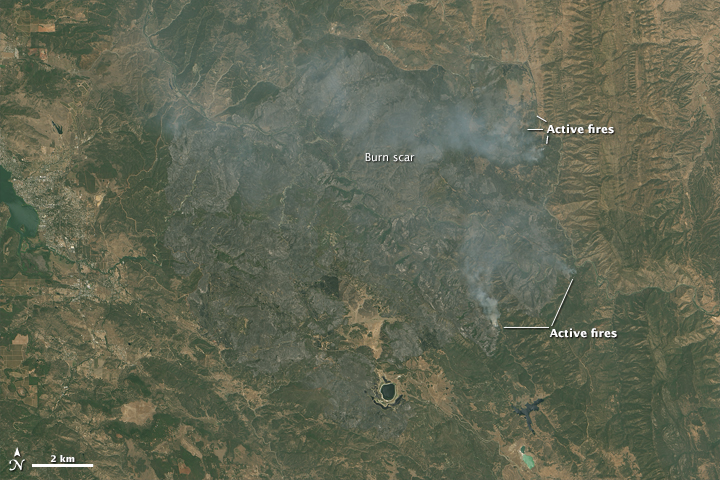
The Rocky Fire seen via natural color Landsat 8 satellite imagery on August 3, 2015

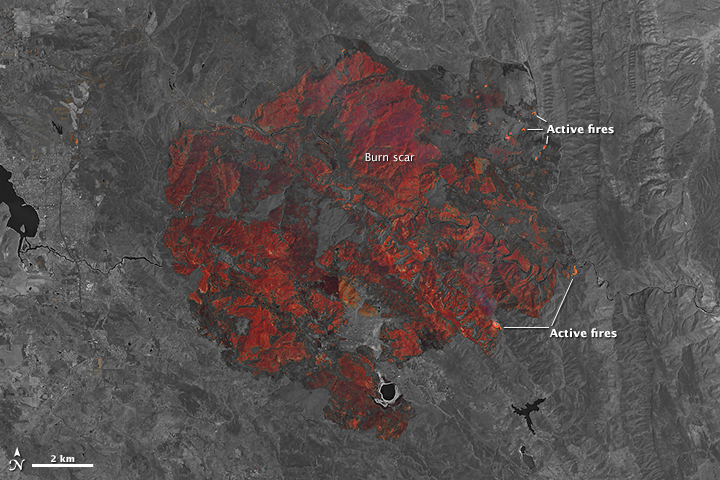
A simultaneous false-color composite image using short-wave infrared and near-infrared light

By Monday, August 3, fire activity was expected to calm as an incoming weather system brought temperatures down and relative humidity up. In the afternoon, the Rocky Fire crossed Route 20 to the north, despite the firing operations and other preparations the previous day. The fire burned upslope in a drainage near Cache Creek, creating a large plume that—in combination with a sudden wind shift—caused ember spotting up across the highway up to one mile (1.6 km) away in Long Valley. The fire proceeded to burn through a subdivision, destroying multiple structures, as it moved north towards Indian Valley Reservoir.

On Tuesday, August 4, White House Press Secretary Josh Earnest said that President Barack Obama had been briefed on the fire by Lisa Monaco, one of his national security advisors, and that the White House would continue to monitor the situation. The National Interagency Fire Center ranked the Rocky Fire as the highest-priority wildfire in the country for additional equipment and personnel. By August 5, at roughly 69,600 acres (28,166 ha), the Rocky Fire's burned area was more than four times that of any other active wildfire in California, though only the portion of the fire perimeter that had burned across Route 20 remained uncontained.

Later in the week, improved weather conditions allowed firefighters to double containment of the perimeter in two days. The number of personnel assigned to the Rocky Fire peaked at more than 3,500 on August 6. This included hundreds of inmates in the California Department of Corrections and Rehabilitation system, earning $1.45–$3.90 per hour plus a bonus one dollar per hour for working on a fire.

The fire was declared 100 percent contained on Friday, August 14. The total area burned in the fire was calculated at 69,438 acres (28,101 ha), adjusted down from 69,636 acres (28,181 ha) by more accurate mapping. According to the National Interagency Fire Center, the cost of fighting the fire came to $46.1 million at the time, or roughly equivalent to $59.4 million in 2024 when adjusted for inflation.

== Cause ==
On August 17, 2016, California Department of Forestry and Fire Protection (Cal Fire) officials announced that the Rocky Fire had been ignited by a malfunctioning gas-powered water heater strapped to a tree and housed in an outbuilding filled with flammable liquids, associated with an illegal cannabis growing operation. A spokesperson called the arrangement "inventive" but "not very safe". Two suspects in the fire—not named by Cal Fire—fled the country before investigators could question them. The Rocky Fire was one of five wildfires related to cannabis cultivation in Northern California in 2015.

== Effects ==
No injuries or deaths resulted from the Rocky Fire. Ninety-six structures were destroyed: 43 homes and 53 outbuildings. Eight structures were damaged. Most of the burned buildings were in the Morgan Valley area near the fire's origin. The Rocky Fire was the third most destructive fire of the year in California, surpassed by the Valley Fire in Lake County and the Butte Fire in Amador County.

The number of people under mandatory evacuation orders reached 1,480 at maximum; when including voluntary evacuation warnings approximately 13,000 people were affected. Some residents were forced to stay in hotels, some in the two Red Cross shelters established nearby, others in tents in parking lots. After fire growth and suppression operations forced their closure on August 1, California State Routes 20 and 16 re-opened on Friday, August 7. Evacuations were lifted and all road closures but one were lifted in the morning on Saturday, August 8.

=== Political response ===
On July 31, 2015, California governor Jerry Brown declared a state of emergency in response to the Rocky Fire and other wildfires burning in Northern California. On August 6, Brown visited the Rocky Fire area, meeting with impacted residents and firefighting personnel as well as using the opportunity to speak about the impacts of climate change in California.

=== Environmental impacts ===
Smoke from the fire was carried southeast towards Sacramento, where authorities issued air quality advisories for those with pre-existing respiratory issues. Lake County wineries fretted about the effects of the smoke on grape flavor, but as prevailing winds pushed smoke east instead of west towards the bulk of the county's vineyards, the impacts were "minimal to none".

== Growth and containment ==
Fire containment status Gray: contained; Red: active; %: percent contained
Date	Total area burned	Personnel	Containment
Jul 29	3,000 acres (1,214 ha)	315 personnel	
Jul 30	13,500 acres (5,463 ha)	918 personnel	
Jul 31	18,000 acres (7,284 ha)	1,300 personnel	
Aug 1	25,750 acres (10,421 ha)	1,940 personnel	
Aug 2	54,000 acres (21,853 ha)	2,737 personnel	
Aug 3	62,000 acres (25,091 ha)	3,145 personnel	
Aug 4	67,000 acres (27,114 ha)	3,478 personnel	
Aug 5	69,600 acres (28,166 ha)	3,483 personnel	
Aug 6	69,600 acres (28,166 ha)	3,551 personnel	
Aug 7	69,600 acres (28,166 ha)	2,966 personnel	
Aug 8	69,636 acres (28,181 ha)	2,420 personnel	
Aug 9	69,636 acres (28,181 ha)	2,367 personnel	
Aug 10	69,636 acres (28,181 ha)	1,344 personnel	
Aug 11	69,636 acres (28,181 ha)	773 personnel	
Aug 12	69,636 acres (28,181 ha)	361 personnel	
Aug 13 (Note: Reported acreage decreased by 198 acres (80 ha) between August 12 and August 13. This was due to more accurate mapping.)	69,438 acres (28,101 ha)	361 personnel	
Aug 14	69,438 acres (28,101 ha)	227 personnel	

== See also ==
- Glossary of wildfire terms
- List of California wildfires
- Valley Fire
- Butte Fire
- Jerusalem Fire
