= JKL Museum of Telephony =

American private museum

American Museum of Telephony
- JKL Museum of Telephony
- Established: 1999
- Location: Aptos, California, United States
- Coordinates: 37.0057°N 121.9645°W
- Type: Telephone and memorabilia museum
- Collection size: Telephones, switching equipment, military equipment, batteries, prototypes, directories
- Visitors: By appointment only
- Founder: John K. La Rue
- Website: Official website

The American Museum of Telephony, known as the JKL Museum of Telephony, is a private telephone and telephone memorabilia museum originally located in Mountain Ranch, California. The museum was destroyed in 2015 in the Butte Fire and is now located near Santa Cruz. It is open only for guided tours by appointment.

== History ==
The museum was registered in 1999 and takes its name from its founder, John K. La Rue, whose collection originally formed its basis.

The museum's collection, drawn from all over the world and dating back to the 1870s, has included switching equipment, military equipment, batteries, prototypes, and telephone memorabilia such as directories, in addition to working handsets of all eras. Founded in Mountain Ranch, in the Sierra foothills, it was destroyed in the Butte Fire on September 10, 2015.

The museum has been reestablished in Aptos, with the collection being rebuilt. Curators have included Wayne Merit and Remco Enthoven.
