= Frog Fire =

2015 wildfire in Northern California

- Part of the 2015 California wildfires
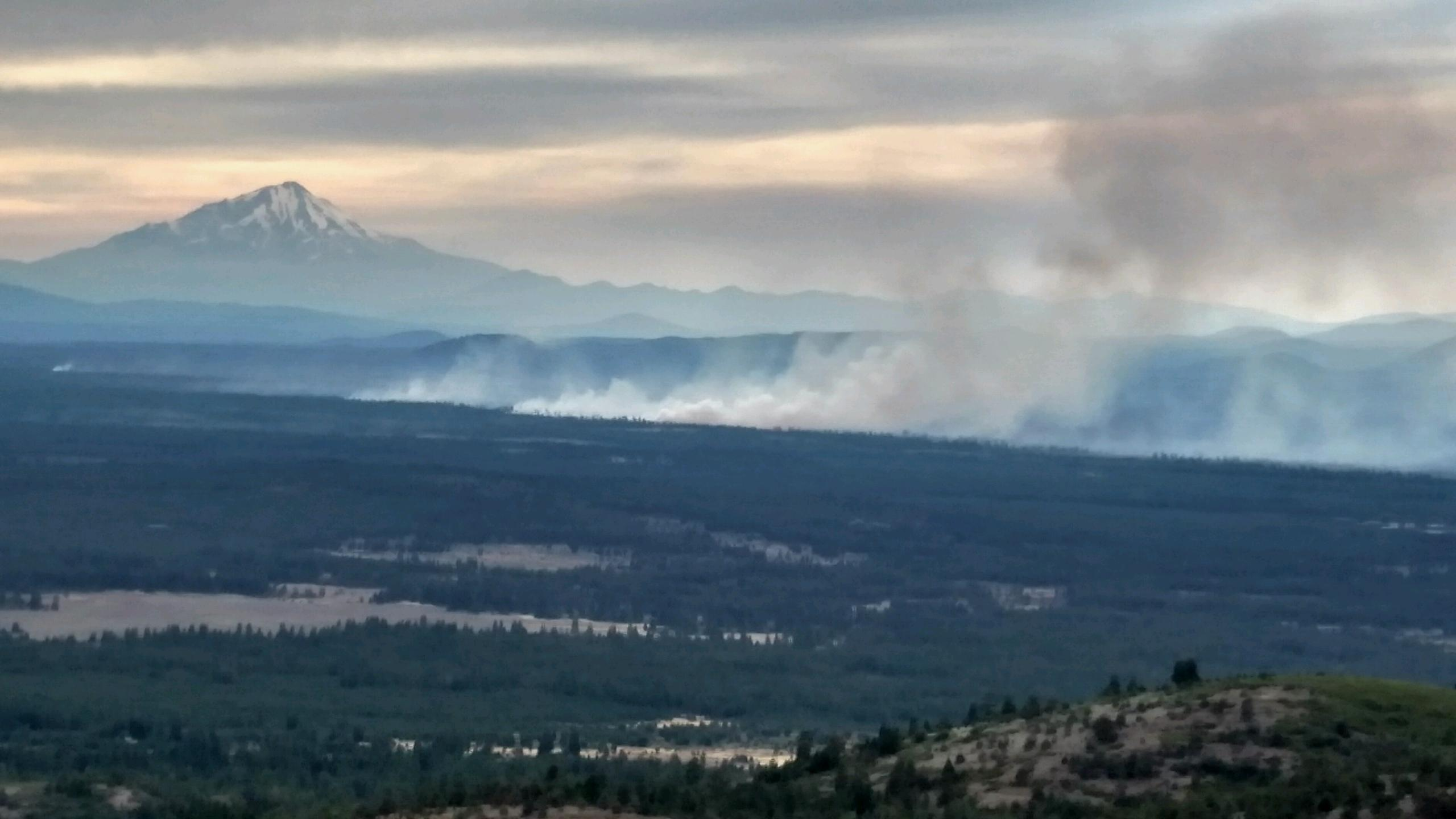
- Frog Fire with Mt Shasta in the background, August 4, 2015
- Date: July 30, 2015 –; August 20, 2015
- Location: Modoc National Forest, Lassen County, California
- Coordinates: 41.399°N 121.392°W

Statistics
- Burned area: 4,863 acres (20 km^{2})

Impacts
- Deaths: 1 Firefighter

Ignition
- Cause: Lightning

Map
- Location within Northern California

The Frog Fire was a fatal fire that occurred during the 2015 California wildfire season that burned 4,863 acres (1,968 ha) of land in the Modoc National Forest. The fire was one of many fires that was started on July 30 during a lightning storm.

== Fatality ==
On July 31, a United States Forest Service member from South Dakota died of carbon monoxide poisoning while battling the fire. David Ruhl, a captain with South Dakota's Black Hills National Forest, had vanished the night before.
