= Tassajara Fire =

2015 wildfire in Central California

- Part of the 2015 California wildfires
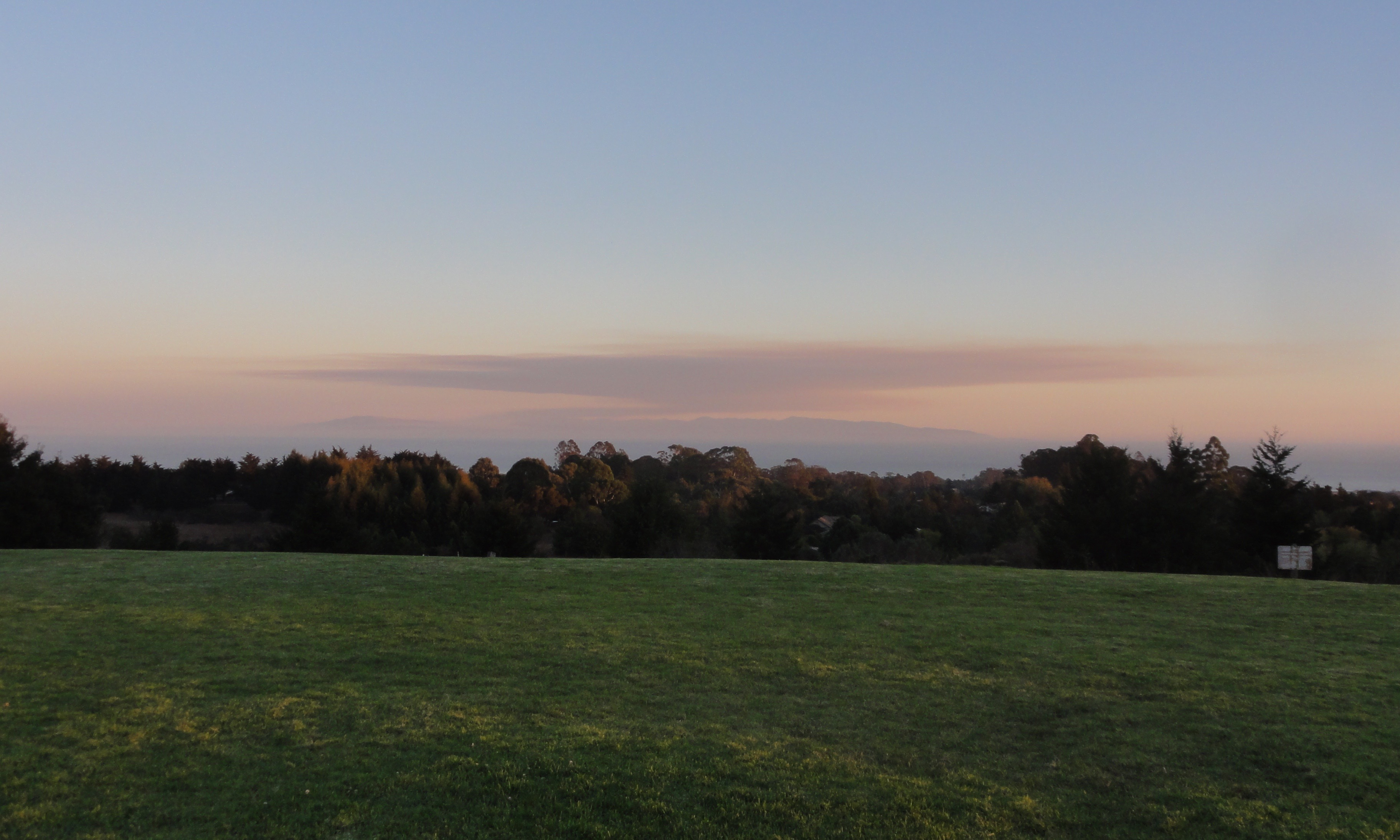
- View from UC Santa Cruz of the Tassajara Fire
- Date: September 12, 2015 –; September 27, 2015
- Location: Santa Lucia Range, Monterey County, California
- Coordinates: 36.3699644°N 121.589554°W

Statistics
- Burned area: 1,086 acres (4 km^{2})

Impacts
- Deaths: 1 civilian
- Structures lost: 12 structures; 8 outbuildings

Map
- Location within Northern California

The Tassajara Fire was a wildfire that started on September 20, 2015, in the Santa Lucia Range, in Monterey County, California.

The fire swiftly burned 1,086 acres (4 km^{2}) of land in a rural, residential area near the Los Padres Forest, including 12 homes and numerous outbuildings.

It was contained a week later on September 27.

The smoke plume was visible throughout the Monterey Bay and Salinas Valley regions.
