= Highway Fire =

2015 wildfire in California

- Date: April 18, 2015 - April 24, 2015
- Location: Riverside County, California

Statistics
- Burned area: 1,049 acres (4 km^{2})

Ignition
- Cause: Unattended Cooking Fire

The Highway Fire was a fire during the 2015 California Wildfire season. The fire started on April 18, 2015 by an unattended cooking fire. The fire burned 1,049 acres in Riverside County. There were 16 agencies involved, including Cal Fire. There were 54 personnel, 3 crews, and 4 engines assigned to the fire. The fire was contained on April 24, 2015.
