= 2015 California wildfires =

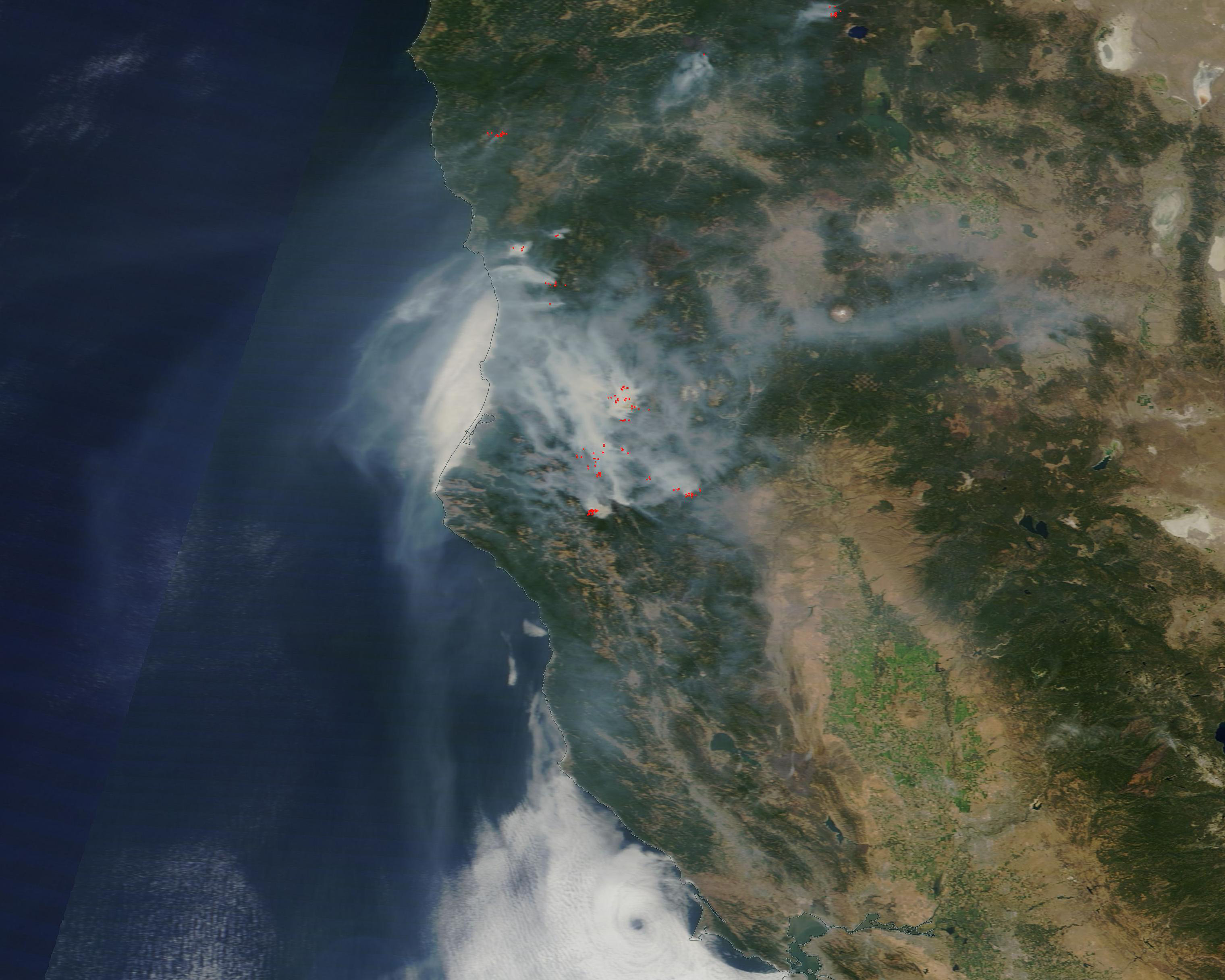
- Smoke from the 2015 California wildfires as seen from space, on August 18, 2015

Statistics
- Total fires: 8,745
- Total area: 893,362 acres (3,615 km^{2})

Impacts
- Deaths: 2 firefighters and 7 civilians killed
- Injuries: At least 1
- Cost: ≥4.771 billion (2015 USD)

Map
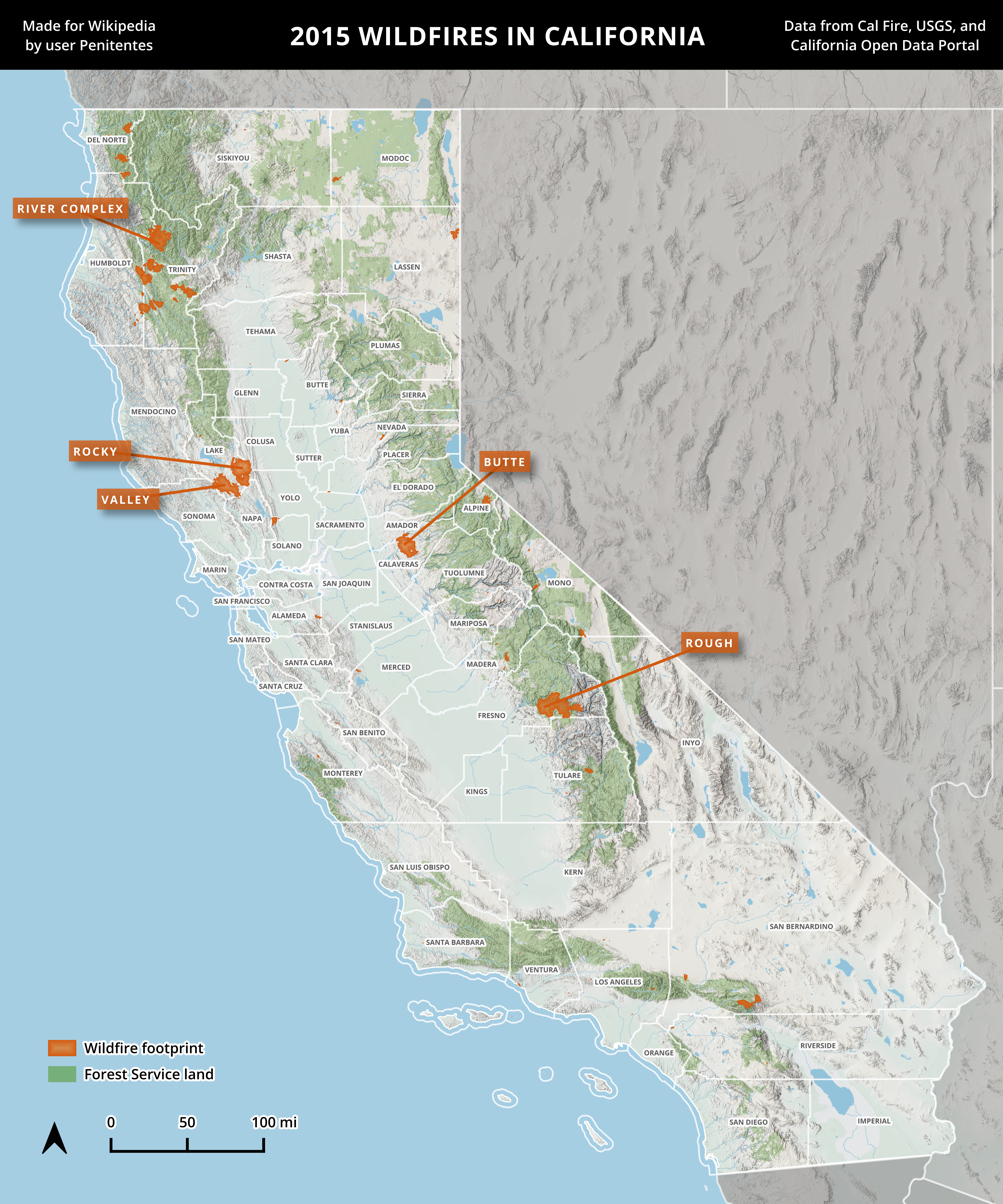
- A map of wildfires in California in 2015, using Cal Fire data

By the end of 2015 a total of 8,745 wildfires were recorded across the state of California, burning 893,362 acres (3,615 km^{2}). Approximately 3,159 structures were damaged or destroyed by wildfires, and at least 7 fatalities were recorded.

On September 11, after the Butte Fire exploded from a size of 32,000 acres (129 km^{2}) to 65,000 acres (263 km^{2}), in the Amador and Calaveras counties, Governor Jerry Brown declared a state of emergency.

== Background ==
The timing of "fire season" in California is variable, depending on the amount of prior winter and spring precipitation, the frequency and severity of weather such as heat waves and wind events, and moisture content in vegetation. Northern California typically sees wildfire activity between late spring and early fall, peaking in the summer with hotter and drier conditions. Occasional cold frontal passages can bring wind and lightning. The timing of fire season in Southern California is similar, peaking between late spring and fall. The severity and duration of peak activity in either part of the state is modulated in part by weather events: downslope/offshore wind events can lead to critical fire weather, while onshore flow and Pacific weather systems can bring conditions that hamper wildfire growth.

== Nationwide fire season ==
The National Interagency Fire Center reported in mid-August that the 2015 fire season had been the most destructive since 2011. Nationwide, three times as much land, for a total of 6,058,694 acres (24,519 km^{2}), had been burned since the 2014 season. By the end of August, in terms of the land area burned, the 2015 nationwide wildfire season had surpassed any other wildfire season in the last 10 years, with 7,825,559 acres (31,669 km^{2}) burned.

== Fatalities ==
The season also proved to be a deadly one for firefighters battling the many blazes throughout the state. A United States Forest Service member from South Dakota died on July 31 from carbon monoxide poisoning, while battling the Frog Fire in the Modoc National Forest. A second firefighter was killed on August 8 by a falling tree, while battling the Sierra Fire south of Echo Summit. A 72-year-old disabled woman was killed in her home by the fast-moving Valley Fire.

== List of wildfires ==
Below is a list of all fires that exceeded 1,000 acres (400 ha) during the 2015 California wildfire season, as well as the fires that caused significant damage. The information is taken from CAL FIRE's list of large fires, and other sources where indicated.

Name	County	Acres	Km^{2}	Start date	Containment Date (Note: Containment means that fire crews have established and secured control lines around the fire's perimeter. These lines are artificial barriers, like trenches or cleared vegetation, designed to stop the fire's spread, or natural barriers like rivers. Containment reflects progress in managing the fire but does not necessarily mean the fire is starved of fuel, under control, or put out.)	Notes	Ref
Round	Inyo	7,000	28.3	February 6, 2015	February 12, 2015		
Highway	Riverside	1,049	4.2	April 18, 2015	April 24, 2015		
Lake	San Bernardino	31,359	126.9	June 17, 2015	August 1, 2015		
Park Hill	San Luis Obispo	1,791	7.2	June 20, 2015	June 24, 2015		
North	San Bernardino	4,250	17.2	July 17, 2015	July 21, 2015	7 houses and 44 vehicles destroyed	
Wragg	Napa	8,051	32.6	July 22, 2015	August 6, 2015		
Rocky	Lake, Colusa, Yolo	69,438	281.0	July 29, 2015	August 14, 2015	96 structures destroyed	
Fork Complex	Shasta	36,503	147.7	July 30, 2015	November 3, 2015		
River Complex	Trinity	77,081	311.9	July 30, 2015	October 29, 2015		
Frog	Lassen	4,863	19.7	July 30, 2015	August 20, 2015	1 firefighter killed	
Humboldt Lightning	Humboldt	4,883	19.8	July 30, 2015	August 19, 2015		
Mad River Complex	Humboldt	73,137	296.0	July 30, 2015	September 13, 2015	includes Route Complex Fire	
Rough	Fresno	151,623	613.6	July 31, 2015	November 5, 2015		
Dodge	Lassen	10,570	42.8	August 3, 2015	August 17, 2015		
Gasquet	Del Norte	30,361	122.9	August 3, 2015	October 15, 2015	Fires: Feeder (100%), Coon (100%), Bear (100%) and Peak (100% containment)	
Jerusalem	Lake, Napa	25,118	101.6	August 9, 2015	August 25, 2015		
Cabin	Glendora	1,723	7.0	August 14, 2015	November 20, 2015	5 structures destroyed	
Cuesta	San Luis Obispo	2,446	9.9	August 16, 2015	August 28, 2015		
Tesla	Alameda	2,700	10.9	August 19, 2015	August 22, 2015		
Butte	Amador	70,868	286.8	September 9, 2015	October 1, 2015	2 civilians fatalities 475 residences & 343 outbuildings destroyed	
Valley	Lake	76,067	307.8	September 12, 2015	October 15, 2015	4 civilian fatalities, 1,955 structures destroyed; 6th most destructive wildfire in modern California history (as of 2022)	
Tassajara	Monterey	1,086	4.4	September 19, 2015	September 27, 2015	1 civilian fatality	
Solimar	Ventura	1,388	5.6	December 25, 2015	December 29, 2015	1 minor ankle injury	

== Gallery of maps ==
Maps of significant wildfires in 2015 in California

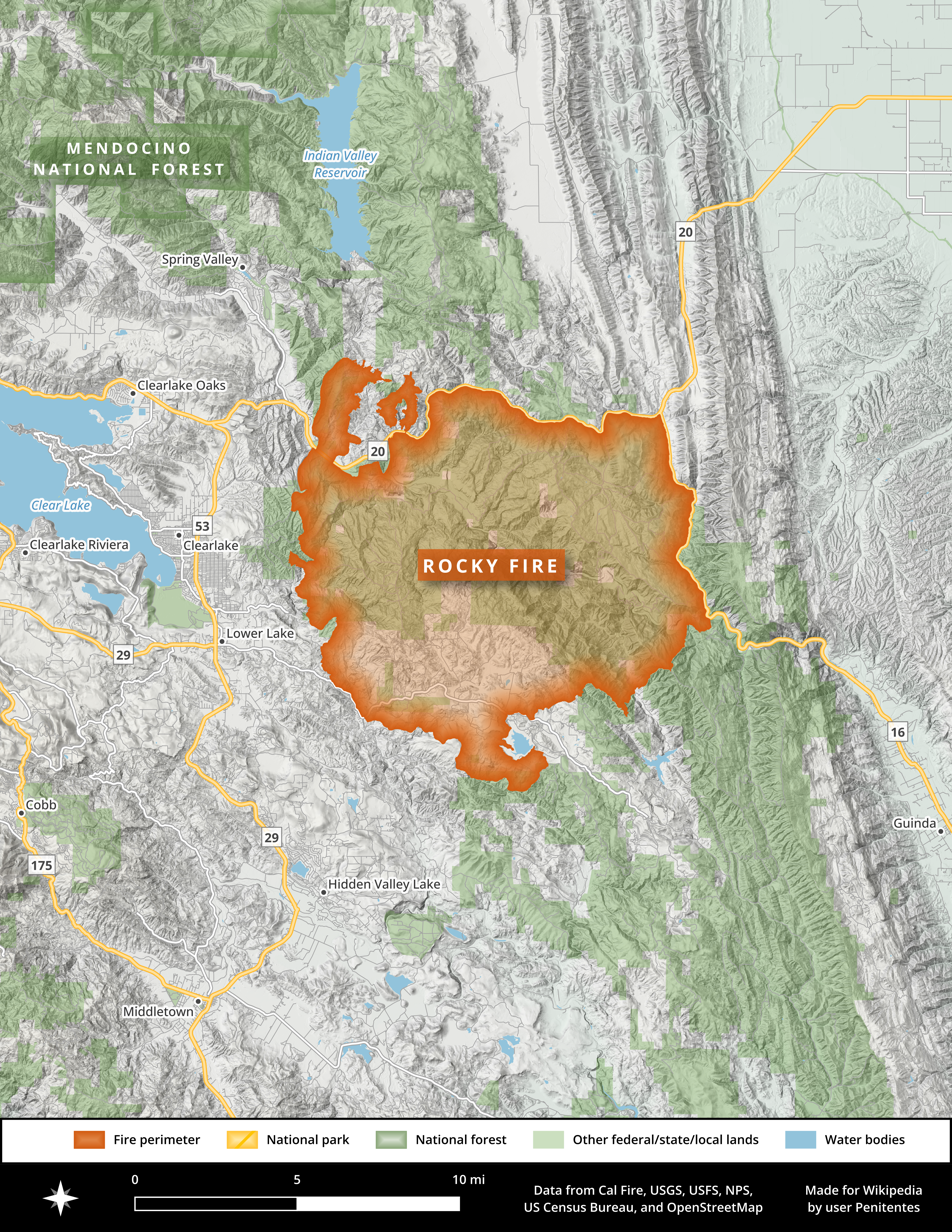
Rocky Fire

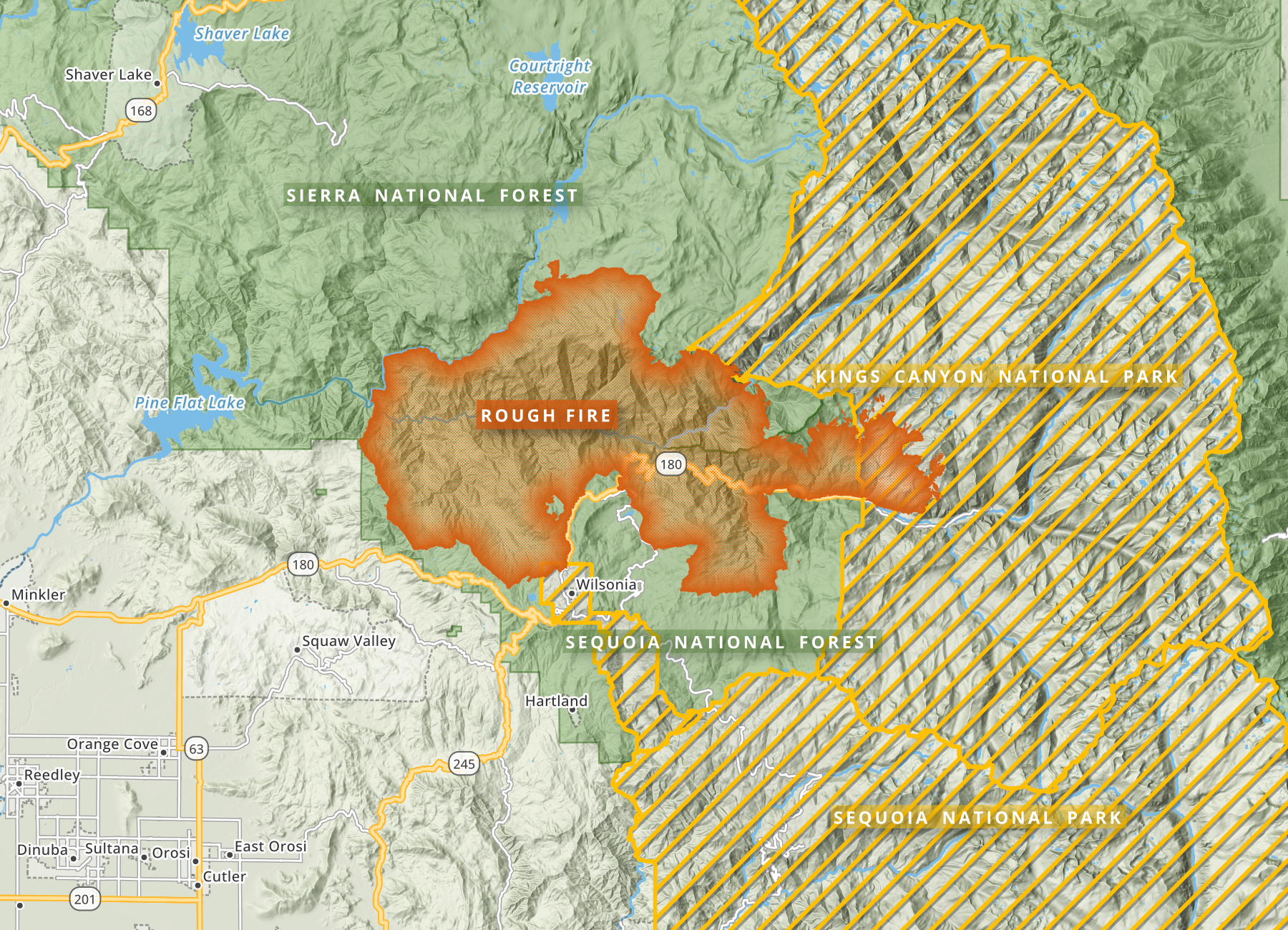
Rough Fire

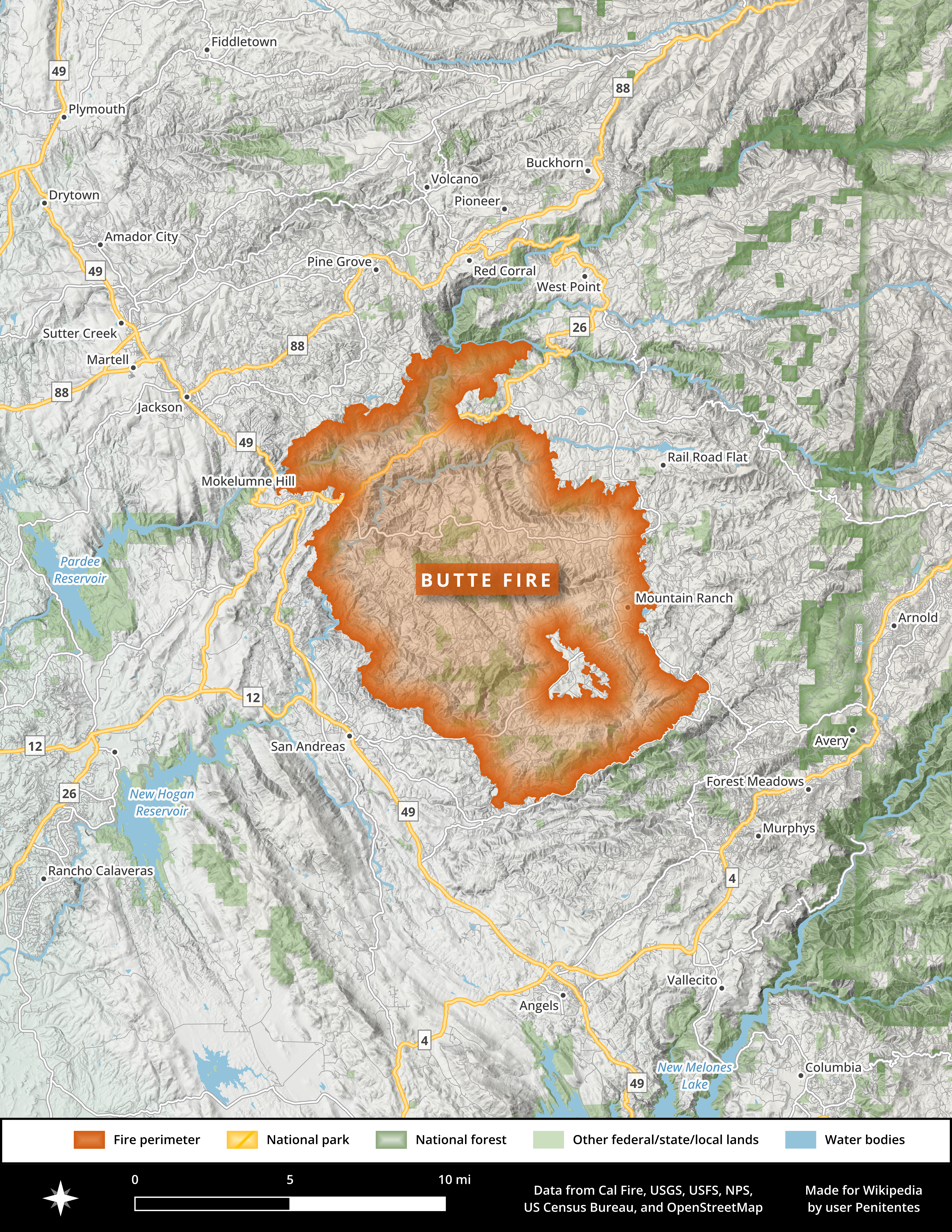
Butte Fire

== See also ==
- List of California wildfires
- 2015 Oregon wildfires
- 2015 Washington wildfires
- Climate change in California
- 2014–15 North American winter
