= Jerusalem Fire =

2015 wildfire in Northern California

- Part of the 2015 California wildfires
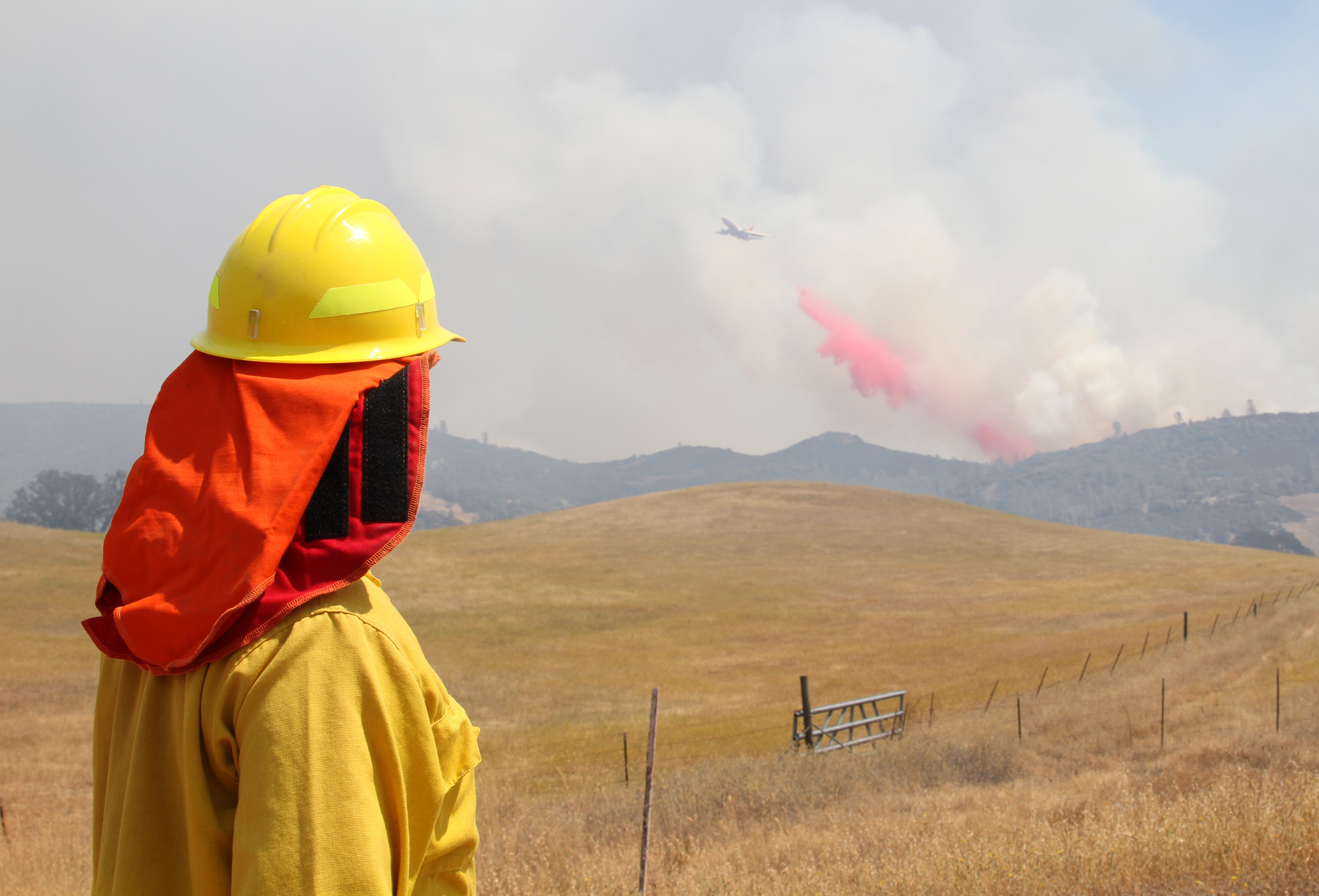
- An air tanker drops fire retardant on the Jerusalem Fire
- Date: August 9, 2015 –; August 25, 2015
- Location: Jerusalem Valley, Middletown, Lake County, California
- Coordinates: 38.8142503°N 122.4867319°W

Statistics
- Burned area: 25,118 acres (102 km^{2})

Impacts
- Structures lost: 6 residences; 21 outbuildings

Map
- Location of Jerusalem Fire in California

The Jerusalem Fire was a wildfire that burned in Lake County, California, during the 2015 California wildfire season. The fire, which started on August 9, burned 25,118 acres (102 km^{2}) before it was contained on August 25. Around 800 of the fire crews from Cal Fire, or just under half, were inmates from the California prison system.

On August 12, Cal Fire officials confirmed that the northern edge of Jerusalem Fire had come into contact with the southern areas of Rocky Fire, and that the two fires had merged. They added that while the incidents would now both be operated under a unified command, they would retain their own names, acreage counts and containment dates.

By August 15, many of the evacuation orders had been lifted from the area but returning residents were warned to watch for down power lines that still could pose hazards.
