= Lake Fire (2015) =

2015 wildfire in Southern California

- Part of the 2015 California wildfires
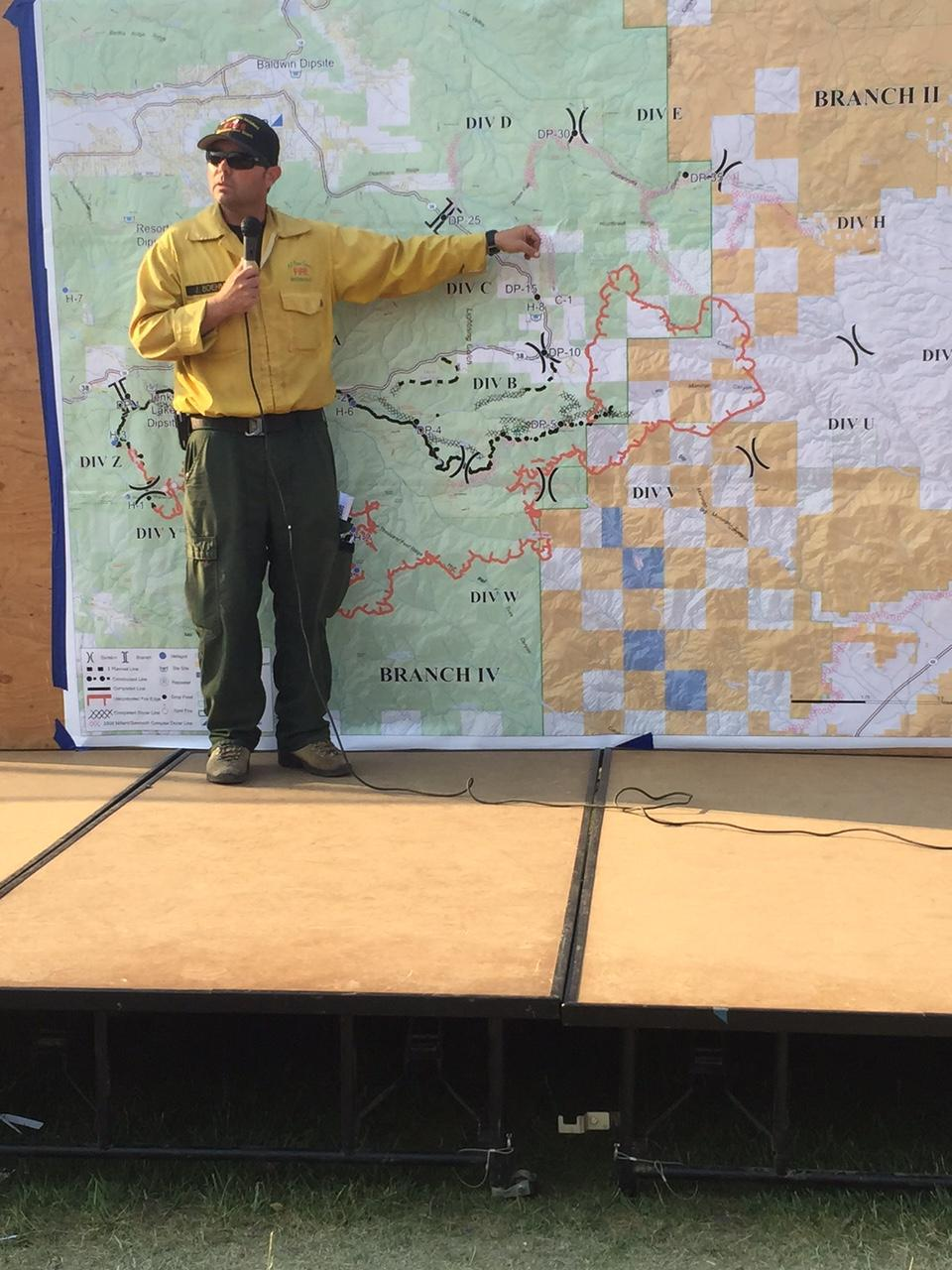
- Operations Section Chief explains the operations map on June 25th.
- Date: June 17, 2015 –; July 21, 2015
- Location: San Bernardino National Forest, San Bernardino County, California
- Coordinates: 34.16°N 116.893°W

Statistics
- Burned area: 31,359 acres (49.00 sq mi; 12,690 ha)
- Land use: Rural Fringe Areas

Impacts
- Injuries: 6
- Structures destroyed: 1 residences burned/3 outbuildings burned
- Cost: $39.9 million

The Lake Fire was a wildfire that burned in the San Bernardino National Forest. The fire started on June 17, 2015, and burned over 31,359 acres before it was fully contained on July 21, 2015.

The fire was first reported at 4 p.m. on June 17, 2015, just South of Big Bear Lake in San Bernardino County, and grew extremely quickly in the surrounding densely wooded mountain areas at an elevation of between 6,000 and 9,000 feet. At around 1,500 acres Aerial firefighting operations had begun including approximately eight tankers and a DC-10 Air Tanker from Medford, Oregon, loaded with 11,600 gallons of Fire retardant. But due to heavy smoke, aerial operations were having trouble seeing the blaze but estimated that if left unrestrained, the area it could burn in two days could exceed 50,000 acres. With the help of firefighting and fire prevention efforts, the actual two-day fire progress reached about 15,000 acres. An additional two tankers had been brought in to help combat the fire, but were soon grounded along with the others due to there not being enough firefighters on the ground to take advantage of the retardant.

Under the Command Incident Commander Norm Walker, over 1,900 firefighters fought tirelessly against the blaze aided by aerial operations. On June 24 a hobby drone Quadcopter flying in the area forced air operations to shut down immediately as a collision between the drone and aircraft could be fatal to those onboard. United States Forest Service Aviation Officer Mike Eaton said a tactical group supervisor flying an aircraft at 11,500 feet spotted the drone flying between his plane and another firefighting plane flying at 10,500 feet. Eaton said the presence of the drone kept firefighters from delivering 5,000 gallons of fire retardant on the flames and shut down subsequent missions that could have contained a part of the fire.

Later that day, the San Bernardino County Sheriff's Department initiated a mandatory evacuation for the Burns Canyon and Rimrock areas. More evacuations soon followed as the burn area reached approximately 30,000 acres, and included areas along Hwy 38 east of Angelus Oaks, Barton Flats, Seven Oaks, South Fork, Heart Bar and Rainbow Lane.

As of June 26 firefighting resources on scene included: 153 Fire engines, 4 air tankers (including one DC-10), 18 helicopters, 4 support fixed wing planes, 54 handcrews, 18 Water Tenders, 8 Bulldozers, and 2,116 personnel. Around this time the containment fell from 27% to 19%.

As July 2 rolled around, the majority of the fire had reached a containment level of 70% and the U.S. Forest Service reduced the personnel deployed to fight the blaze to just more than 1,400, down from nearly 2,300 personnel assigned to the fire just a few days before.

By July 13, 2015, fire investigations had determined that human activity - likely arson- was the cause of the blaze that destroyed at least 4 buildings and over 30,000 acres. On July 21 the fire was fully contained and while there were no fatalities or serious injuries, 6 minor injuries were reported during the battle with the inferno. The operation to control the blaze cost $39.9 million.
