= Mad River Complex Fire =

2015 wildfire in California

- Part of the 2015 California wildfires
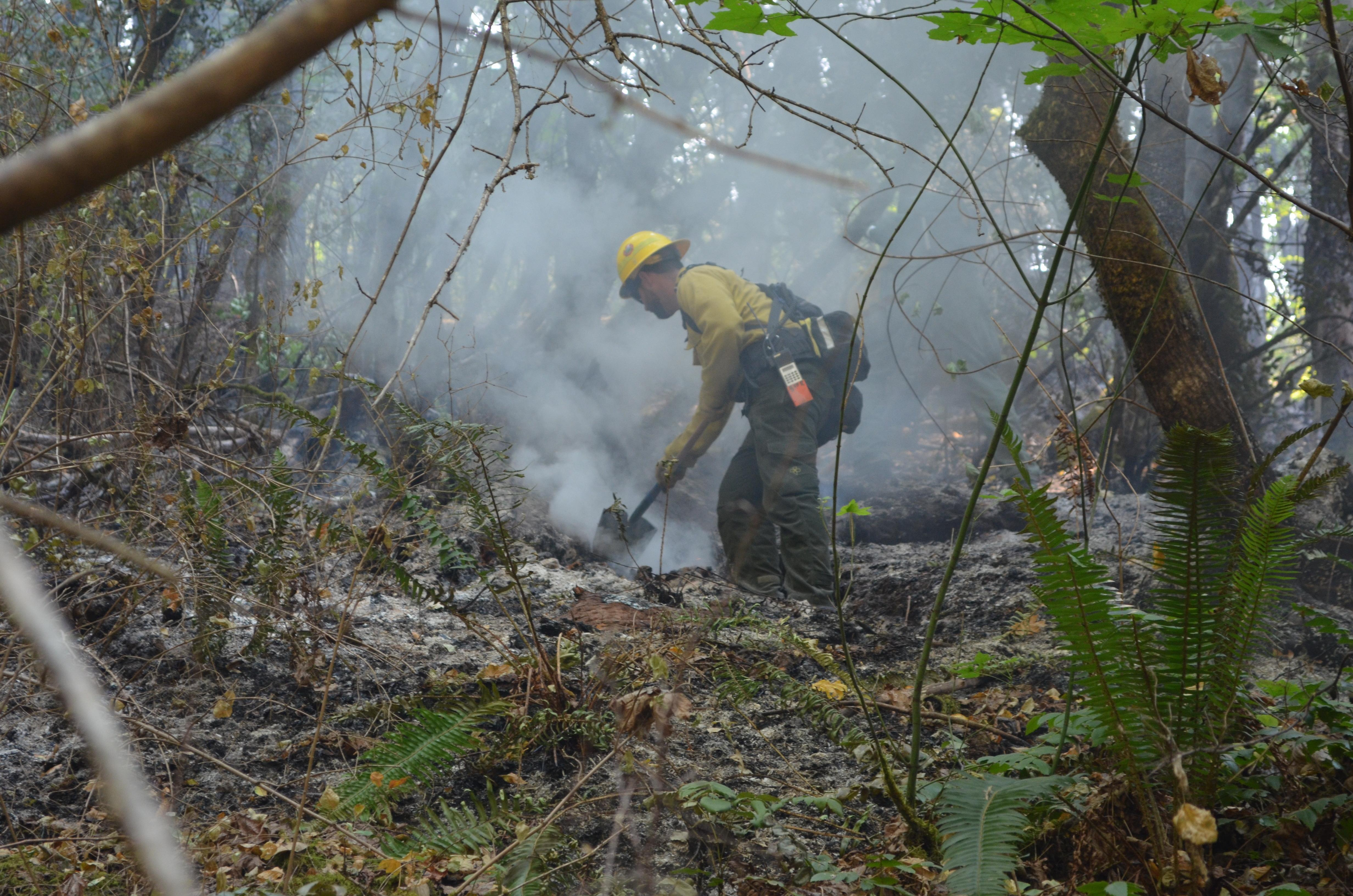
- Firefighter at the River Complex Fire.
- Date: July 30, 2015 – September 13, 2015
- Location: Trinity County, California

Statistics
- Burned area: 73,137 acres (296 km^{2})

Ignition
- Cause: Lightning Strike

The Mad River Complex Fire was a group of fires during the 2015 California wildfire season. The fires started on July 30, 2015, in Trinity County due to lightning strikes. It burned 73,137 acres. Some of the fuels involved were dry from the drought in the area, making them easier to burn. The River Complex Fire was part of this fire, making it a "complex" fire. It was contained on September 13, 2015.
