= Cuesta Fire =

2015 wildfire in Southern California

- Part of the 2015 California wildfires
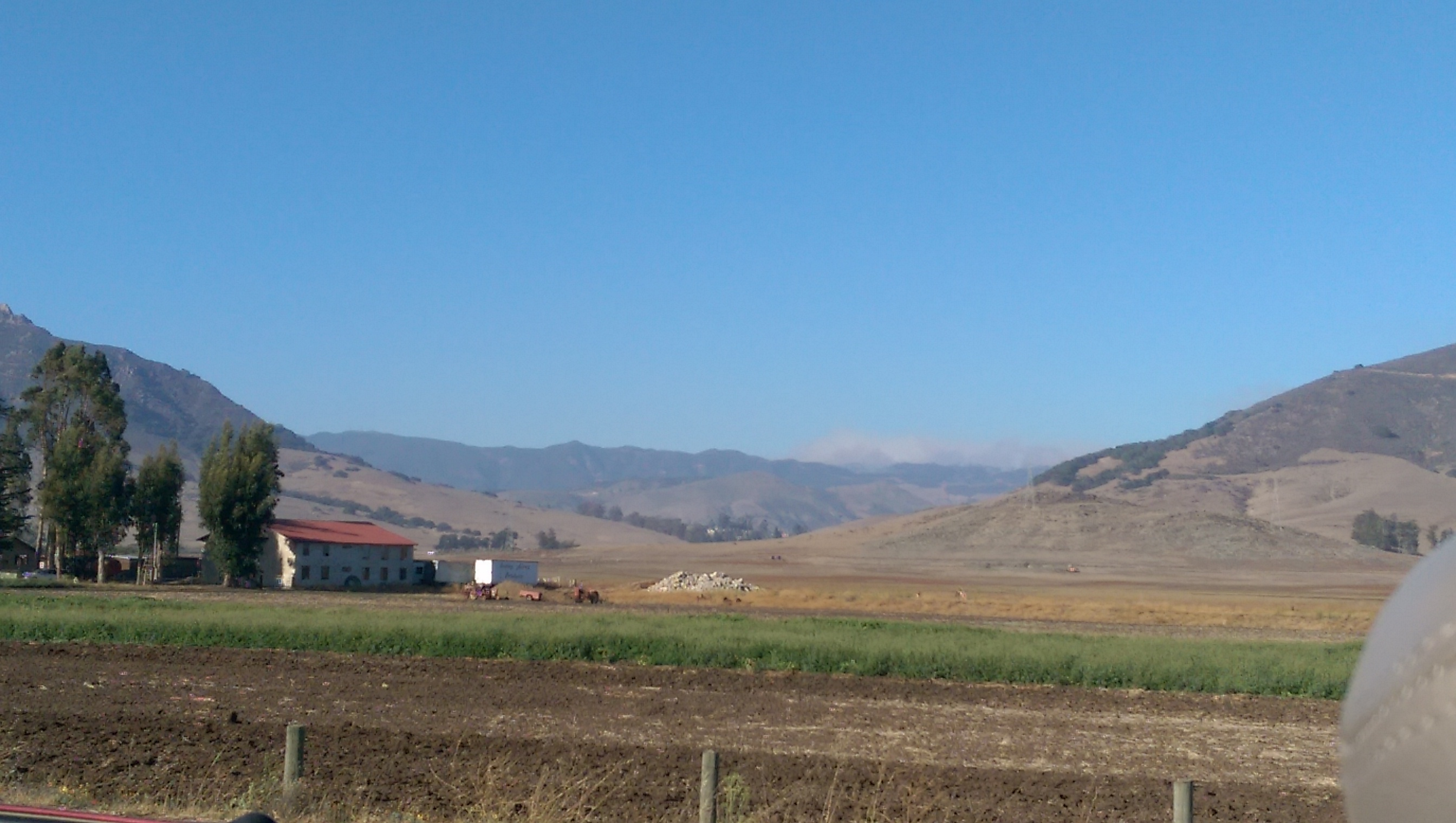
- Cuesta Fire from the south
- Date: August 16, 2015 –; August 28, 2015
- Location: Santa Lucia Range, San Luis Obispo County, California
- Coordinates: 35.3477°N 120.6269°W

Statistics
- Burned area: 2,446 acres (9.90 km^{2})

Impacts
- Injuries: 1
- Structures destroyed: 1

Ignition
- Cause: Vehicle dragging chain

Map
- Location of fire in Southern California.

The Cuesta Fire was a wildfire that started on 16 August 2015 near U.S. Route 101 and the Cuesta Grade, in the Santa Lucia Range just north of San Luis Obispo in San Luis Obispo County, California. The fire was contained on 28 August, and had burned 2,446 acres, some within the Los Padres National Forest.

== Fire ==
Evacuations were ordered for the area of California State Route 58 south of the Railroad Track area of Santa Margarita and the area of Miller Flat. As of 20 August 2015, evacuations orders were lifted. The evacuation center was at Santa Rosa Academy in Atascadero. As of 20 August 2015, 1,600 firefighters were fighting the fire.

A vehicle is blamed with starting the fire, which started three additional fires nearby, all of which were extinguished.

Within 24 hours the fire had grown from 100 acres to 500 acres.

== See also ==
- Santa Lucia Range topics
