= Park Hill Fire =

2015 wildfire in California, United States

- Date: June 20, 2015 - June 24, 2015
- Location: San Luis Obispo County, California

Statistics
- Burned area: 1,791 acres (7 km^{2})

Impacts
- Injuries: 4
- Structures lost: 23
- Cost: Estimated $3.5 Million (2015 U.S. $)

Ignition
- Cause: Vehicle

The Park Hill Fire was a fire during the 2015 California Wildfire season. It started on June 20, 2015 in San Luis Obispo County by a chunk of coal that flew out of the exhaust pipe of a vehicle. The fire burned 1,791 acres, destroyed 23 buildings, and 4 people were injured by or during the fire. CalFire had 15 personnel and 3 engines working on the fire. The fire was contained on June 24, 2015.
