= Wragg Fire =

2015 wildfire in Northern California

- Part of the 2015 California wildfires
- Date: July 22, 2015 –; August 5, 2015
- Location: Lake Berryessa, California, United States
- Coordinates: 38.4994°N 122.1145°W

Statistics
- Burned area: 8,051 acres (33 km^{2})

Impacts
- Structures lost: 2

Ignition
- Cause: Car exhaust from idling car

Map
- Location of fire in California.

The Wragg Fire was a wildland fire that started just off California State Route 128 near Lake Berryessa in Napa County, California in the United States. The fire started on July 22, 2015. The cause was an idling vehicle's car exhaust. The vehicle came into contact with dry grass and sparked the fire. Mandatory evacuations for 136 homes and 200 residents took place. Six roads were closed temporarily as a result.

== Overview ==
The fire began on July 22, 2015, at 2:24 PM on California State Route 128 near Lake Berryessa in Napa County, California. Parts of both Highway 128 and Interstate 505 were closed. On July 24, the highway and interstate were reopened. Stebbins Cold Canyon Reserve was closed and evacuation orders were called off. The fire was fought by 1,825 firefighters, 75 fire engines and 6 helicopters.

As of July 28, the fire was 80% contained. That day the fire reignited over 500 acres, going over the containment line, in Wildfire Canyon near Vacaville in Solano County around 1:30PM. Seven roads were closed and 136 homes and 200 residents were required to evacuate as a result of the flare-up. An evacuation center was created in Vacaville. The fire was caused by an idling car's exhaust. The car came into contact with dry grass and the car exhaust ignited the fire. In total, the fire burned 8,051 acres.

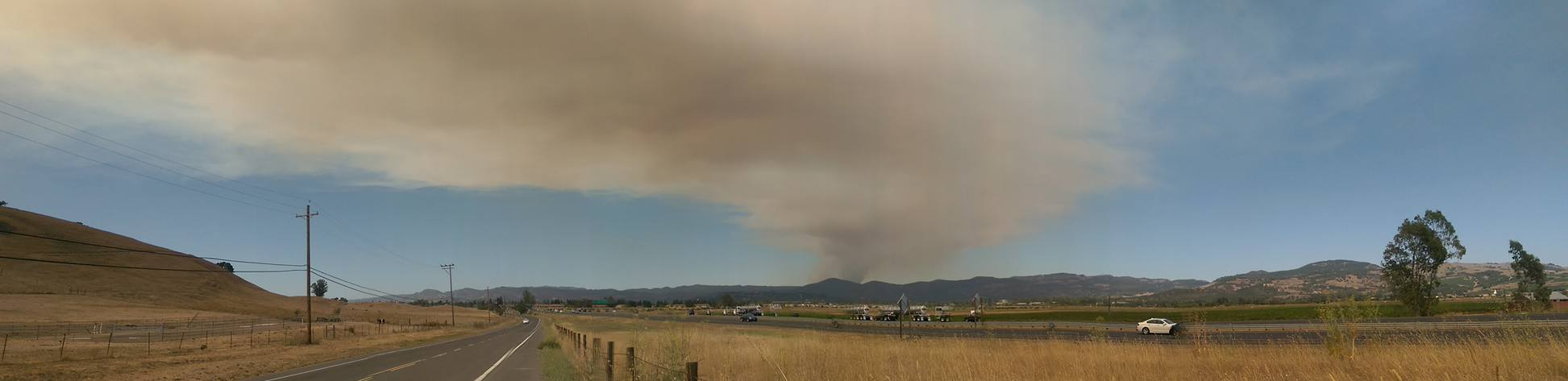
Wragg Fire over Napa, California

== See also ==
- 2015 California wildfires
