= Humboldt Complex fires =

2015 wildfire in Northern California

Humboldt Lightning Fire
- Part of the 2015 California wildfires
- Date: July 30, 2015 –; September 19, 2015
- Location: Humboldt County, California

Statistics
- Burned area: 4,883 acres (20 km^{2})
- Land use: Timber

Impacts
- Injuries: 14
- Structures lost: 7

Ignition
- Cause: Lightning Strike

The Humboldt Complex or Humboldt Lightning Fires were a series of wildfires during the 2015 California wildfire season. The fire started on July 30, 2015 in Humboldt County, California. The fire was started by a lightning strike from a thunderstorm that started multiple fires that day. The fire burned 4,883 acres, destroyed 7 buildings, and injured 14 people.

The fire was burning in steep terrain with limited access. Fuels include heavy timber that was being used for revenue and income.

There were 8 agencies working at this fire. 1,392 personnel and 39 crews were assigned to the fire. Resources for the fire included 10 helicopters, 57 engines, 8 bulldozers, and 10 water tenders.
