= Butte Fire =

2015 wildfire in Amador County, California

- Part of the 2015 California wildfires
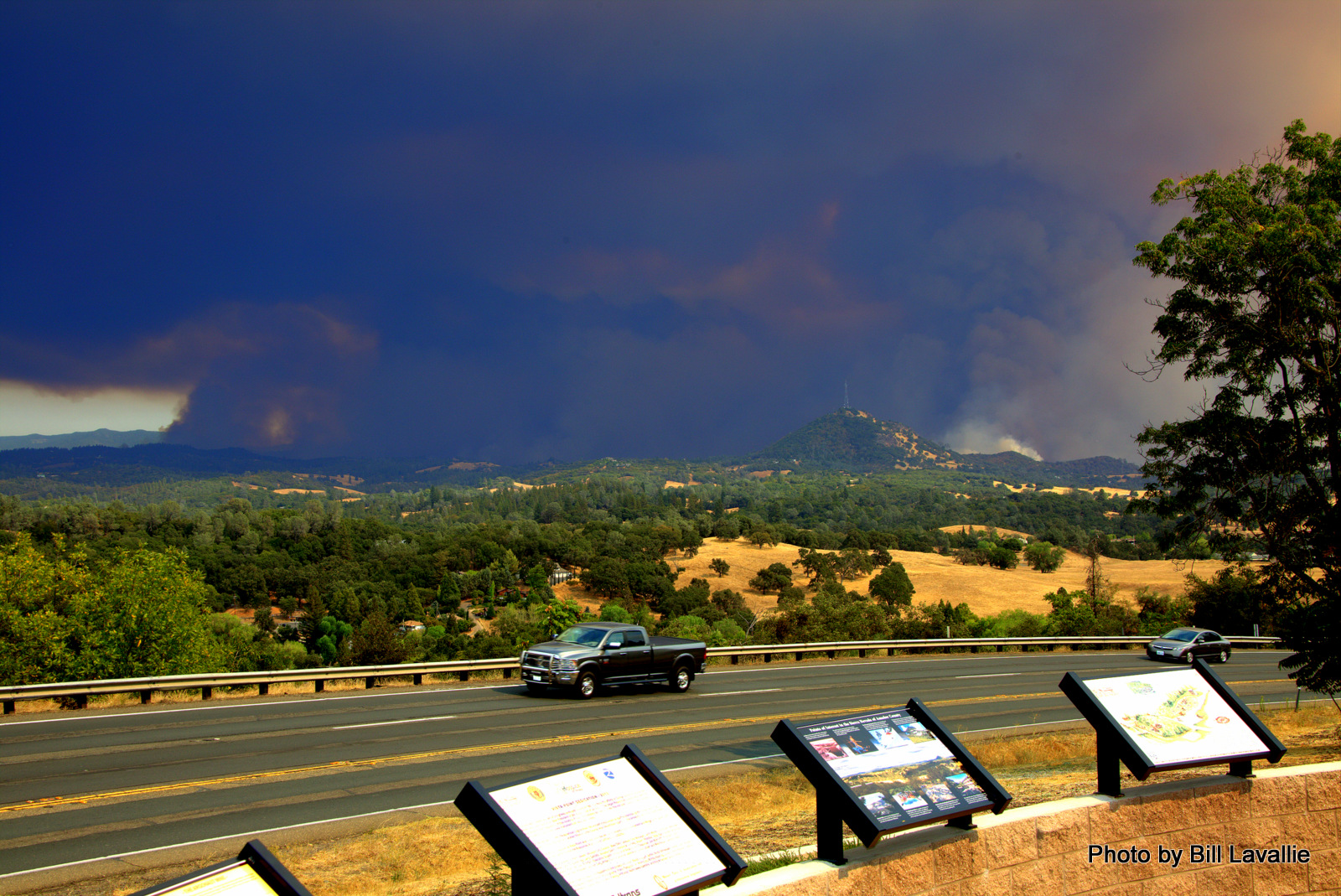
- Date: September 9, 2015 –; October 1, 2015; (22 days)
- Location: Amador County, California, United States
- Coordinates: 38.32974°N 120.70418°W

Statistics
- Burned area: 70,868 acres (28,679 ha; 111 sq mi; 287 km^{2})

Impacts
- Deaths: 2
- Structures lost: 965 Residential, Commercial and Other
- Cost: $74.7 million; (equivalent to about $96.3 million in 2024)

Map
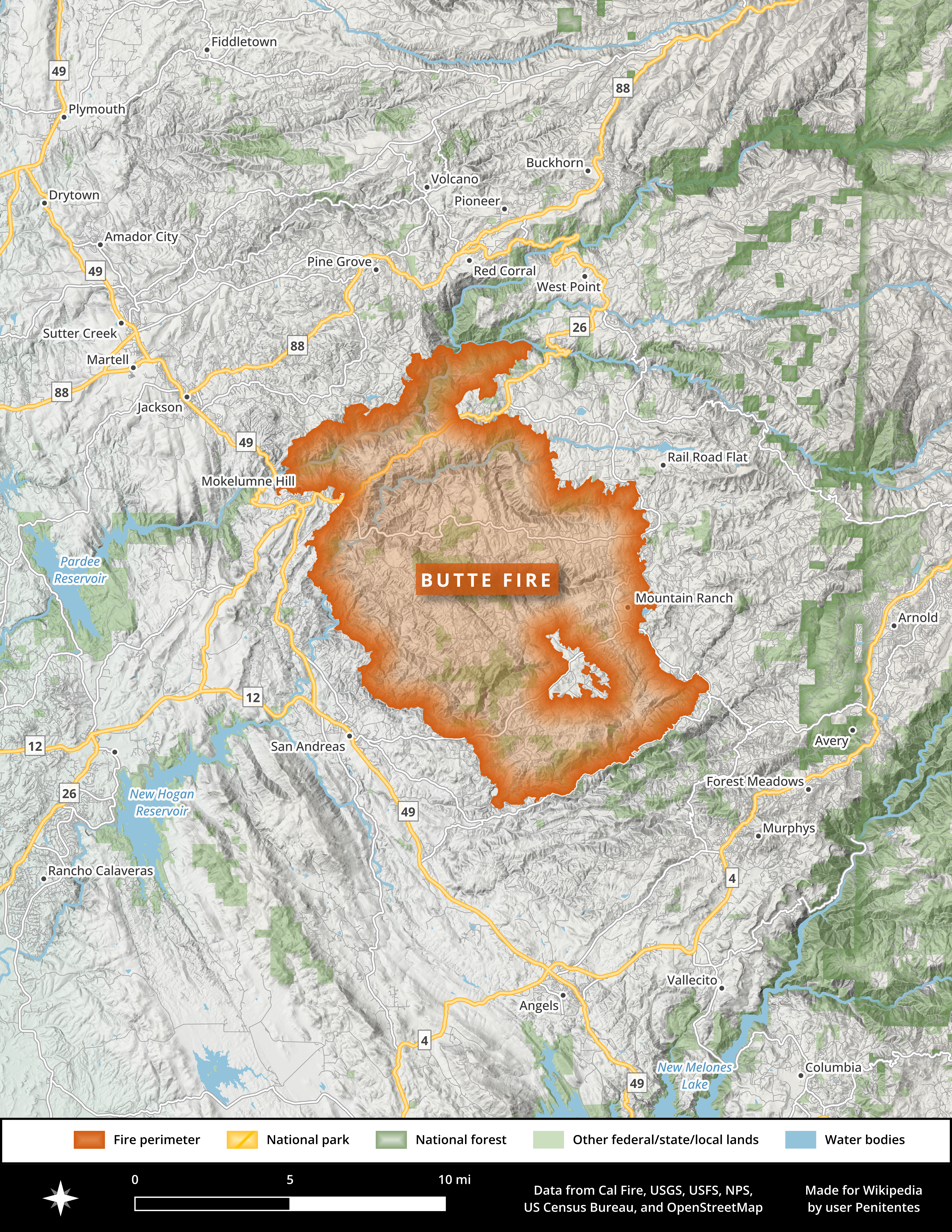
- The footprint of the Butte Fire

- Location of fire in California

The Butte Fire was a rapidly moving wildfire during the 2015 California wildfire season that started on September 9 in Amador County, California. The fire burned 70,868 acres (287 km^{2}).

The fire started at 2:26 P.M. on Wednesday, September 9, just east of Jackson, when a tree came into contact with a power line. Over the next hours, it grew to over 14,500 acres (59 km^{2}). The next day, it had reached 32,000 acres (129 km^{2}). Officials stated that the fire was expanding in all directions and that efforts were being hampered by difficult topography.

Early on Friday, September 11, Cal Fire issued a mandatory evacuation for all of San Andreas, as the fire exploded again to 64,000 acres (259 km^{2}), but at 4:30 P.M. PDT, that order was lifted. Officials from the Amador County Unified School District chose to close all schools in the district on Friday as well. Later that day, as the fire continued to grow, Governor Jerry Brown declared a state of emergency in Amador and Calaveras counties.

On September 16, the Calaveras County coroner announced that the bodies of two people had been found in the Mokelumne Hill and Mountain Ranch areas.

The total cost of fighting the Butte Fire was estimated by the National Interagency Fire Center at $74.7 million.

== Wildfire victim claims ==
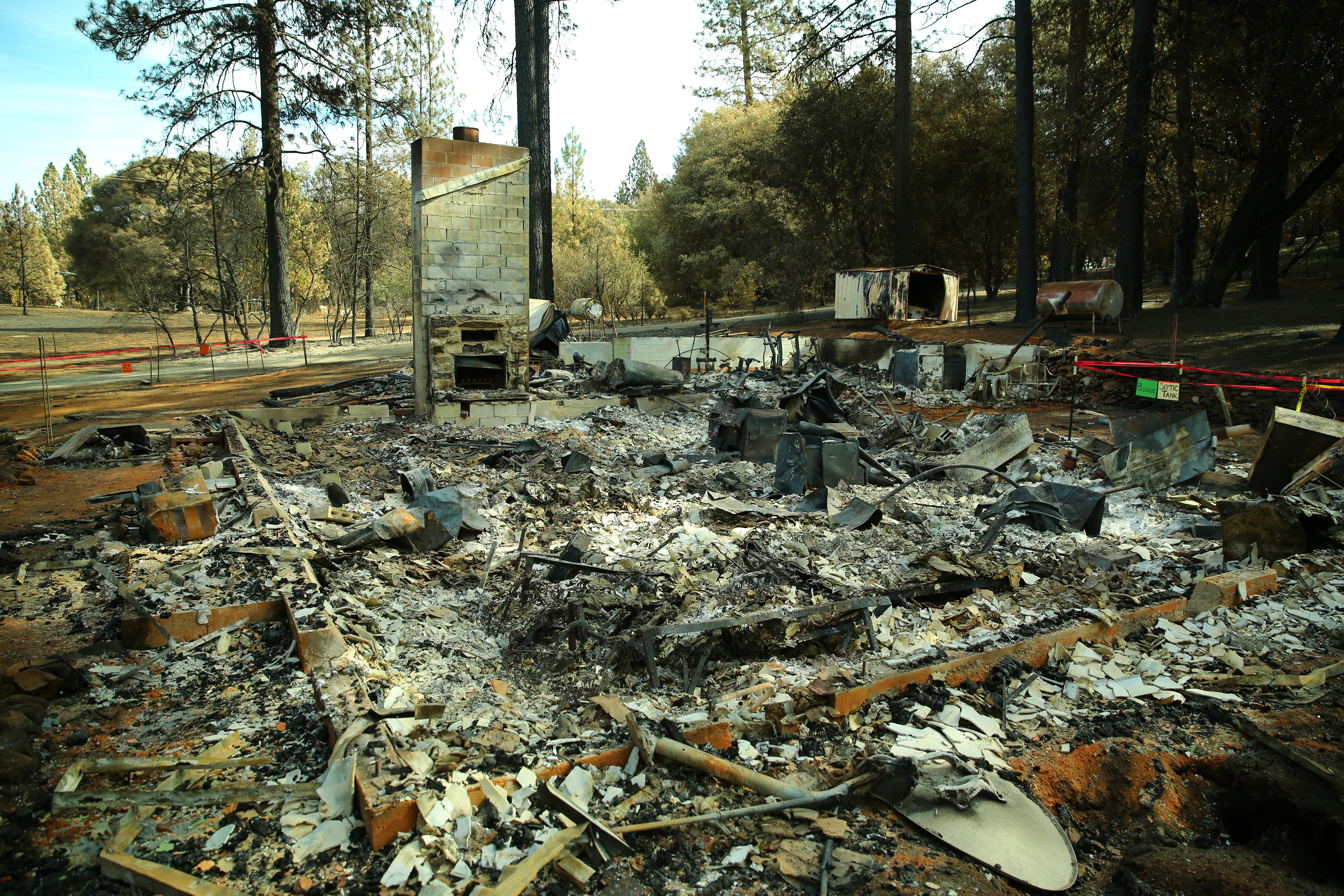
Building burned down by the Butte Fire

On June 22, 2017, Sacramento Judge Allen Sumner ruled that because "...the Butte Fire was caused by a public improvement as deliberately designed and constructed by Pacific Gas and Electric Company," the company is liable for all property damages caused by the fire.

On July 1, 2020, the PG&E Fire Victim Trust (FVT) was established as part of the reorganization plan of the 2019 bankruptcy of PG&E to administer the claims of the wildfire victims. Also on July 1, PG&E funded the Fire Victim Trust (FVT) with $5.4 billion in cash and 22.19% of stock in the reorganized PG&E, which covers most of the obligations of its settlement for the wildfire victims. PG&E has two more payments totaling $1.35 billion in cash, scheduled to be paid in January 2021 and January 2022, to complete its obligations to the wildfire victims.
