= Pheasant Creek (Santa Clara County) =

- Location of the mouth of Pheasant Creek

Location
- Country: United States
- State: California
- Region: Santa Clara County, California
- City: San Jose

Physical characteristics
- Source
  - location: North slope of ridge between Collards Peak and El Sombroso Mountain
  - coordinates: 37°11′38″N 122°55′37″W
  - elevation: 2,000 ft (610 m)
- Mouth: Guadalupe Creek
  - location: south San Jose, California
  - coordinates: 37°12′49.8″N 121°54′42.8″W
  - elevation: 371 ft (113 m)

Pheasant Creek is a perennial to intermittent 1.8 miles (2.9 km) north-by-northeast flowing stream in Santa Clara County, California, United States. It is a tributary to Guadalupe Creek, which is in turn, tributary to the Guadalupe River and south San Francisco Bay at San Jose, California.

== History ==
Pheasant Creek and the rest of the upper Guadalupe River watershed below the Guadalupe Reservoir and Dam were near the Guadalupe Mine, part of the New Almaden Mercury Mining District, established in 1845 in the hills south of San Jose, California, which hosted the first and most productive mercury mines in the state.

== Watershed ==
Pheasant Creek begins on the north slope of a ridge between Collords Peak and El Sombroso Mountain in the southern Santa Cruz Mountains. It flows north-by-northeast about 1.8 miles (2.9 km) before its confluence with Guadalupe Creek about 2.4 miles (3.9 km) below Guadalupe Reservoir and Dam. It is the second tributary to Guadalupe Creek below the dam, the first being Hicks Creek.

== Ecology ==
According to numerous reports, Pheasant Creek's lower reaches host spawning steelhead trout (Oncorhynchus mykiss). A 2014–2015 steelhead trout survey found "Guadalupe Creek above Hicks Road had the longest contiguous area of flowing freshwater" with appropriate conditions for residence of O. mykiss in the Guadalupe River watershed, with the highest catch rate near the mouth of Pheasant Creek.

The entire Pheasant Creek watershed is protected on Sierra Azul Open Space Preserve lands.

== See also ==
- Guadalupe Creek
- Guadalupe River
- Sierra Azul Open Space Preserve

== See also ==
- List of watercourses in the San Francisco Bay Area
