= Hicks Creek (Santa Clara County) =

Stream in Santa Clara County, California

Hicks Creek Reynolds Creek, Cherry Springs Creek
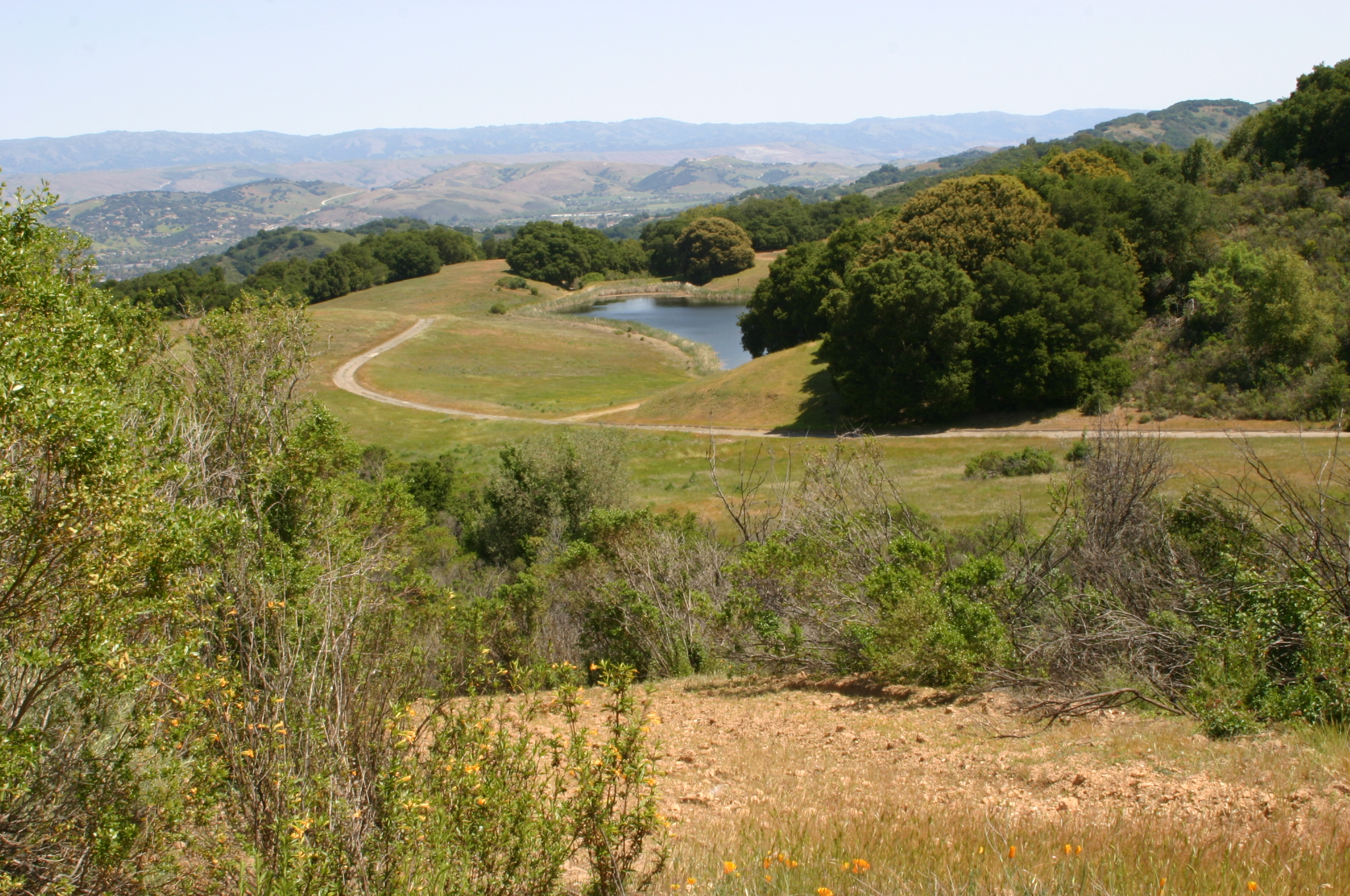
- View overlooking Cherry Springs Pond, the origin of Cherry Springs Creek, a tributary to Hicks Creek

- Location of the mouth of Hicks Creek

Location
- Country: United States
- State: California
- Region: Santa Clara County, California
- City: San Jose

Physical characteristics
- Source
  - location: Cherry Springs on the north slope of El Sombroso Mountain
  - coordinates: 37°11′19″N 121°54′50″W
  - elevation: 1,621 ft (494 m)
- Mouth: Guadalupe Creek
  - location: borders south San Jose, California
  - coordinates: 37°12′18.6″N 121°53′46.9″W
  - elevation: 439 ft (134 m)

Basin features
- Tributaries
  - left: Cherry Springs Creek

Hicks Creek, also known as Reynolds Creek, is a perennial 1.9 miles (3.1 km) northeast flowing stream in Santa Clara County, California, United States. It is a tributary to Guadalupe Creek, which is in turn, a tributary to the Guadalupe River and south San Francisco Bay at San Jose, California.

== History ==
Hicks Creek is named for Thomas Pascoe Brown Hicks, a native of Cornwall, England, United Kingdom, born in 1825, who immigrated to California in 1854. He was naturalized in Tuolumne County in 1862 and settled in Santa Clara County later that year. Hicks owned various lands about the Guadalupe Mine and operated a store there until his death in 1901. He paid for the survey of Hicks Road, which until 1956 ran from Camden Avenue to Alamitos Road.

Hicks Road runs along Guadalupe Creek, and Hicks Creek is the first significant tributary of Guadalupe Creek below Guadalupe Reservoir and Dam. This portion of the upper Guadalupe River watershed below the Dam was near the Guadalupe Mine, part of the New Almaden Mercury Mining District, established in 1845 in the hills south of San Jose, California, which hosted the first and most productive mercury mines in the state. Hicks Flat, at the confluence of Hicks Creek with Guadalupe Creek, is the location of a recent mercury mine-waste clean-up.

Hicks Creek is also known as Reynolds Creek, and the creek is just west of Reynolds Road which intersects with Hicks Road. Reynolds Creek is likely named for Judge John Reynolds, who was born in Bedford, Westchester County, New York in 1825, came to California in 1853 and practiced in San Francisco until 1871 when he moved his law practice to Santa Clara County. He became a judge of the Santa Clara County Superior Court and was elected to the California State Assembly in 1880. In a record of Santa Clara County court cases, there was a land ownership title dispute between T. P. B. Hicks, his brother William John Hicks, and John Reynolds, which are likely the persons mentioned above given the proximity of the roads and creeks named for them.

== Watershed ==
Hicks Creek begins on the north slope of El Sombroso in the southern Santa Cruz Mountains, about 2 miles (3.2 km) north-northwest of Mt. Umunhum. The southern Santa Cruz Mountains were originally named by the Spanish as the Sierra Azul or "Blue Mountains", which is the namesake for the Sierra Azul Open Space District. Hicks Creek flows north-by-northeast about 1.9 miles (3.1 km) before its confluence with Guadalupe Creek about 1.0 mile (1.6 km) below Guadalupe Reservoir. Hicks Creek's confluence with Guadalupe Creek is just west of the intersection of Reynolds Road with Hicks Road.

Cherry Springs Creek is a short, perennial tributary of Hicks Creek with its origin in man-made Cherry Springs Pond. It flows northeast 0.67 miles (1.08 km) through a natural channel to its mouth at Hicks Creek.

Hicks Creek is defined on the Santa Clara Valley Water District Santa Clara County Creeks Map and the Oakland Museum of California Creek & Watershed Map of South San Jose. Cherry Springs Creek and Hicks Creek are reversed on a 2005 Guadalupe River Watershed mercury total maximum daily load (TMDL) report and a 2011 geologic map of a mercury mine waste inventory report.

== Ecology ==
According to numerous reports, Hicks Creek's lower reaches host spawning steelhead trout (Oncorhynchus mykiss) "in almost every pool and riffle". A 2014–2015 steelhead trout survey found "Guadalupe Creek above Hicks Road had the longest contiguous area of flowing freshwater" with appropriate conditions for residence of O. mykiss in the Guadalupe River watershed.

The entire Hicks Creek watershed is protected on the Sierra Azul Open Space Preserve lands.

== See also ==
- Guadalupe Creek
- Guadalupe River
- Oakland Museum of California

== See also ==
- List of watercourses in the San Francisco Bay Area
