= Sierra Azul Open Space Preserve =

Nature reserve in California

Coordinates: 37°10′07″N 121°15′42″W

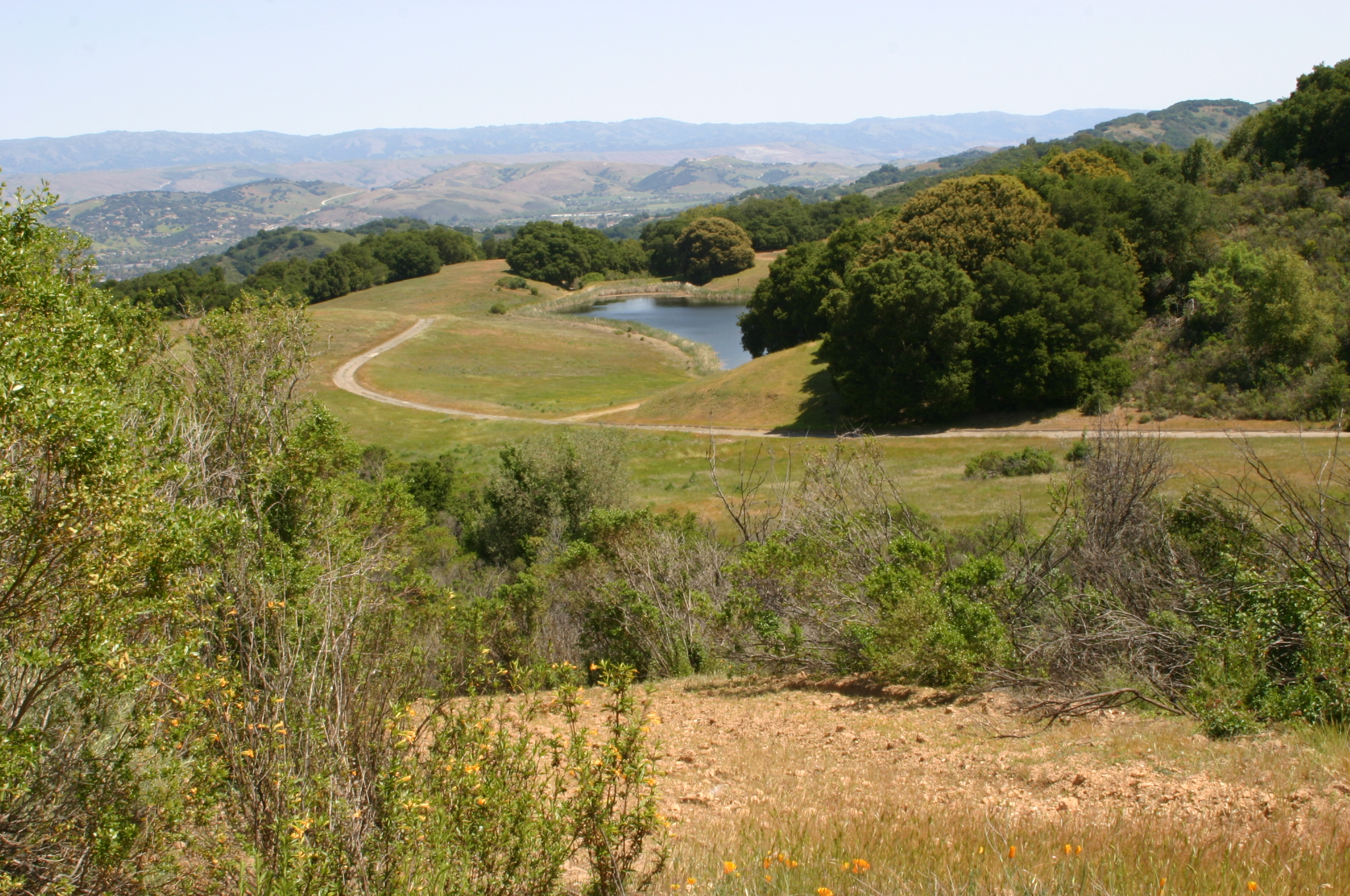
View overlooking Cherry Springs Pond, the origin of Cherry Springs Creek, a tributary to Hicks Creek, and thence to Guadalupe Creek

Sierra Azul Open Space Preserve is managed by the Midpeninsula Regional Open Space District in Santa Clara County, California. It is approximately 19,300 acres (7,800 ha) in area. The preserve is named for the Sierra Azul or "Blue Mountains", the name the colonizing Spanish used for the half of the Santa Cruz Mountains south of today's California Highway 17.

The park features the peaks of Mount Umunhum 3,486 feet (1,063 m), Mount Thayer 3,478 feet (1,060 m), and El Sombroso peak 2,999 feet (914 m). El Sombroso is about 2 miles (3.2 km) north by northeast of Mount Umunhum. Trails connect from Lexington Reservoir, on the western edge of the park, to Hicks Road on the eastern edge.

The preserve protects the upper watersheds of two important tributaries of the Guadalupe River. The upper headwaters of Los Gatos Creek originate just south of Loma Prieta, wrapping around the preserve on the western side before emptying into Lexington Reservoir. Guadalupe Creek originates just east of Mount Umunhum and flows into Guadalupe Reservoir then follows Hicks Road as it wraps around the eastern side of the preserve.

Parts of Sierra Azul Open Space Preserve are not yet open to the public, but many sections are, and these include miles of trails, old roads (some paved, some not), a man-made lake, and other amenities. The terrain varies from wooded creek canyons to chaparral hills with views to open meadows.
