= Canoas Creek =

Canoas Creek is the name of several streams:

== Rivers ==
California

- Canoas Creek (Fresno County), a stream in Fresno County, California
- Canoas Creek (Santa Clara County), a tributary of the Guadalupe River in Santa Clara County, California
