= Crystal Peak (Santa Clara County, California) =

Mountain in Santa Clara County, California, United States

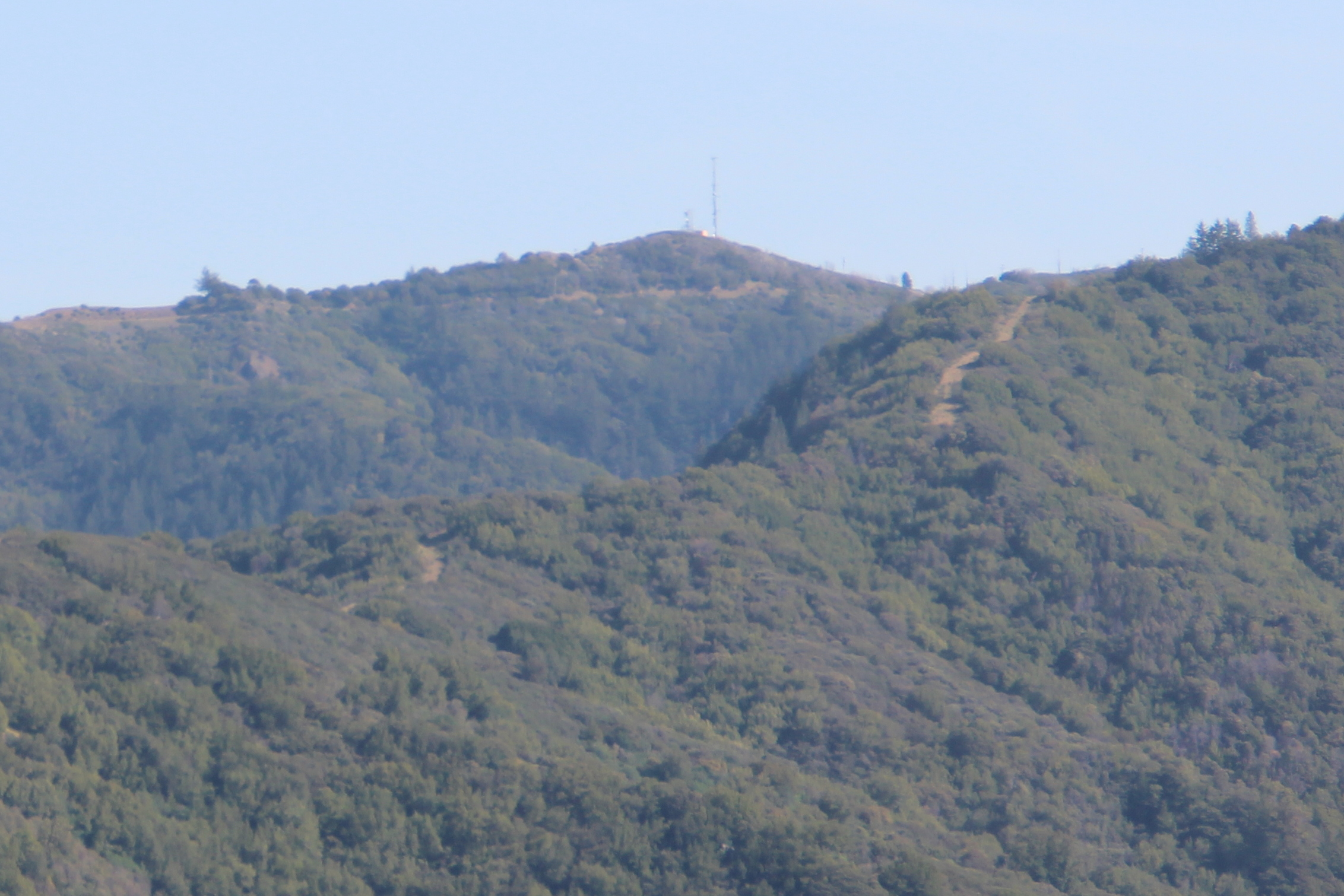
- Crystal Peak seen from the Sierra Azul Open Space Preserve

Highest point
- Elevation: 3,592 ft (1,095 m) NGVD 29
- Coordinates: 37°06′48″N 121°50′09″W

Geography
- Location within California Location within the United States
- Location: Santa Clara County, California, United States
- Parent range: Santa Cruz Mountains
- Topo map: USGS Loma Prieta

Crystal Peak is a prominent peak in the Santa Cruz Mountains in southwest Santa Clara County, California, United States. The landmark lies 10 mi (16 km) west of Morgan Hill, and approximately 0.5 mi (1 km) northeast of Loma Prieta. It is the second highest peak in the Santa Cruz Mountains. The headwaters of Llagas Creek originate on the eastern flank of the peak, and flow southward before merging with the Pajaro River at the San Benito County line.

== History ==
The summit was named for the radio communications facility on the peak and to commemorate early crystal radio development.

== See also ==
- List of summits of the San Francisco Bay Area
