= Pheasant Creek (disambiguation) =

Pheasant Creek may refer to

== Streams ==
- Pheasant Creek, a creek in Saskatchewan, Canada
- Pheasant Creek (Santa Clara County), a tributary of Guadalupe Creek in California, United States
- Pheasant Creek (Fisher River tributary), a tributary of the Fisher River in North Carolina, United States

== Municipalities ==
- Pheasant Creek, Queensland, a rural locality in the Shire of Banana, Queensland, Australia
- Pheasant Creek, Victoria, a locality in Victoria, Australia
