= Mount Thayer =

Mountain in California, US

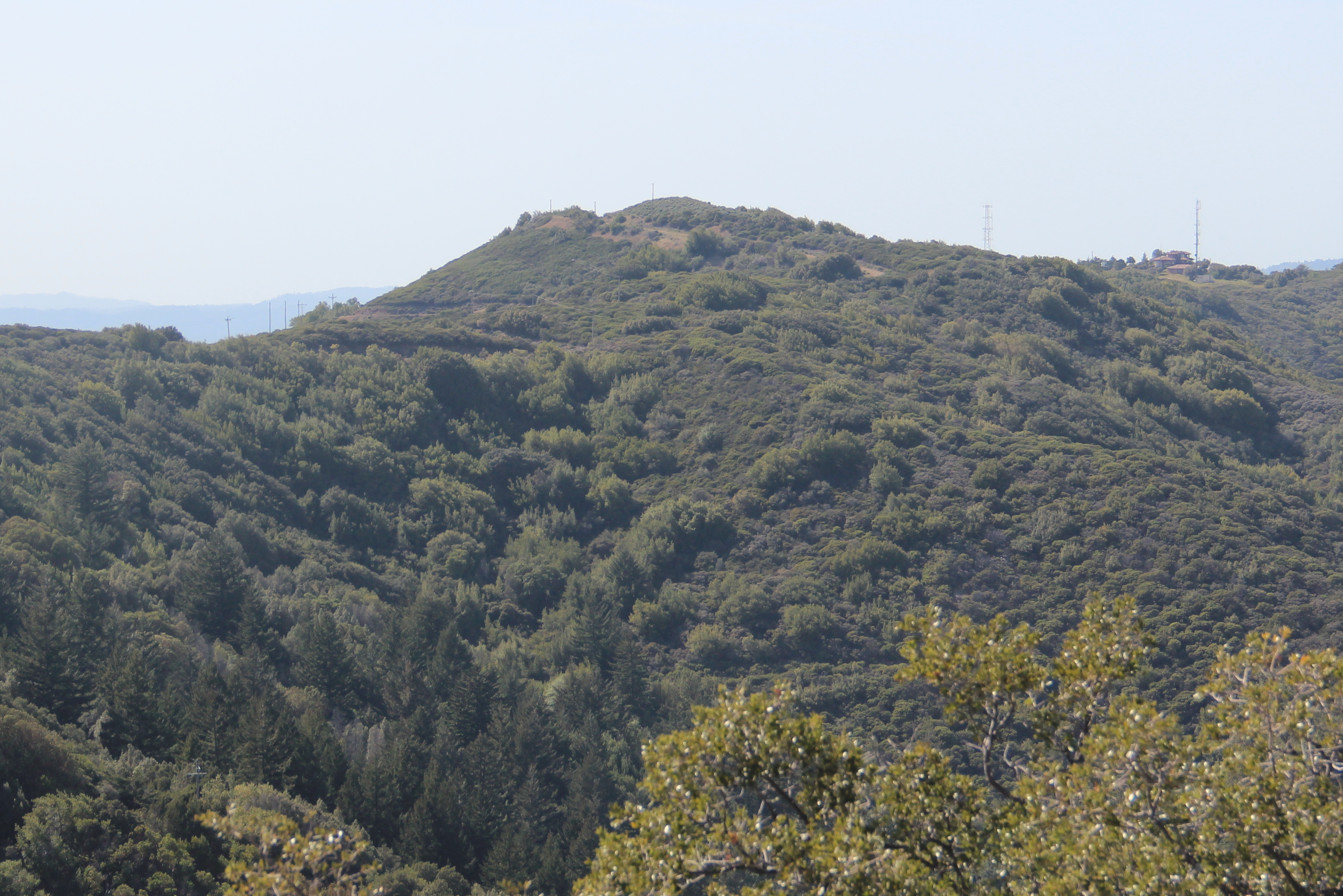
- Mount Thayer seen from Mount Umunhum

Highest point
- Elevation: 3,502 ft (1,067 m) NAVD 88
- Prominence: 303 ft (92 m)
- Coordinates: 37°09′50″N 121°55′07″W

Geography
- Location within California
- Location: Santa Clara County, California, U.S.
- Parent range: Santa Cruz Mountains
- Topo map: USGS Los Gatos

Climbing
- Easiest route: Mt. Umunhum Road

Mount Thayer is a mountain in the Santa Cruz mountain range located in Santa Clara County, California. The summit is in a section of the abandoned Almaden Air Force Station, 1.5 miles northwest of Mount Umunhum. The elevation of the summit is at 3,502 feet (1,067 m) feet. An old derelict building, surrounded by telephone poles, is located on the summit. Mount Thayer, along with the surrounding property, is off limits to the public.

== See also ==
- List of summits of the San Francisco Bay Area
