= Guadalupe River (California) =

River in Santa Clara County, California, United States

Guadalupe River Río de Nuestra Señora de Guadalupe Río de San José
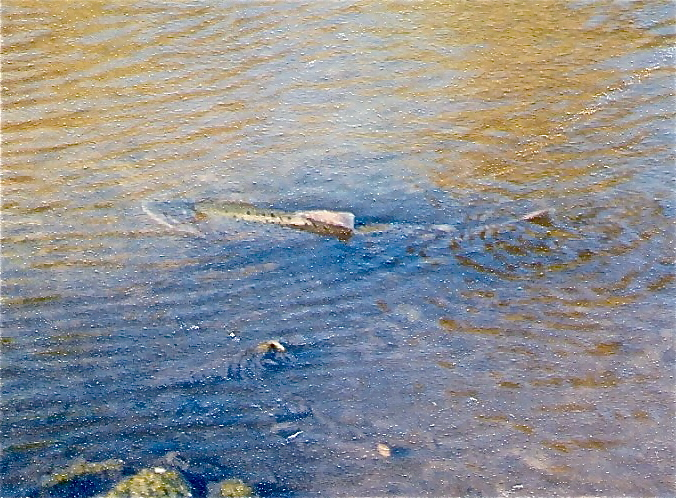
- Chinook salmon spawning on the Los Gatos Creek tributary of Guadalupe River by California Highway 17 in 1996

- Location of the mouth of Guadalupe River in California
- Etymology: Spanish language
- Native name: Thámien Rúmmey (Northern Ohlone)

Location
- Country: United States
- State: California
- Region: Santa Clara County
- City: San Jose, California

Physical characteristics
- Source: Lake Almaden, at confluence of Los Alamitos Creek and Guadalupe Creek
  - location: San Jose, California
  - coordinates: 37°14′37.7″N 121°52′22.7″W
  - elevation: 194 ft (59 m)
- Mouth: Alviso Slough, San Francisco Bay
  - location: Alviso, San Jose, California
  - coordinates: 37°25′32.5″N 121°58′45″W
  - elevation: 0 ft (0 m)

Basin features
- Tributaries
  - left: Guadalupe Creek, Ross Creek, Los Gatos Creek
  - right: Los Alamitos Creek, Canoas Creek

The Guadalupe River (Spanish: Río Guadalupe; Muwekma Ohlone:Thámien Rúmmey) mainstem is an urban, north-by-northwestward flowing 14 miles (23 km) river in California whose much longer headwater creeks originate in the Santa Cruz Mountains. The river mainstem now begins on the Santa Clara Valley floor when Los Alamitos Creek exits Lake Almaden and joins Guadalupe Creek just downstream of Coleman Road in San Jose, California. From here it flows north through San Jose, where it receives Los Gatos Creek, a major tributary. The Guadalupe River serves as the eastern boundary of the City of Santa Clara and the western boundary of Alviso, and after coursing through San José, it empties into south San Francisco Bay at the Alviso Slough.

Much of the river is surrounded by parks. The river's Los Alamitos and Guadalupe Creek tributaries are, in turn, fed by smaller streams flowing from Almaden Quicksilver County Park, home to former mercury mines dating back to when the area was governed by Mexico. The Guadalupe watershed carries precipitation from the slopes of Loma Prieta and Mount Umunhum, the two major peaks of the Sierra Azul, the historical Spanish name ("Blue Mountains") for that half of the Santa Cruz Mountains south of California Highway 17. Two of the Guadalupe River's major tributaries, Los Gatos Creek and Guadalupe Creek have their sources in the Sierra Azul Open Space Preserve on the western and eastern flanks of the Sierra Azul.

== History ==
The Guadalupe River was named by the Juan Bautista de Anza Expedition on March 30, 1776, Río de Nuestra Señora de Guadalupe, in honor of the Virgin of Guadalupe, the principal patron saint of the expedition. Specifically, Juan Bautista de Anza camped along the banks of the Guadalupe River at Expedition Camp 97 on March 30, 1776, near the present-day site of Agnews State Hospital (Santa Clara County, 2001). The historic de Anza Expedition explored much of Santa Clara County, traversing western areas en route from Monterey to San Francisco, and traveling around the south end of San Francisco Bay and thence through the eastern portions of the county on the return trip after exploration of parts of the East Bay.

In 1777, the original Mission Santa Clara de Thamien and el Pueblo de San José de Guadalupe were established on the banks of Mission Creek, un tiro de escopeta (a musket shot away) from its confluence with the Guadalupe River. Both had to be moved away from the river because of mosquitoes in the summertime and flooding during the winter. Today Santa Clara Mission is 2 miles (3.2 km) away from the original location.

Historically the Guadalupe River was even shorter, originating several miles further north, at the downstream end of a large willow swamp that is now Willow Glen. Its main tributary was known as Arroyo Seco de Guadalupe on 1860 maps and then as Arroyo Seco de Los Capitancillos on the 1876 Thompson & West maps.

On July 9, 2005, the fossilized bones of a juvenile Columbian mammoth were discovered by San Jose resident Roger Castillo in the Lower Guadalupe River near the Trimble Road overcrossing. Roger founded the Salmon and Steelhead Restoration Group conservation organization and has served as a board member of the Guadalupe–Coyote Resource Conservation District. The Pleistocene mammoth was nicknamed "Lupe" by area residents and Lupe's fossils are exhibited at Children's Discovery Museum of San Jose.

== Guadalupe watershed ==
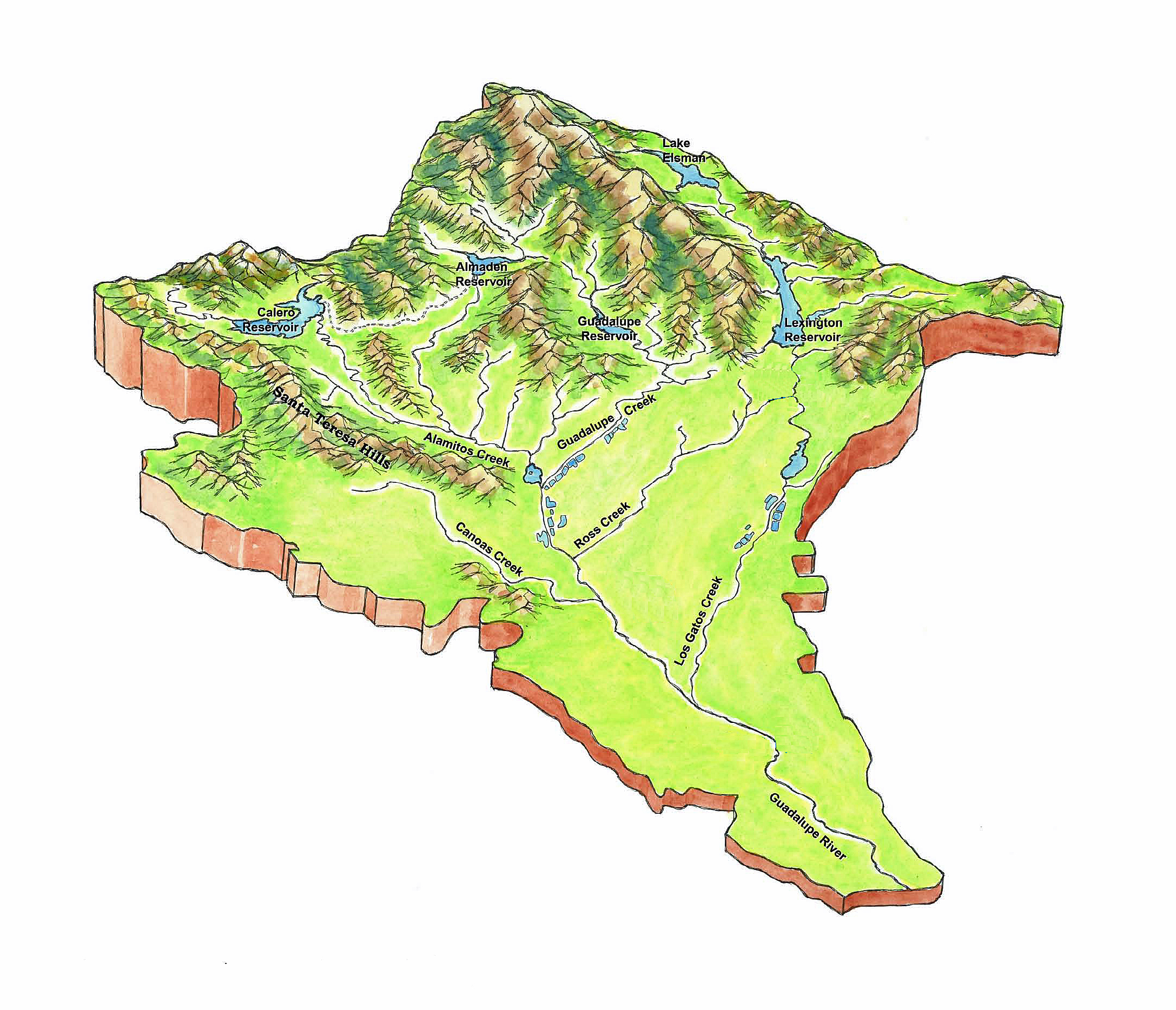
Tributary creeks of the Guadalupe watershed 3D Topo Map

Historically, the Guadalupe River flowed into Guadalupe Slough, 1.0 mile (1.6 km) west of its current drainage into Alviso Slough. To make it easier to get sailboats up the Guadalupe River to the port of Alviso, the river was redirected into the straighter Alviso Slough by the 1870s. Alviso Slough, also known as Steamboat Slough historically, was relatively straight, while Guadalupe Slough meandered extensively through the marshes. Alviso Slough was historically not fed by any upland streams, but simply carried tidewater in and out of the extensive salt marshes.

The re-routing of the river to Alviso Slough in the 1870s also disconnected it from several tributaries, and had the effect of shrinking the Guadalupe watershed. San Tomas Aquino Creek (current) and its Saratoga Creek tributary (previously known as San Jon Creek and Campbell Creek) and Calabazas Creek (historic), used to enter the Guadalupe River upstream of Alviso. These tributaries were disconnected from the river and re-routed directly into Guadalupe Slough between 1876 and 1890 according to historic maps. Reportedly, Saratoga Creek (Campbell Creek) had steelhead and coho salmon runs. Large portions of the tributaries of the river were straightened and armored starting in the late 19th century and continuing through the 20th century first by farmers and then by the Santa Clara Valley Water District (SCVWD) and its predecessor organizations. They now go dry in the summer months and their lower segments have become denuded ditches requiring continuous maintenance. Mission Creek used to harbor trout and salmon but today it is buried in a culvert. The historic watershed can be viewed in the Thompson and West 1876 maps.

The Guadalupe River watershed today drains an area of 172 square miles (450 km^{2}). Below its origination at the confluence of Guadalupe Creek and Los Alamitos Creek, the mainstem is joined by three other tributaries: Ross, Canoas, and Los Gatos Creeks. The SCVWD manages water flows (supply) and provides flood control on the river, and recently has started to promote watershed stewardship. Six major reservoirs exist in the watershed: Calero Reservoir on Calero Creek, Guadalupe Reservoir on Guadalupe Creek, Almaden Reservoir on Alamitos Creek, Vasona Reservoir, Lexington Reservoir, and Lake Elsman on Los Gatos Creek.

=== Restoration of the river mouth ===
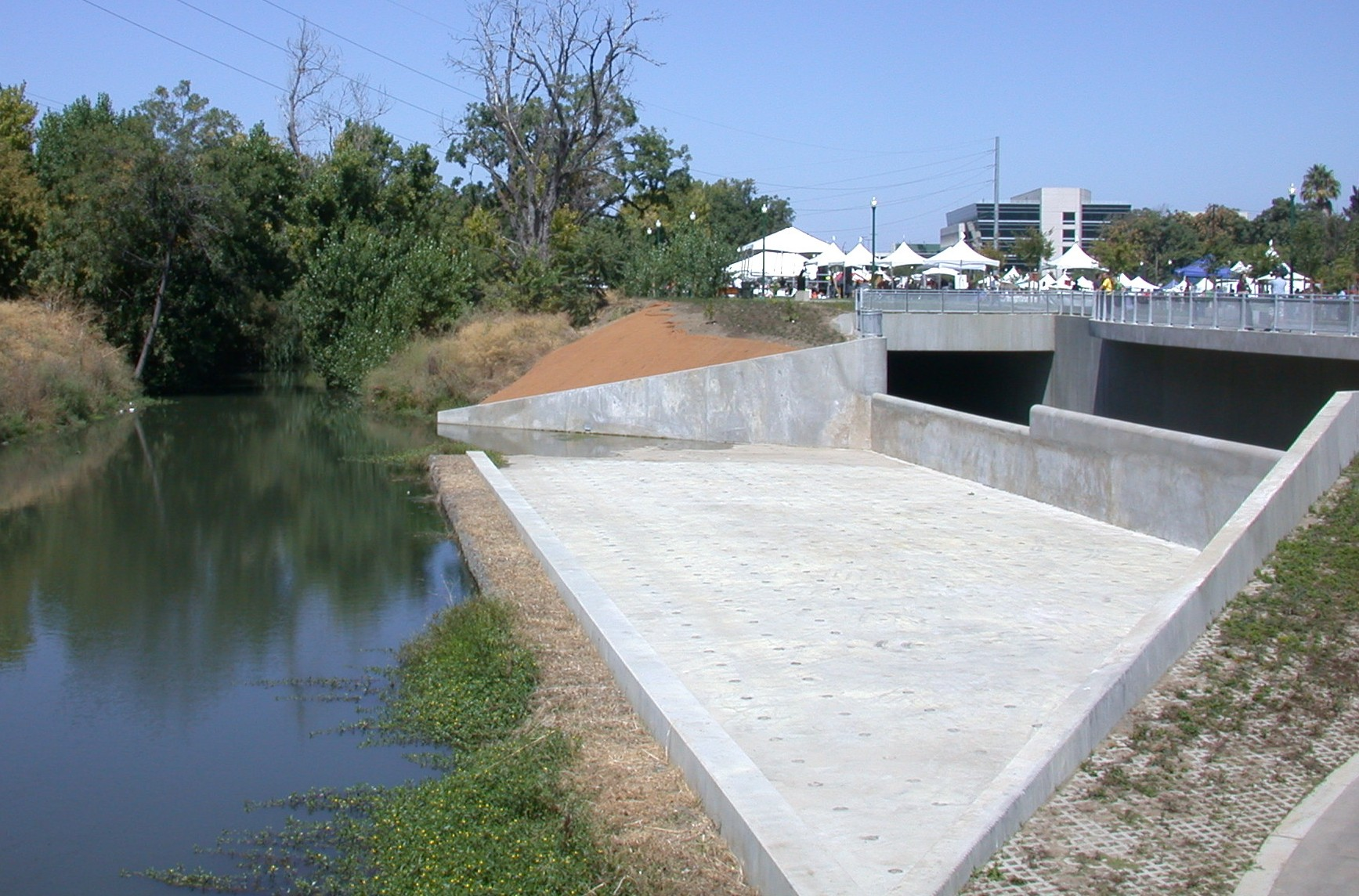
Opening day festivities at the Guadalupe River Park and Gardens

Ending nine years of study and passionate debate about the future of the San Jose/Alviso waterfront, the Santa Clara Valley Water District in November, 2009 voted to approve a $6 million project to clear bulrushes, tule reeds and thick sediment from the Guadalupe River in Alviso. The construction of salt evaporation ponds in the 1930s had rerouted the river, cutting off tidal action. Later, in the 1960s, as Alviso was being annexed into San Jose, the Army Corps of Engineers and the water district straightened the river to improve flood safety, which inadvertently increased sedimentation into Alviso Slough. The current project will open a former Cargill salt pond (known as A8) as the beginning of the South Bay Salt Pond Restoration Project, considered the largest tidal wetland restoration project on the West Coast. When complete, the project should restore 15,100 acres (61 km^{2}) of industrial salt ponds to tidal wetlands. Pond A8 will be the first one worked on.

== Habitat and wildlife ==
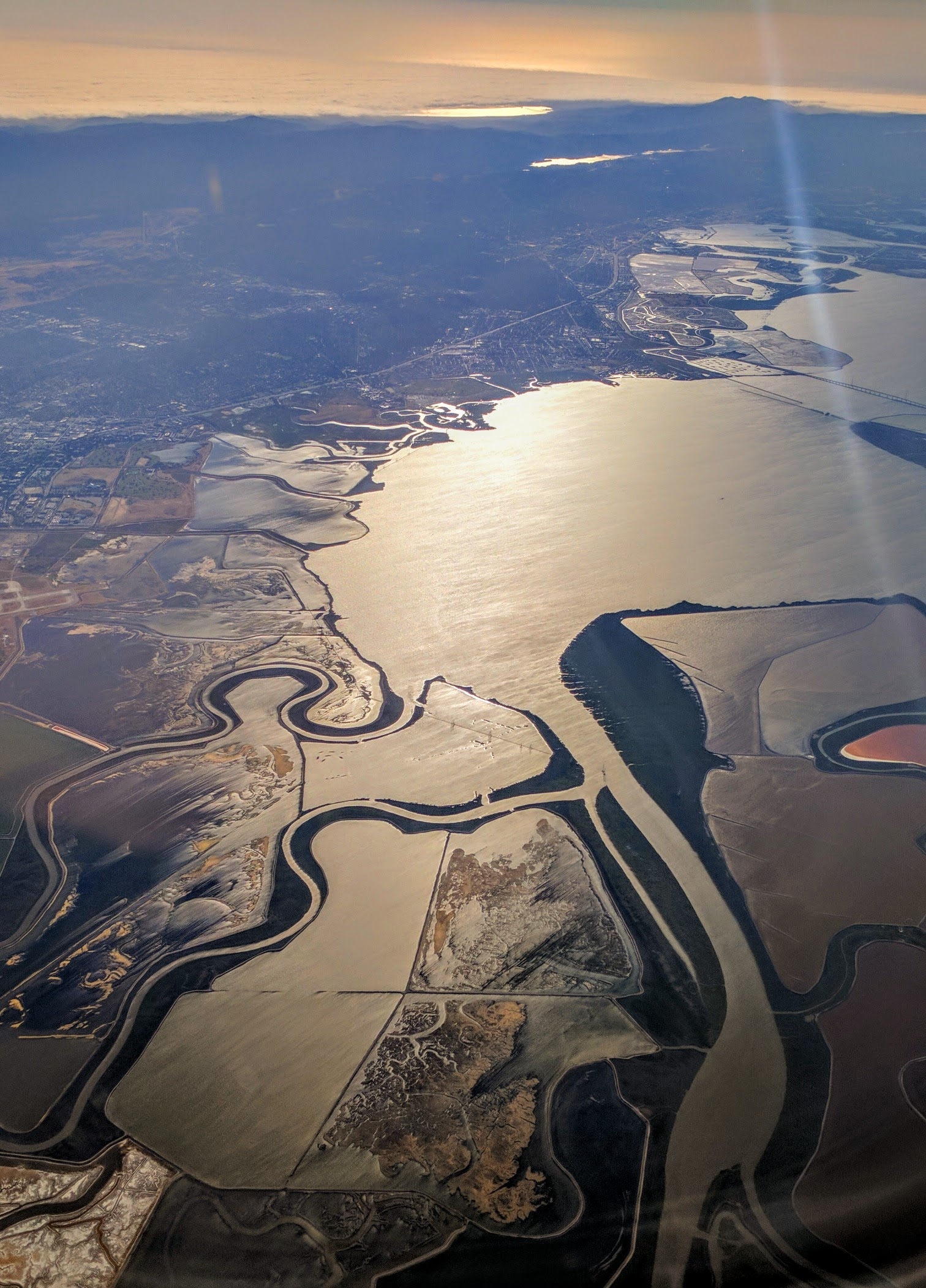
Coyote Creek (lower right) where it flows into the south San Francisco Bay, with the Guadalupe River joining it via the Alviso Slough, and the Guadalupe Slough entering just to the west (left). The ponds between the meandering sloughs, on the left, are salt ponds A5 through A8; in the lower center, bounded by the Alviso Slough and Coyote Creek, A9 through A15.

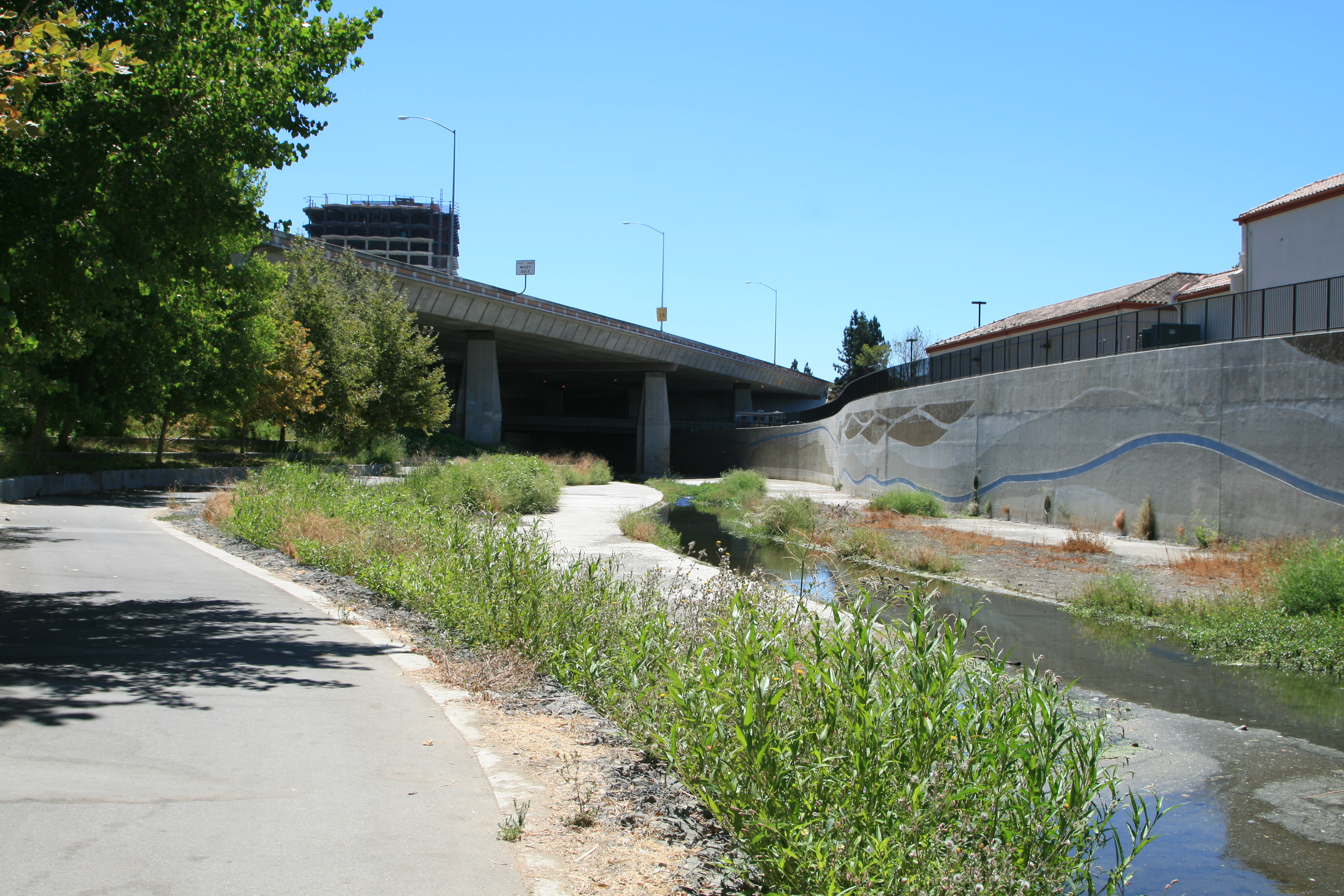
Urban Guadalupe River lies in heavily armored concrete channel

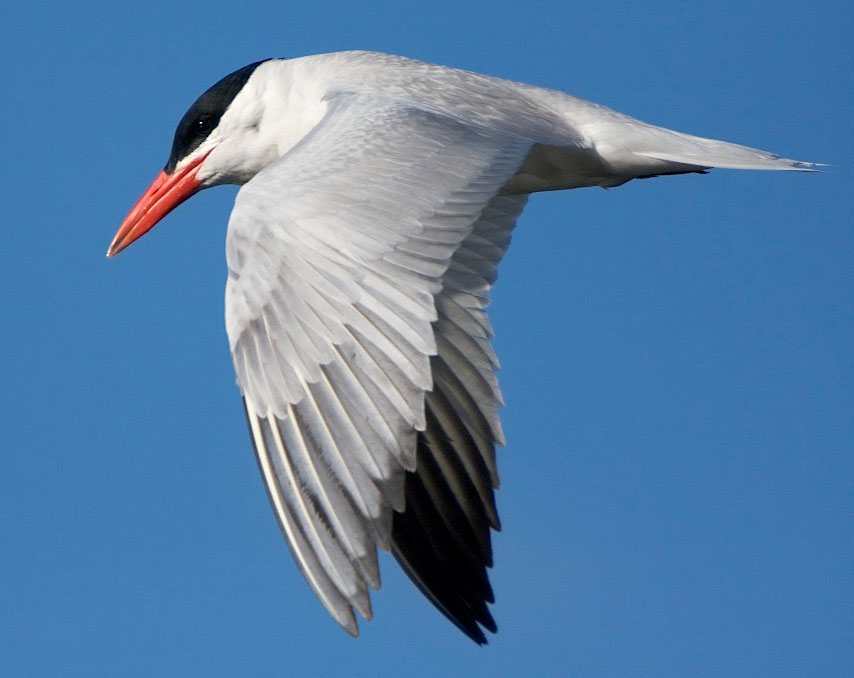
Caspian tern at Guadalupe watershed

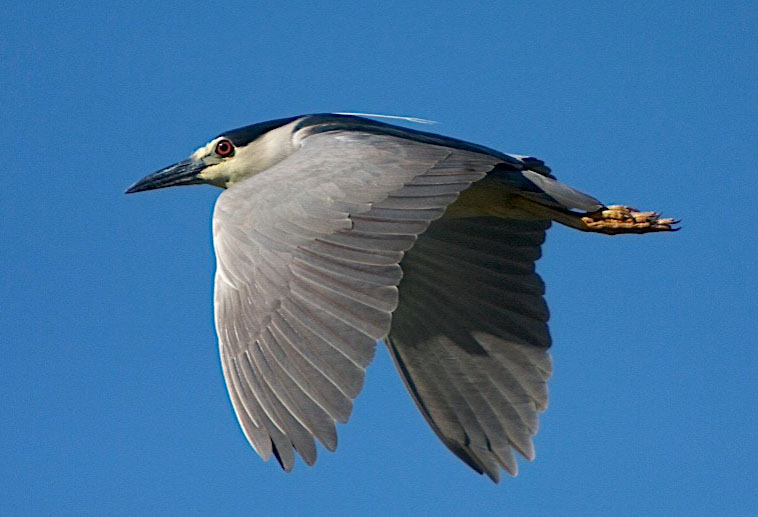
Black-crowned night heron at Guadalupe watershed

A 2021 ancient DNA sequencing study of salmonid remains excavated from Mission Santa Clara dating to 1781–1834 CE found that of 58 salmonid vertebrae bones analyzed, three samples had DNA sequences indicating Chinook salmon (Oncorhynchus tshawytscha), the other 55 were steelhead trout (Oncorhynchus mykiss). This study provided definitive evidence that Chinook salmon were present historically in the Guadalupe River circa 1800 as large fish like Chinook salmon were traded by the tribes as dried filets or fish powder without bones, and is consistent with physical evidence that Chinook salmon were present historically in at least three other San Francisco Bay tributaries: Walnut Creek, Alameda Creek, and San Leandro Creek. The ancient DNA study is also consistent with a 1904 San Jose newspaper account of steelhead and salmon catches in the city. Three genetic analyses of Chinook salmon in the Guadalupe River found that most are related to fall-run Central Valley stock and likely hatchery-origin but two of the studies also found some were coastal Chinook salmon from the Russian River and Columbia River, respectively. Chinook salmon are adept at colonizing neighboring and even distant streams and rivers, as evidenced by the recent finding of juvenile Chinook salmon from the Klamath River in the Napa River, and hatchery fish are known to stray at higher rates than naturally spawned fish. In 2012, the Santa Clara Valley Habitat Plan reported that Chinook salmon currently spawn in the Guadalupe River and its tributaries, as well as Coyote Creek. Because Chinook spawn in early winter and juveniles may migrate to the ocean in their first spring, Chinook are able to use habitats that turn very warm or have low water quality in summer.

On the Los Gatos Creek tributary a population of California Golden beavers (Castor canadensis subauratus) has been re-established between Lake Elsman and Lexington Reservoir. The beaver were re-introduced to the portion of Los Gatos Creek where it enters Lexington Reservoir sometime prior to 1997, and recently, a beaver reportedly served as "a hearty meal" for a local mountain lion. Video documentary by Greg Kerekes documented beaver in the Guadalupe River mainstem in downtown San Jose in April, 2013. These are the first beaver recorded in the Santa Clara Valley since zoologist James Graham Cooper captured one in Santa Clara for the Smithsonian Institution on Dec. 31, 1855. Historical evidence of beaver in the area includes reference by Captain John Sutter who around 1840 recorded that 1,500 beaver pelts were sold "at a trifling value" by the Indians to Mission San José. In 1840, from the port of Alviso, California, beaver pelts, cattle hides and tallow were shipped to San Francisco. In addition, in 1828 fur trapper Michel La Framboise travelled from the Bonaventura River to San Francisco and then the missions of San José, San Francisco Solano and San Rafael Arcángel. La Framboise stated that "the Bay of San Francisco abounds in beaver", and that he "made his best hunt in the vicinity of the missions". Golden beaver were apparently wiped out by trappers in the Bay Area sometime after the end of the California Fur Rush.

Caspian terns (Hydroprogne caspia), North America's largest tern, return to the Bay every spring to nest, migrating from as far away as Colombia. According to scientists from the U.S. Geological Survey, Caspian tern populations in the South Bay are declining at the same time that high levels of mercury are being found in their eggs. The highest mercury levels found in animals from the Bay were in the eggs of Caspian and Forster's (Sterna forsteri) terns that nest near the Cargill salt ponds at the mouth of the Guadalupe River. A study conducted by the U.S. Fish and Wildlife Service has found that nearly three-quarters of the eggs examined from black-crowned night heron (Nycticorax nycticorax) nests in the Guadalupe watershed contained mercury exceeding thresholds known to kill the embryos of other bird species.

=== Flooding ===
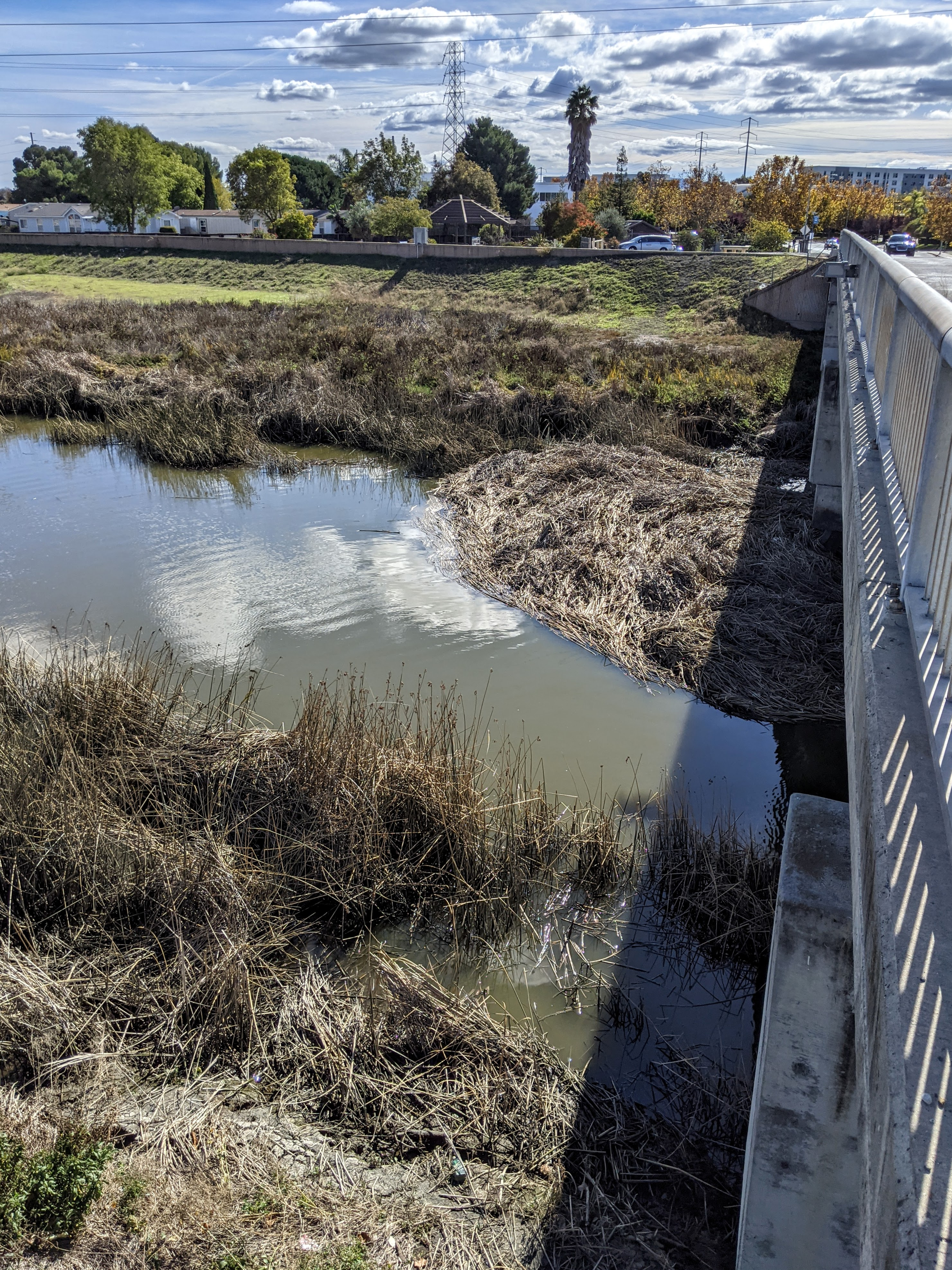
A "strainer" (a dam-like accumulation of debris) on the Guadalupe River at Alviso; such accumulations can slow the flow and contribute to upstream flooding.

The river occasionally floods in downtown San Jose, south of downtown, as well as in Alviso. Flooding prompted President Clinton to declare a National Disaster Area in 1995 and 1997. In March 1995, flooding of this river around the San Jose Arena caused the cancellation of a San Jose Sharks game, the only rainout in the history of the National Hockey League. This flood, like most Guadalupe River floods, was triggered by undersized bridges, in this case, the Julian Street Bridge.

The river has flooded 15 times since World War II. In response to this flooding, the Santa Clara Valley Water District (SCVWD) launched a series of flood protection projects along the Guadalupe River to ensure that residential and commercial areas near the river are protected from 100-year floods. A major component of the flood control project, designed to control a 100-year flood along the Lower Guadalupe, was completed in late 2008. The greatest Guadalupe River flood on record occurred in 1955 and was part of the legendary "Christmas Week Floods" when the Guadalupe River flooded 8,300 acres (34 km^{2}).

=== Drought ===
After four years of the harsh California drought, in July 2015, the river ran dry for an 8-mile stretch through the city of San Jose. This was due to inadequate storage in upstream reservoirs for the releases of water needed to sustain flow to the river mouth until winter rains returned.

=== Mercury contamination ===
The Guadalupe watershed was an area of intense activity during the California Gold Rush, with the quicksilver mines within Santa Clara County supporting the gold refinement process. Thus, mercury toxicity and its effects on surrounding humans and wildlife is a major concern for the area. Because mercury is an effective magnet for gold, miners during the Gold Rush would regularly line their sluices with mercury to amalgamate the gold. An estimated 6,500 tons of mercury was lost in the system of creeks and rivers along the coast between 1850 and 1920, and is currently being detected today in the local streams, animal life, and riverbeds of these affected tributaries. Mercury loads are mobilized during large storm events. An evaluation of mercury loads during the large January 2017 rainstorms was similar to data gathered during a similar storm in 2002. Animals at the top of the food chain that consume fish contaminated with mercury are the most vulnerable, including predatory fish, birds, mammals, and humans that consume fish due to a process called biomagnification.

== Recreation ==
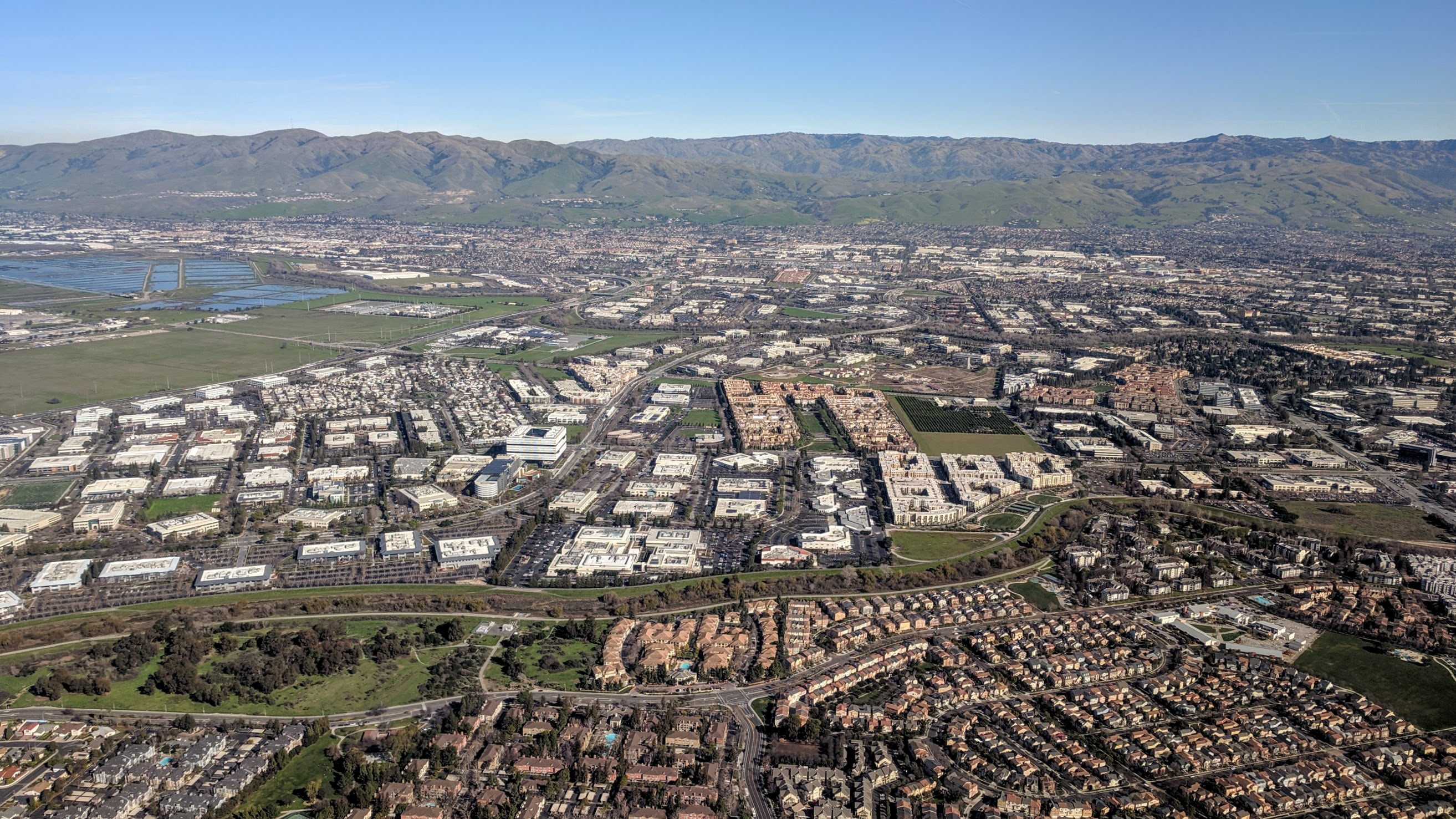
Aerial view of the Guadalupe River and Tasman Drive, with Guadalupe River Trail on far (east) side in San Jose and Ulistac Natural Area on near side in Santa Clara

The Guadalupe River Trail runs along 11 miles (18 km) of the river bank.

== See also ==
- List of rivers of California
- List of watercourses in the San Francisco Bay Area
