= Sierra Azul =

Mountain range in the state of California, United States

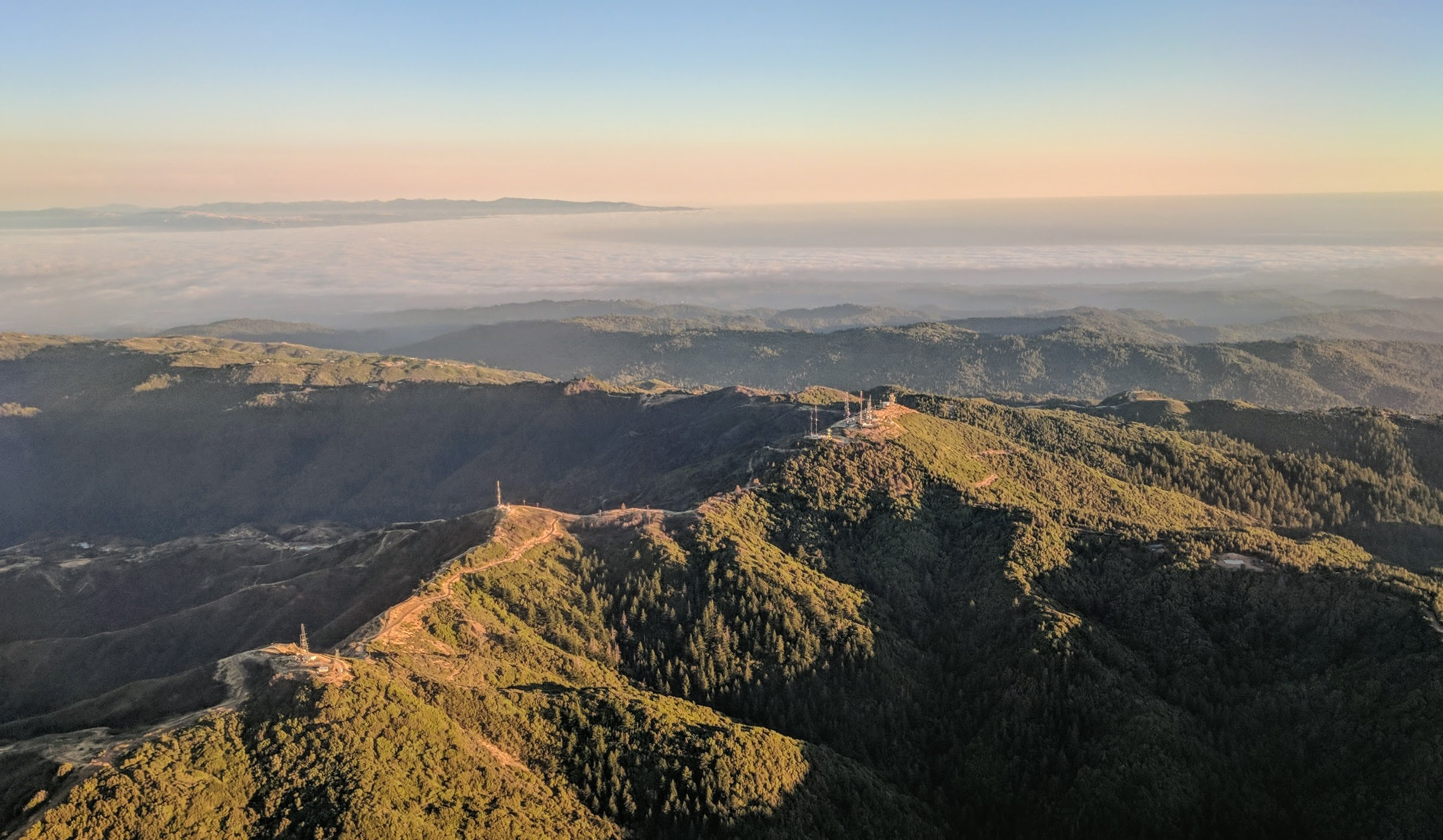
- Loma Prieta is the highest peak in the Sierra Azul Range

Highest point
- Peak: Loma Prieta
- Elevation: 3,790 ft (1,160 m)

Geography
- Location within California
- Country: United States
- State: California
- District: Santa Clara County
- Range coordinates: 37°10′6.804″N 121°54′41.841″W
- Parent range: Santa Cruz Mountains
- Topo map: USGS Los Gatos

The Sierra Azul is a mountain range in Santa Clara County, California. It is the southern half of the Santa Cruz Mountains range, which is divided into two parts by California State Route 17 into what the colonizing Spanish called the Sierra Morena or "Brown Mountains" to the north and the Sierra Azul or "Blue Mountains" to the south. Part of the range includes the Sierra Azul Open Space Preserve.

The highest peak is Loma Prieta at 3,790 feet (1,160m), and is prominently visible from around the Monterey Bay area. During the winter, snow can sometimes accumulate on the summit. The peak is near the epicenter of the 1989 Loma Prieta earthquake.

Another prominent peak is Mount Umunhum, the site of the former Almaden Air Force Station radar site and the current location of a NEXRAD weather radar of the National Weather Service which serves the San Francisco Bay Area and Monterey Bay Area.
