= Guadalupe Creek (Santa Clara County) =

Stream in Santa Clara County, California

Guadalupe Creek Los Capitancillos Creek
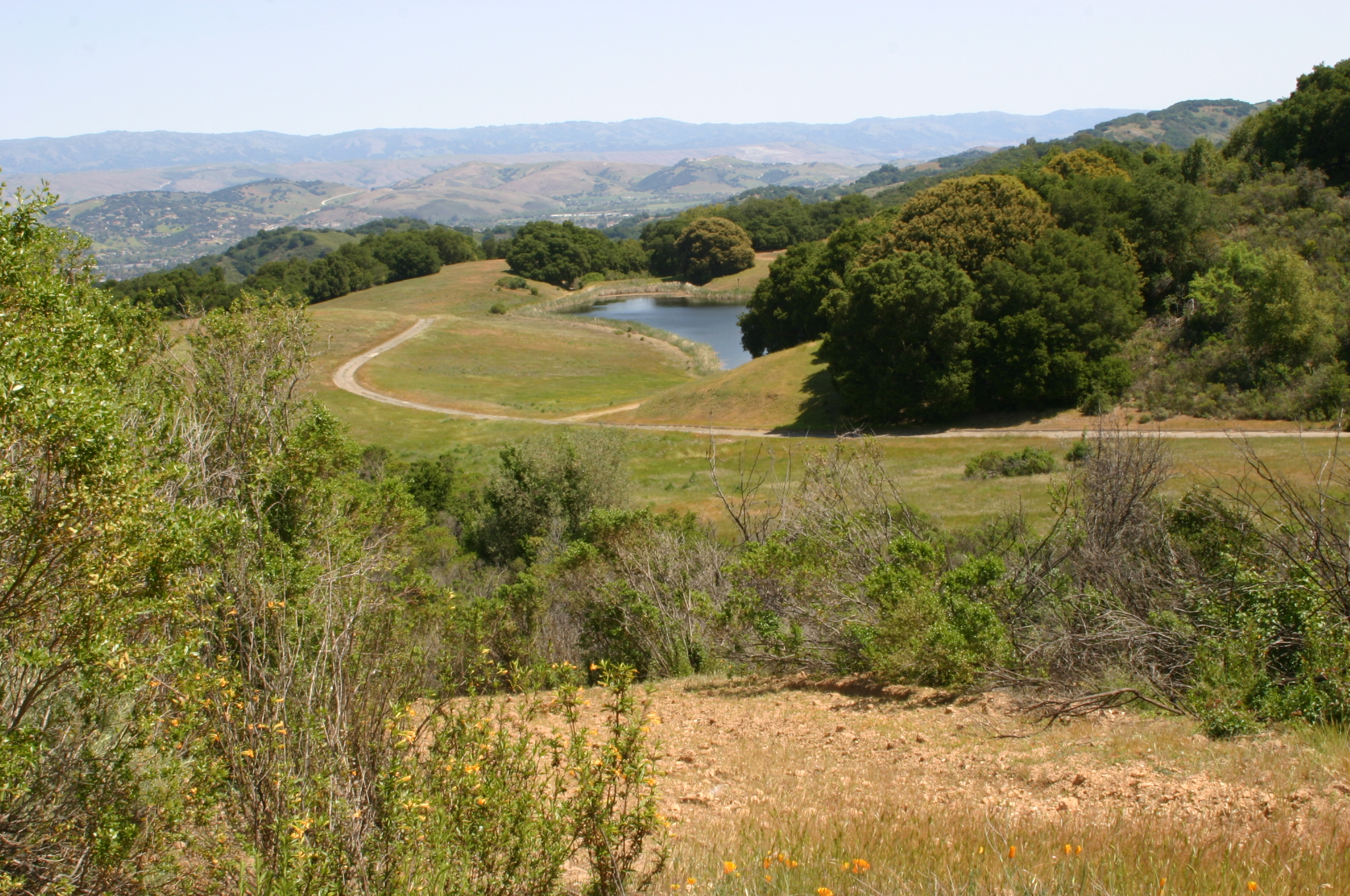
- View overlooking man-made Cherry Springs Pond, the source of Cherry Springs Creek, tributary to Hicks Creek and thence to Guadalupe Creek

- Location of the mouth of Guadalupe Creek

Location
- Country: United States
- State: California
- Region: Santa Clara County
- City: Blossom Valley, San Jose, California

Physical characteristics
- Source: Mount Umunhum
  - location: Santa Clara County, California
  - coordinates: 37°09′31″N 121°53′59″W
  - elevation: 3,161 ft (963 m)
- Mouth: Guadalupe River
  - coordinates: 37°14′48″N 121°52′16″W
  - elevation: 197 ft (60 m)

Basin features
- Tributaries
  - left: Rincon Creek (Santa Clara County, California), Hicks Creek, Pheasant Creek, Shannon Creek
  - right: Los Capitancillos Creek

Guadalupe Creek is a 10.5 miles (16.9 km) northward-flowing stream originating just east of the peak of Mount Umunhum in Santa Clara County, California, United States. It courses along the northwestern border of Almaden Quicksilver County Park in the Cañada de los Capitancillos before joining Los Alamitos Creek after the latter exits Lake Almaden. This confluence forms the Guadalupe River mainstem, which in turn flows through San Jose and empties into south San Francisco Bay at Alviso Slough.

== History ==
The "Valley of the Little Captains" or Rancho Cañada de los Capitancillos is named for the cañada, or valley, through which Guadalupe Creek courses. The river was once used for recreation prior to the removal of the Guadalupe Dam.

== Watershed and course ==
The Guadalupe Creek subwatershed drains 14.8 square miles (38 km^{2}). Heading downstream east from the peak of Mount Umunhum, Guadalupe Creek is joined on the left by Rincon Creek, then on the right by Los Capitancillos Creek before reaching Guadalupe Reservoir. Guadalupe Dam, built in 1935, formed the reservoir. The main purpose of the reservoir is to capture runoff from winter storms to recharge in the Alamitos percolation pond system during the summer.

Below Guadalupe Dam, Guadalupe Creek follows Hicks Road, and just below the intersection of Reynolds Road is joined on the left first by perennial Hicks Creek (which originates at Cherry Springs and is alternatively known as Reynolds Creek and Cherry Springs Creek) on the northern side of El Sombroso Peak. Hicks Creek has a small perennial tributary, Cherry Springs Creek, which originates at Cherry Springs Pond and flows into Hicks Creek from the west. The next Guadalupe River tributary is Pheasant Creek, which runs between Pheasant and Wagner Roads to join Guadalupe Creek from the left. At the intersection of Shannon Road and Hicks Road, Guadalupe Creek is joined next from the left by Shannon Creek.

Further downstream is Masson Dam, built in 1964, a small diversion dam about 1.3 miles (2.1 km) upstream of Almaden Expressway. The dam conveys water into the Los Capitancillos percolation ponds continually, unless Guadalupe Reservoir spills, in which case diversion operations terminate until the rainy season ends. In 1999, Masson Dam, which had been a complete barrier to fish passage, was removed and then re-built, along with a fish ladder which was completed in 2000. Completed in 1962 and reconstructed in 1964, the Los Capitancillos percolation ponds occupy about 63 acres, from Almaden Expressway (east) to Camden Avenue (west).

Guadalupe Creek crosses Almaden Expressway just before joining Los Alamitos Creek at Lake Almaden, where their confluence forms the beginning of the mainstem Guadalupe River. Lake Almaden was historically a meadow but was formed by a gravel removing quarry operation. Guadalupe Creek has been entirely earthen since a short 500 foot section of concrete channel was removed near its confluence with Pheasant Creek.

== Ecology ==
Steelhead trout (Oncorhynchus mykiss) spawned historically in Guadalupe Creek and its Pheasant Creek and Hicks (Cherry Springs) Creek tributaries through the 1950s but construction of Masson Dam formed an impassable barrier. Although it is not clear whether steelhead use the dam's fish ladder (constructed in 2000), resident rainbow trout (the landlocked form of steelhead trout) persist in the upper Guadalupe Creek above the dam. A 2014-2015 steelhead trout survey found "Guadalupe Creek above Hicks Road had the longest contiguous area of flowing freshwater" with appropriate conditions for residence of O. mykiss in the Guadalupe River watershed, with the highest trout catch near the mouth of Pheasant Creek. O. mykiss collected above and below Guadalupe Reservoir have genetics similar to federally threatened Central California Coast Steelhead DPS distinct population segment (DPS) with no evidence of introgression from hatchery fish, despite previous stocking.

Observation with a Vaki Riverwatcher fishcounter installed at the Masson Dam fish ladder during the 2006-2007 and 2007-2008 spawning seasons confirmed that steelhead trout, Pacific lamprey (Lampetra tridentata), and Sacramento sucker (Catostomus occidentalis), and possibly a Chinook salmon (Oncorhynchus tshawytscha) ascended above it. This is consistent with an historic observer account of steelhead and salmon being caught by the Beltran residence where Shannon Road connects with Hicks Road, although this was likely prior to the construction of Masson Dam. There has been no fish counter installed at Masson Dam since 2008.

The creek below Guadalupe Reservoir and Dam supports the western pond turtle (Actinemys marmorata), foothill yellow-legged frog (Rana boylii), yellow warbler, double crested cormorant, in addition to rainbow trout.

Rare flora include Mount Hamilton thistle (Cirsium fontinale var. campylon ), Santa Clara Valley dudleya (Dudleya setchellii)(Endangered), Santa Clara red ribbons (Clarkia concinna automixa), fragrant fritillary (Fritillaria liliacea) and the Mount Hamilton jewelflower (Streptanthus callistus).

== Mercury contamination ==
Guadalupe Creek is impaired (303(d) listed) by mercury contamination. Historically, workers disposed of roasted mercury mining wastes, called calcines, and other waste in or near Guadalupe Creek and Los Alamitos Creek so that waste materials would be transported downstream by winter flows. Guadalupe Reservoir covers a former mercury ore processing area. Calcines and other mining wastes are still present along the banks of Guadalupe Creek above Camden Avenue, along the banks of upper Guadalupe Creek near the former Guadalupe Mine outside of the Almaden Quicksilver County Park. A partly vegetated mining waste pile is present at Hicks Flat on the opposite side of Guadalupe Creek from the main mine.

A half-mile stretch of Guadalupe Creek between Almaden Expressway and Masson Dam was restored in 2001 as mitigation for the downtown San Jose flood control project. Restoration included removal of mercury-contaminated sediments and recreation of a meandering stream course with native vegetation.

The California Office of Environmental Health Hazard Assessment (OEHHA) has developed a safe eating advisory for Guadelupe Creek, stating that no one should eat any fish caught here.

== See also ==
- List of watercourses in the San Francisco Bay Area
