= Canoas Creek (Santa Clara County) =

Creek in California

Canoas Creek Arroyo de las Tulares de las Canoas
- Etymology: Spanish for Canoe Creek

Location
- Country: United States
- State: California
- Region: Santa Clara County
- City: Edenvale, San Jose, Santa Teresa, San Jose, Blossom Valley, San Jose, Communications Hill, San Jose

Physical characteristics
- Source: Santa Teresa Hills
  - location: Santa Clara County, California
- Mouth: Guadalupe River
  - coordinates: 37°17′19″N 121°52′55″W

Canoas Creek is a tributary creek to the Guadalupe River. Canoas Creek was originally a series of ponds and wetlands named "Arroyo de las Tulares de las Canoas" after the numerous tule plants in these marshes that were used to build canoes. In 1889, the city of San Jose used Santa Clara County prison labor to build a 2,000 foot hand dug channel to connect Canoas Creek at Almaden Road to the Guadalupe Creek in order to drain the marsh.

Canoas Creek is prone to flash floods that have caused the Guadalupe Creek to flood downtown San Jose. Over time, the creek has been dug deeper, and in the 1970s much of the creek was turned into concrete channels.

Fish caught in this creek include: bass, carp, catfish and trout. Valley Water manages the upkeep of the concrete channels as well as reducing the vegetation along the creek using a large herd of goats.
