= Guadalupe Reservoir =

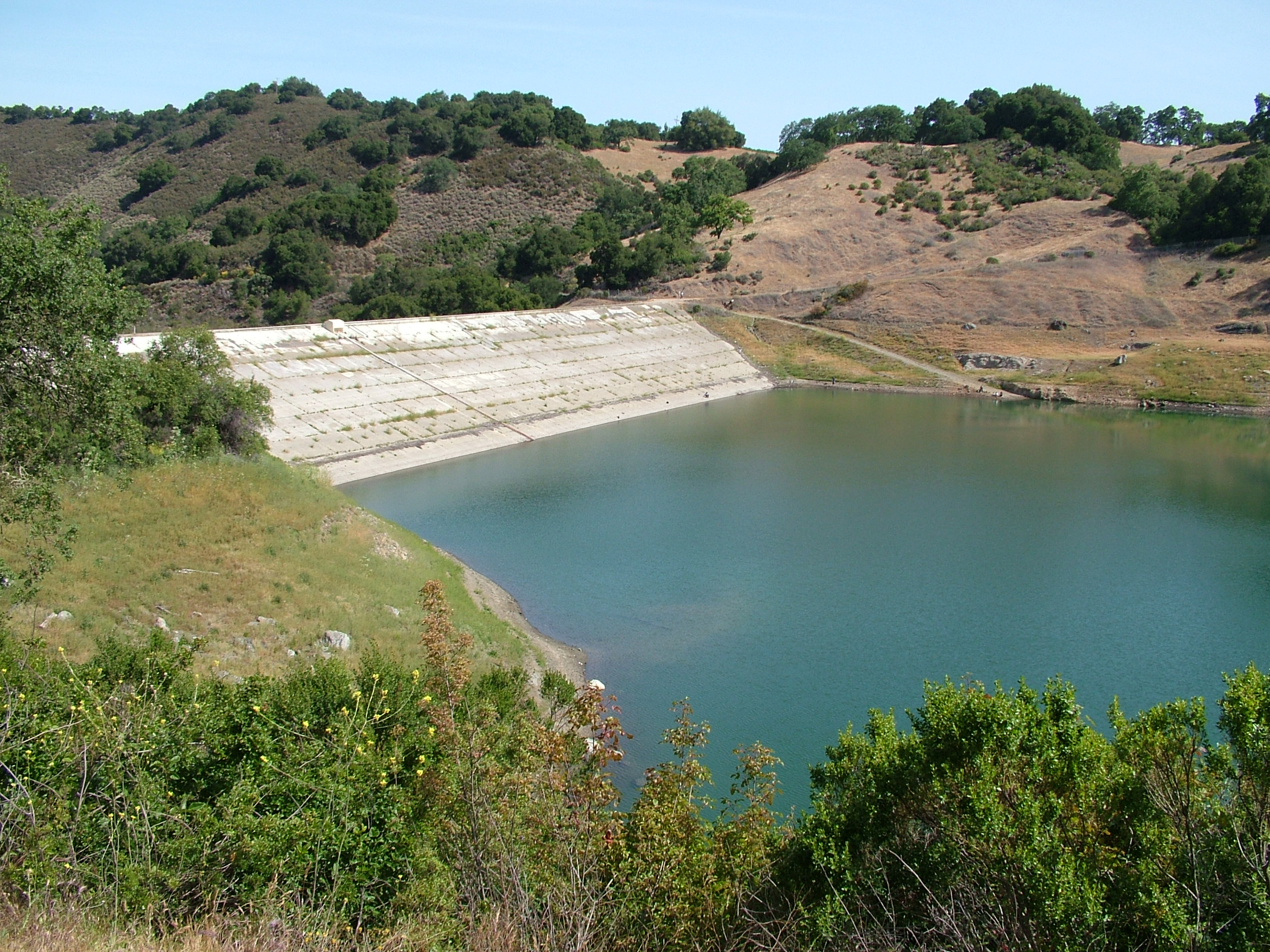

- Location within California Location within the United States
- Location: Santa Clara County, California
- Coordinates: 37.19827°N 121.876659°W
- Type: Reservoir
- Primary inflows: Guadalupe Creek
- Primary outflows: Guadalupe Creek
- Basin countries: United States
- Max. length: 6,600 ft (2,000 m)
- Max. width: 660 ft (200 m)
- Surface area: 74 acres (300,000 m^{2})
- Water volume: 3,415 acre⋅ft (4,212,000 m^{3})
- Surface elevation: 618 ft (188 m)

Guadalupe Reservoir is a reservoir in Santa Clara County, California, United States, about 15 miles (24 km) south of the city of San Jose, California. It is at an elevation of 614 feet (187 m). It has a surface area of 74 acres (300,000 m^{2}) and a capacity of 3,415 acre-feet (4,212,000 m^{3}). The reservoir is located along Hicks Road on Guadalupe Creek, a tributary of the Guadalupe River. The Guadalupe River was named Rio de Nuestra Señora de Guadalupe on March 30, 1776, by the de Anza expedition, in honor of the Mexican saint who was the principal patron saint of the expedition. Guadalupe dam and reservoir, constructed in 1935, is one of the six original systems approved for construction by voters in 1934.

The California Office of Environmental Health Hazard Assessment (OEHHA) has developed a safe eating advisory for the reservoir, stating no one should eat any fish caught there.

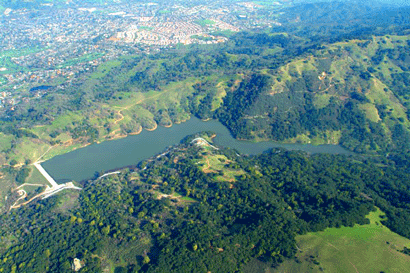
Guadalupe Reservoir from the air

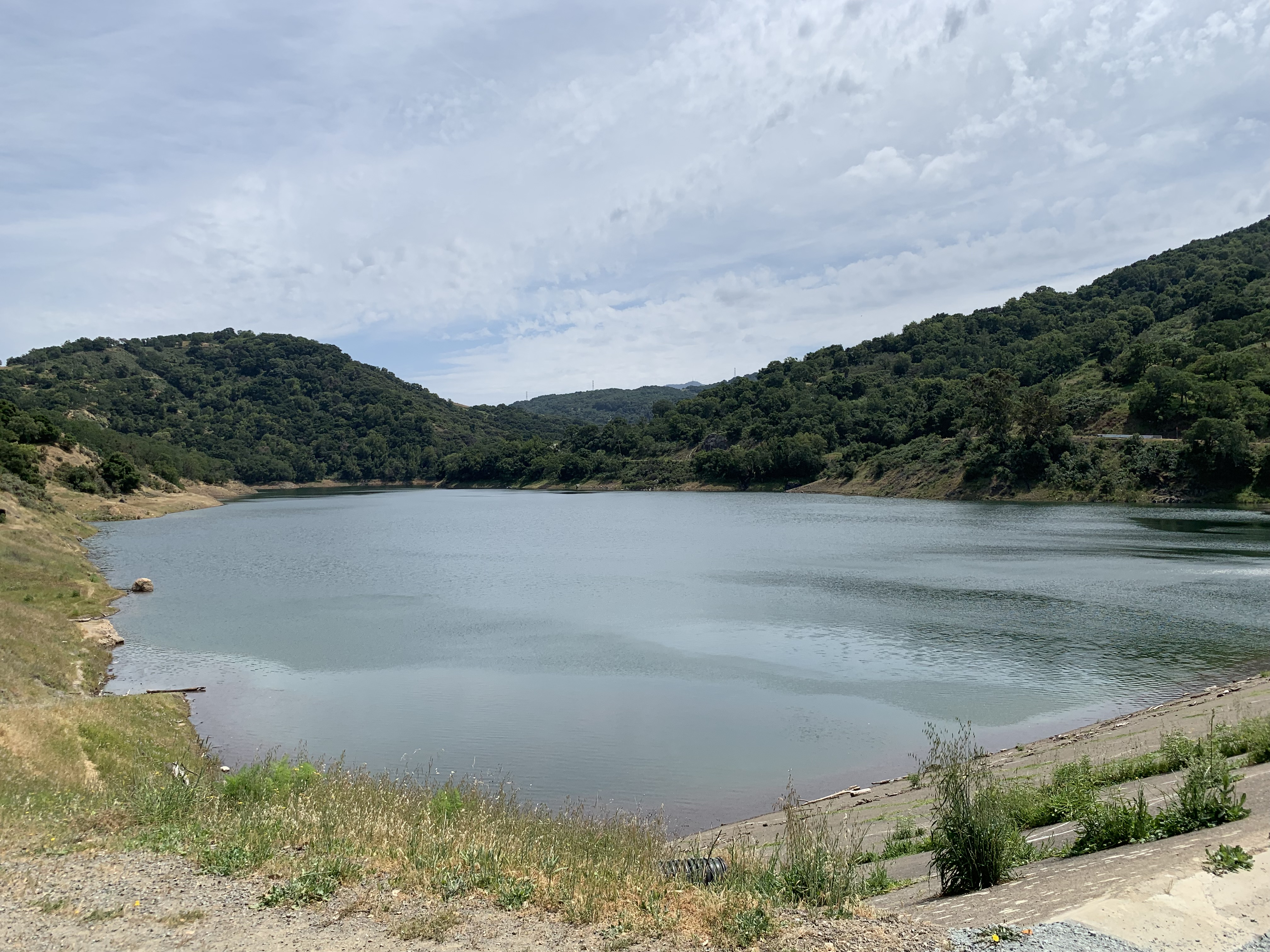
Guadalupe Reservoir, looking south from the dam

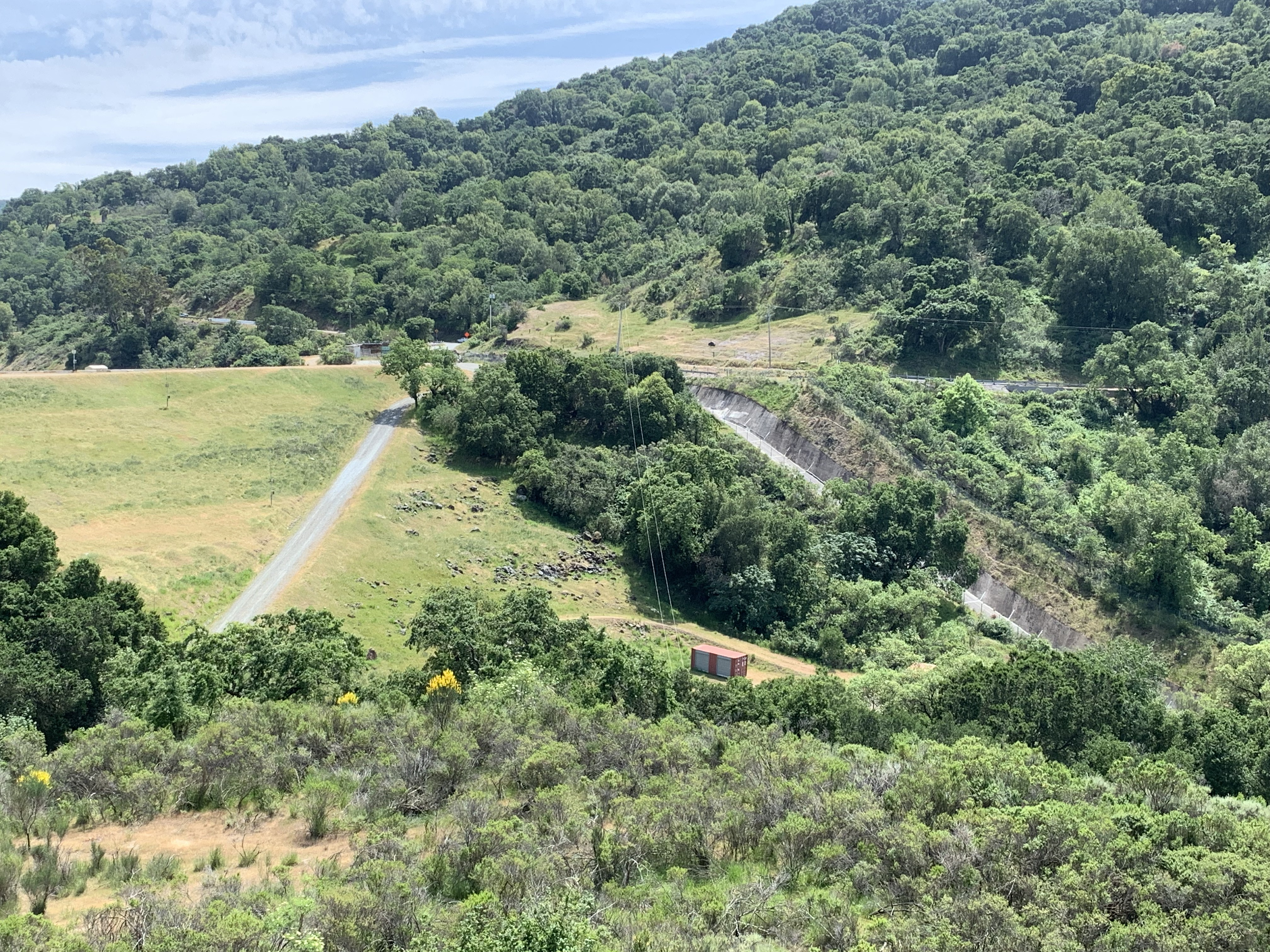
Guadalupe Reservoir spillway, looking south from the hills

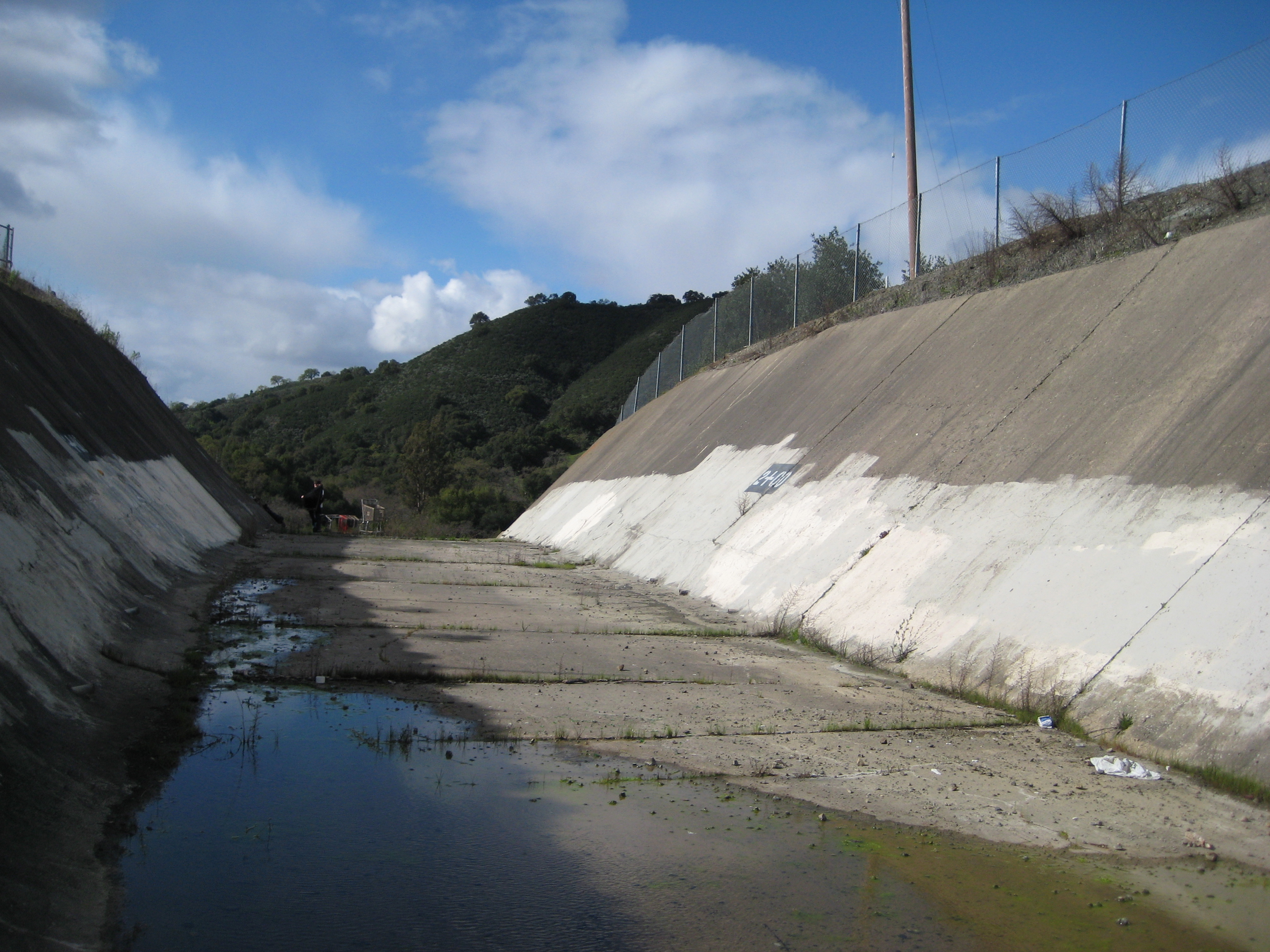
Guadalupe Reservoir spillway

== See also ==
- List of lakes in California
- List of lakes in the San Francisco Bay Area
