= Mount Umunhum =

Mountain in California, United States

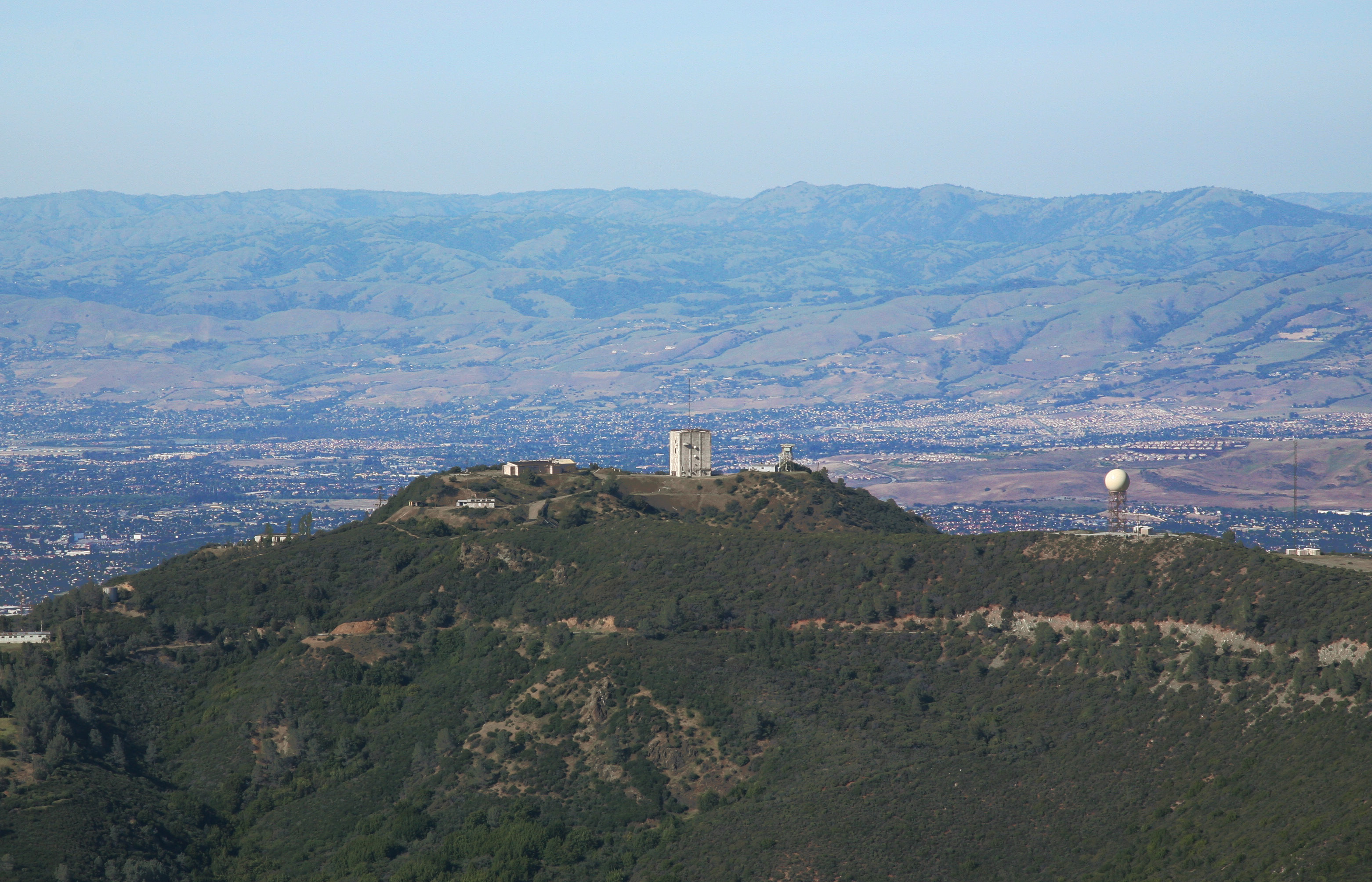
- Mount Umunhum from the southwest

Highest point
- Elevation: 3,489 ft (1,063 m) NAVD 88
- Prominence: 586 ft (179 m)
- Coordinates: 37°09′38″N 121°53′55″W

Geography
- Location within California
- Location: Santa Clara County, California, United States
- Parent range: Santa Cruz Mountains
- Topo map: USGS Los Gatos

Geology
- Rock age: Oligocene

Climbing
- Easiest route: Mount Umunhum Rd

Mount Umunhum (/ˈʌmənʌm/ UH-mə-num) is a peak in the Santa Cruz Mountains, located in Santa Clara County, California. It is the fourth-highest peak in the Santa Cruz Mountains, after Loma Prieta, Crystal Peak, and Mount Chual. Most of the mountain is located within the Sierra Azul Open Space Preserve.

== Geology ==
Mount Umunhum consists of a geologic formation that is known as the Coast Range Ophiolite. This ophiolite is a piece of Middle Jurassic oceanic crust and mantle that has been obducted onto land and largely been converted to serpentinite. It has been extensively faulted and diapirically uplifted and eroded to form Mt. Umunhum and extensive outcrop areas throughout the Santa Cruz Mountain foothills and elsewhere. The Coast Range Ophiolite is also known to underlie the rocks of the Great Valley throughout central California. The exposure on the northeast face of Mt. Umunhum is one of the best Bay Area exposures of the Coast Range Ophiolite.

Mount Umunhum and nearby Loma Prieta are pushed upward by local collision forces associated with a left bend in the San Andreas Fault. Starting near Uvas Canyon, the fault stops trending northwest but instead bends west-northwest for about eight miles before continuing its northwest direction. This left bend is renowned among geologists as an archetypal restraining bend which acts to oppose strike-slip motion along the fault. From the perspective of Mount Umunhum and other mountains atop the Sierra Azul block, the Pacific Plate is trying to shear them off the North American Plate but can't break them off. Rather, the resulting transpression force pushes up the local terrain and helps explain why these are the highest peaks in the Santa Cruz Mountains.

== History ==
Mount Umunhum is from Ohlone and means "Resting Place of the Hummingbird".

The Cube, a radar tower which housed an 85.5-ton AN/FPS-24 radar, was completed in 1962 and used to watch for hostile aircraft during the Cold War. Its signal caused electronic interference in many radio, TV and sound systems within its 250-mile range on each rotation.

The summit was closed to the public due to hazardous materials and unsafe conditions caused by partially demolished structures from the former Air Force station. Plans were made to clean it up and restore it for public use. "In 2009, with federal funding, Midpeninsula Regional Open Space District removed 3,000 cubic yards of hazardous materials, including lead paint, asbestos, fuel storage containers and PCB transformers; and deconstructed 13,680 tons of concrete, asphalt, wood and other materials." Despite these measures access to the summit area surrounding the cube was closed again in 2018 pending additional cleanup. The demolition of the cube was considered, but in May 2016, the Santa Clara County Board of Supervisors listed it on the County Heritage Resource Inventory, giving it official historic status and protecting it from demolition. On September 18, 2017, the road, a mountain biking and hiking trail to the summit were opened. Facilities include new pavement, restrooms, interpretive displays and a small parking lot at the summit. It is a spur of the Bay Area Ridge Trail.

In 2017, the Midpeninsula Regional Open Space District granted an easement to the Amah Mutsun tribal band, descendants of the Ohlone Native American people who inhabited the region before it was settled by Europeans. The easement authorized the band to build a garden and hold ceremonies on the mountaintop.

In March 2022, the $2 million renovation project to preserve the historical building was completed.

== Facilities ==
The mountain is topped by an eight and a half story (84.5 feet tall) concrete radar tower (5 floors interior), known locally as "the Cube" or "the Box". The tower was part of Almaden Air Force Station, a radar surveillance post which operated from 1958 to 1980.

The mountain is also the site of the Bay Area NEXRAD weather radar. The high elevation is necessary for line of sight in the region's varied terrain, but it also limits the ability to detect storms with bases lower in the atmosphere.

== Gallery ==
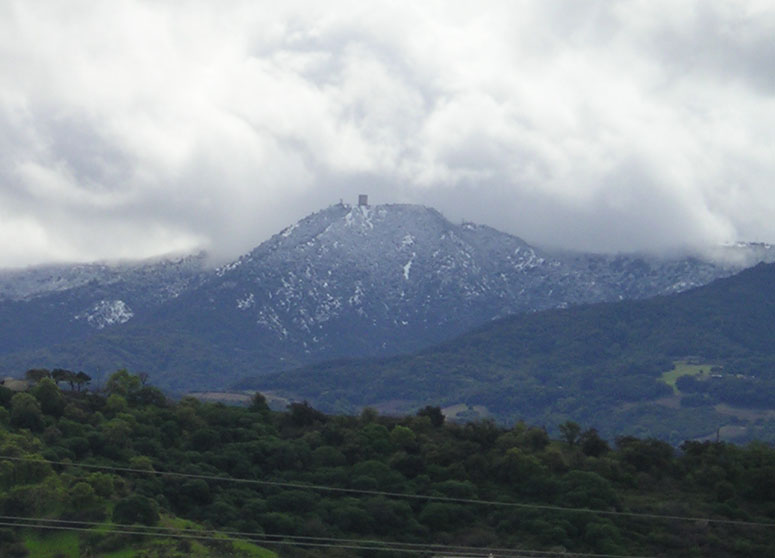
Mount Umunhum is occasionally dusted with snow

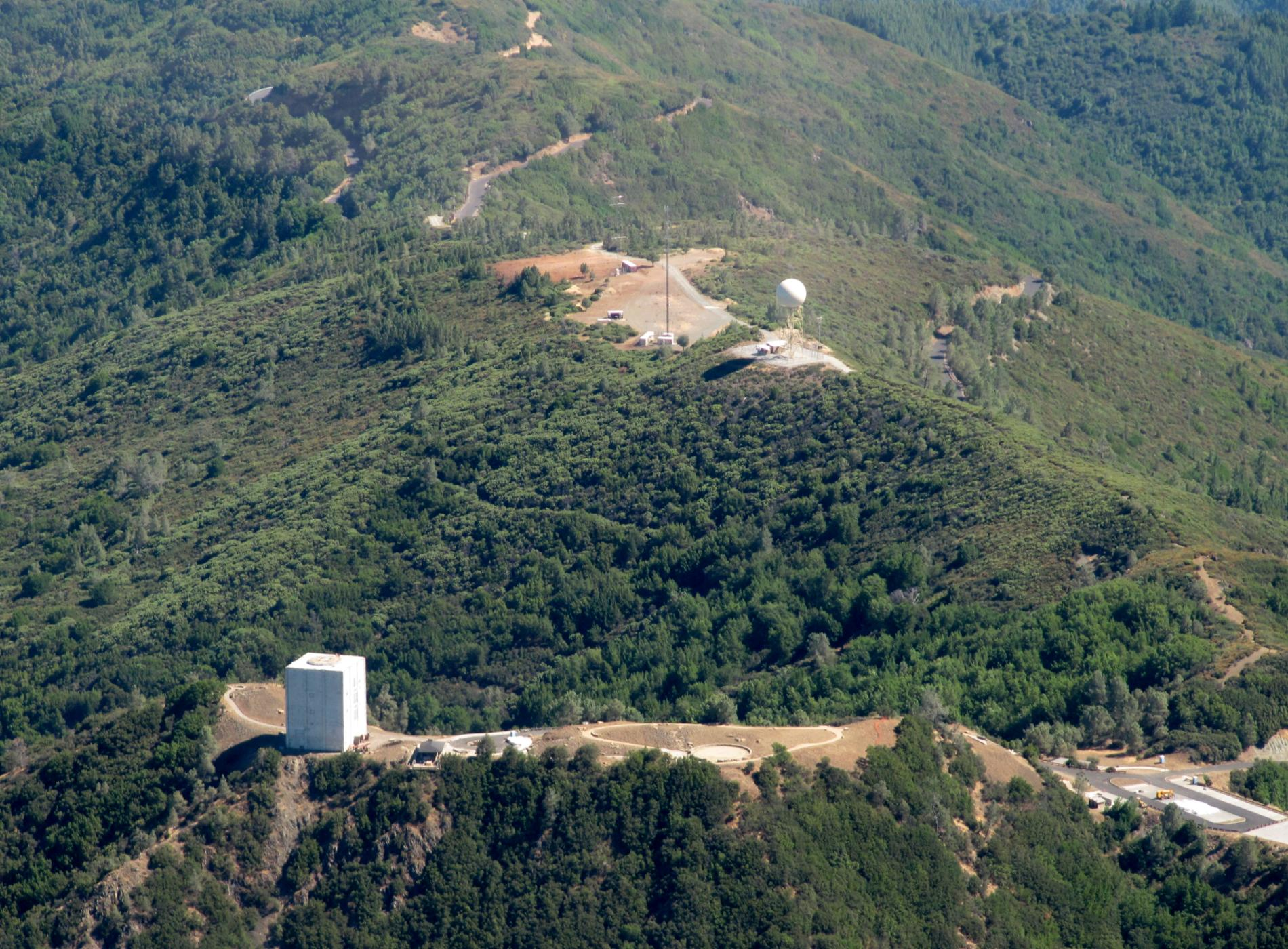
Aerial view from the north

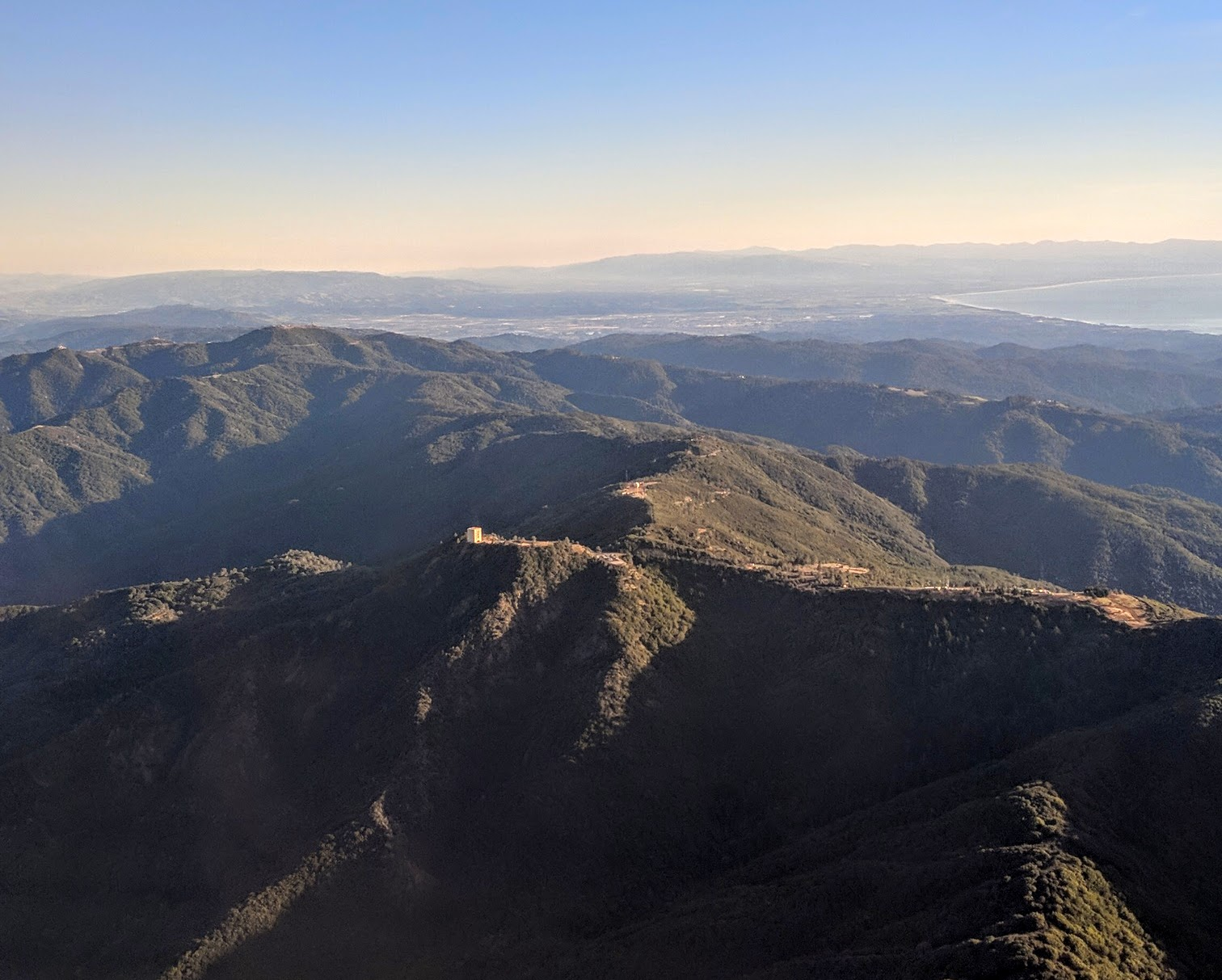
Aerial view with Monterey Bay in background

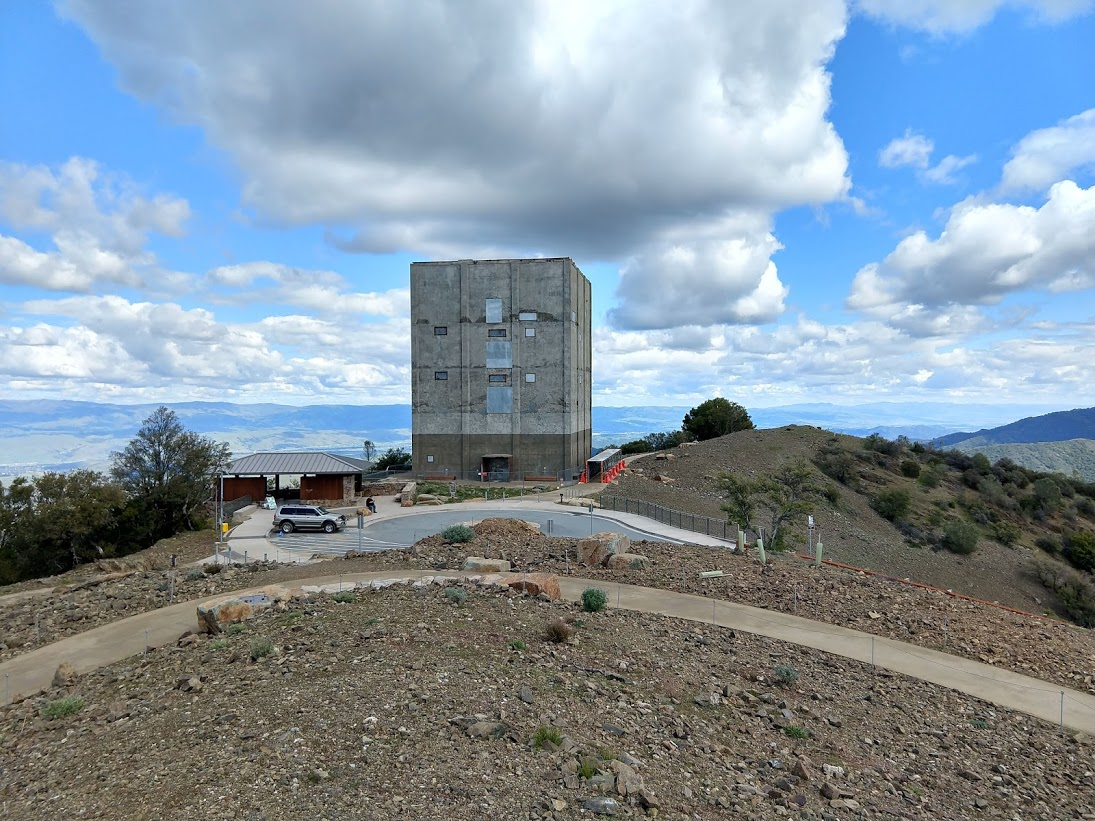
The abandoned radar tower and parking lot in 2020

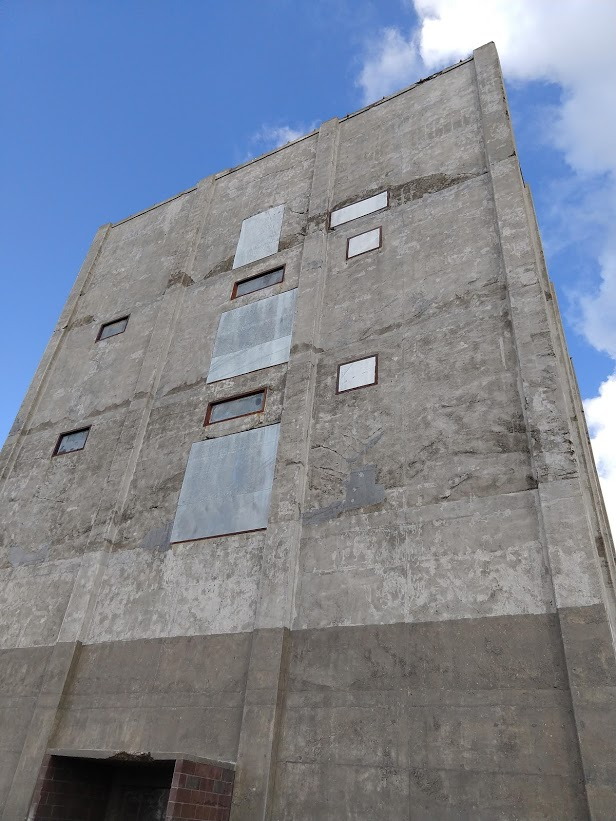
The abandoned radar tower in 2020

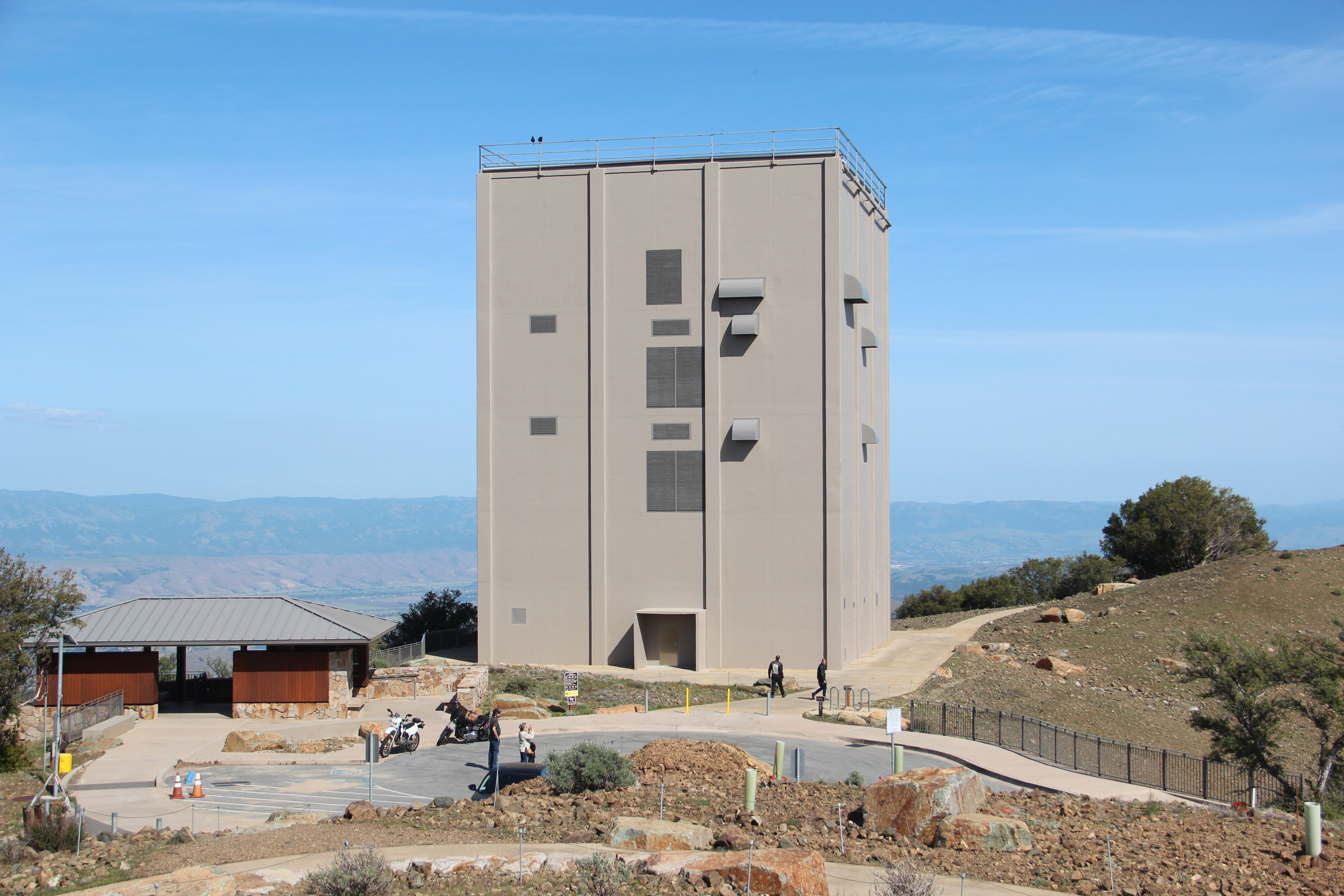
The radar tower and parking lot in 2022 after renovation

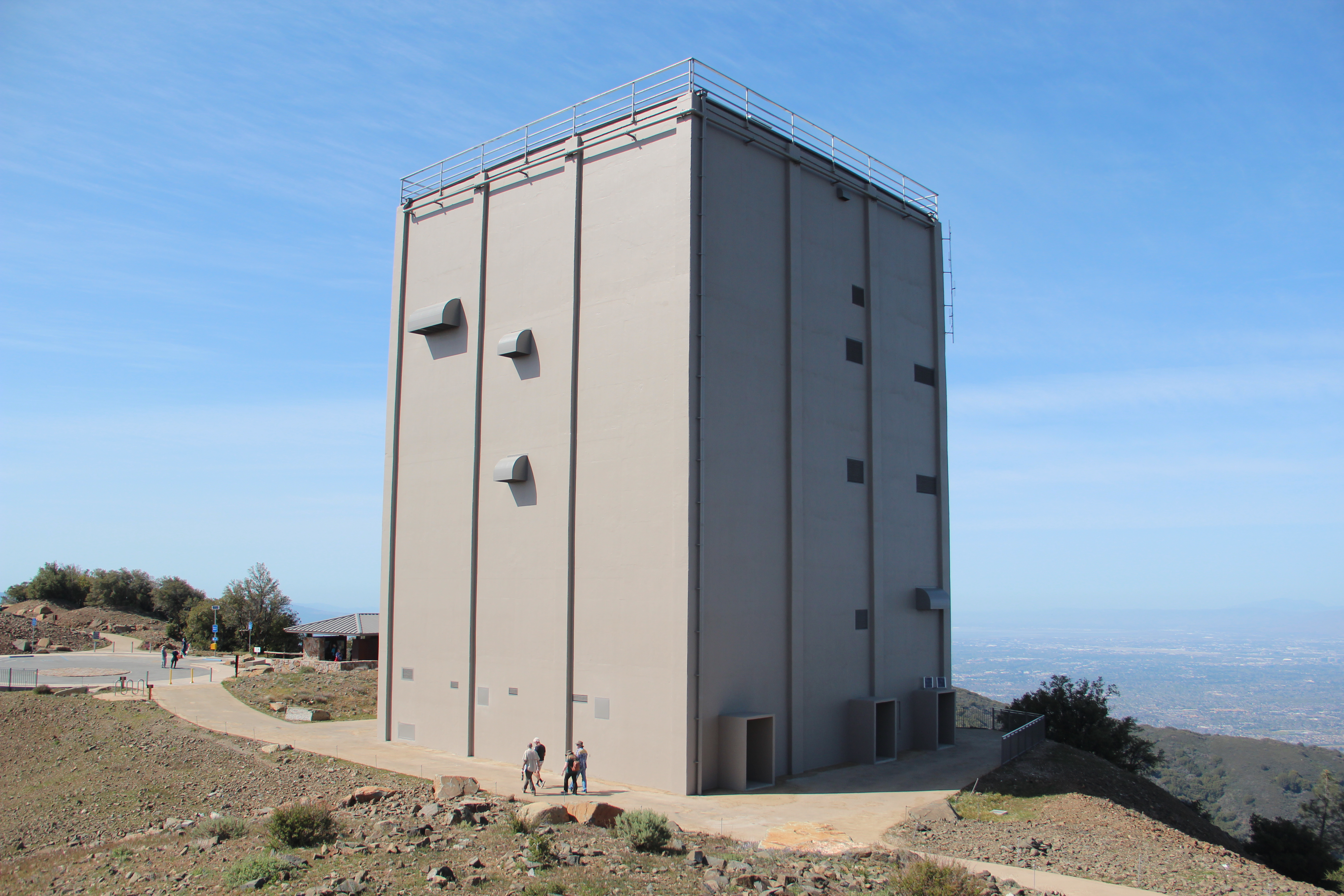
The radar tower in 2022

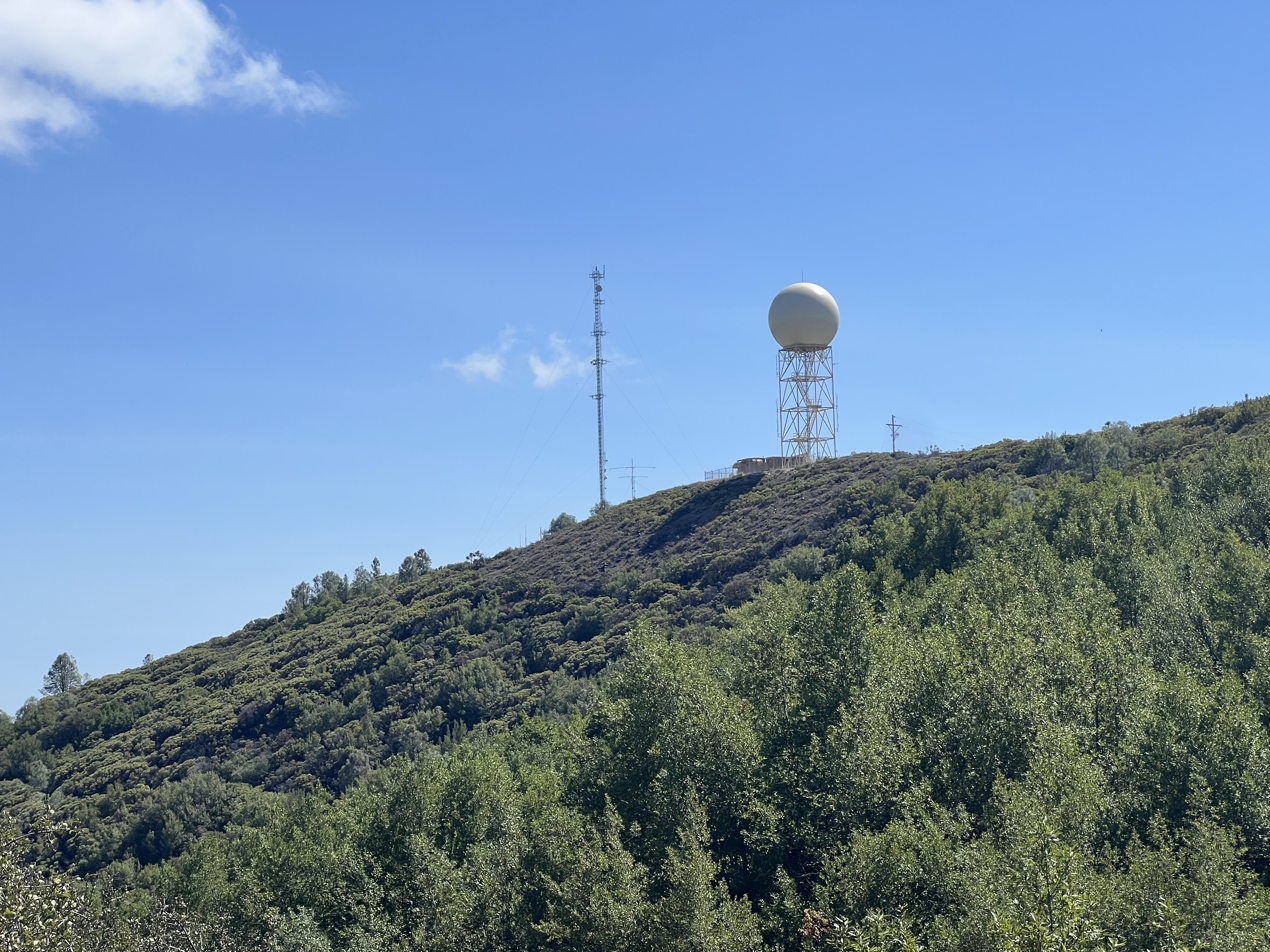
NEXRAD weather radar

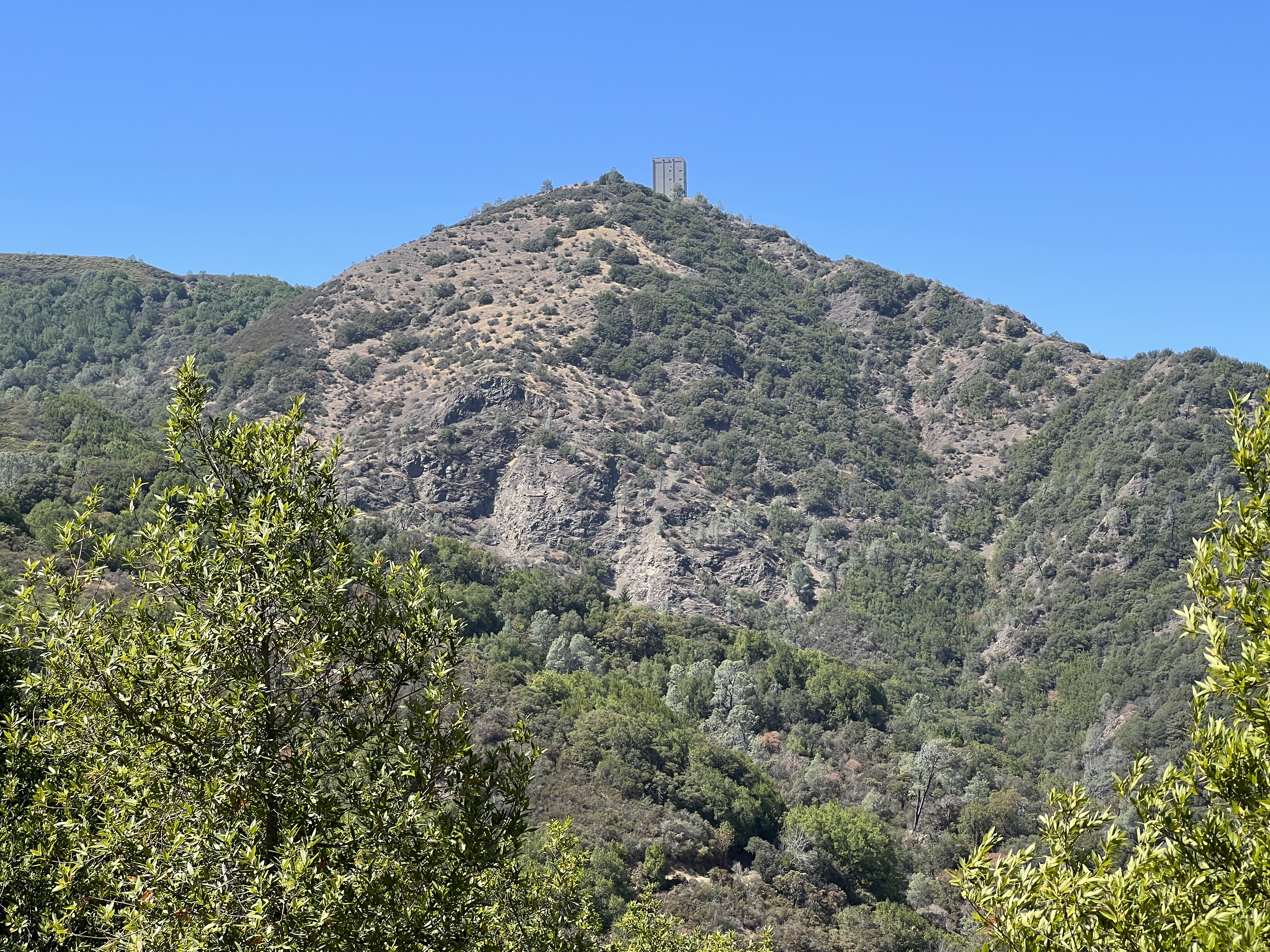
Mount Umunhum, looking west from Mount Umunhum Rd

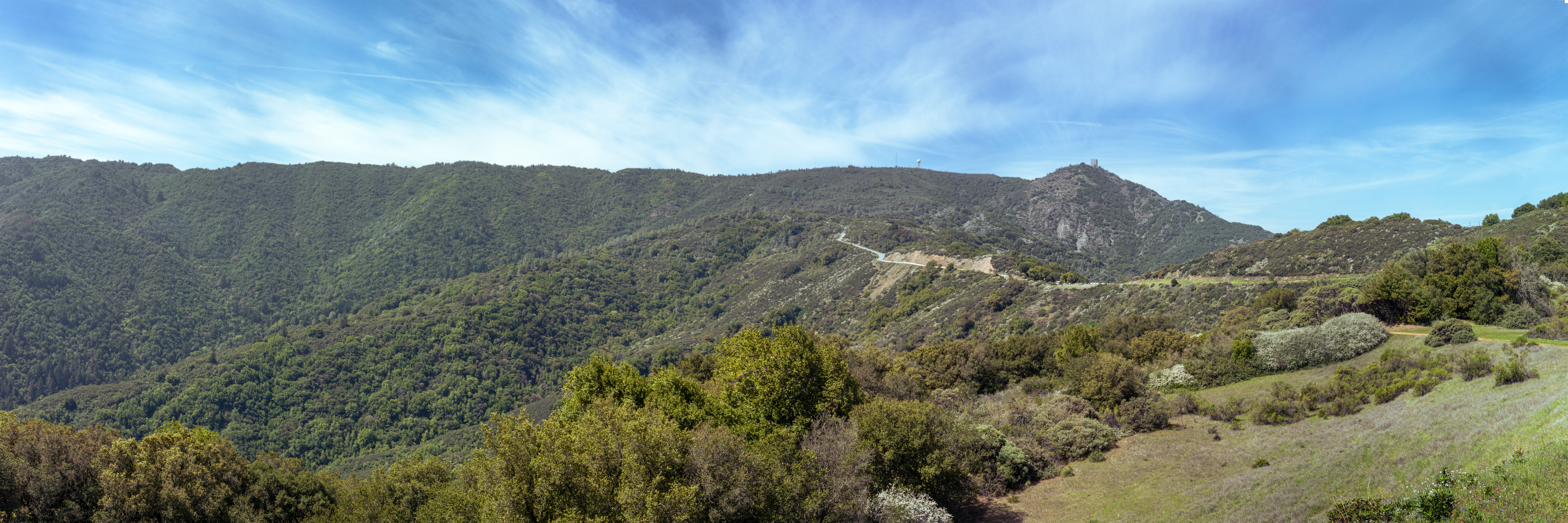
Mount Umunhum as seen from Bald Mountain
