= Loma Prieta =

Highest peak in the Santa Cruz Mountains in Northern California

Loma Prieta Peak
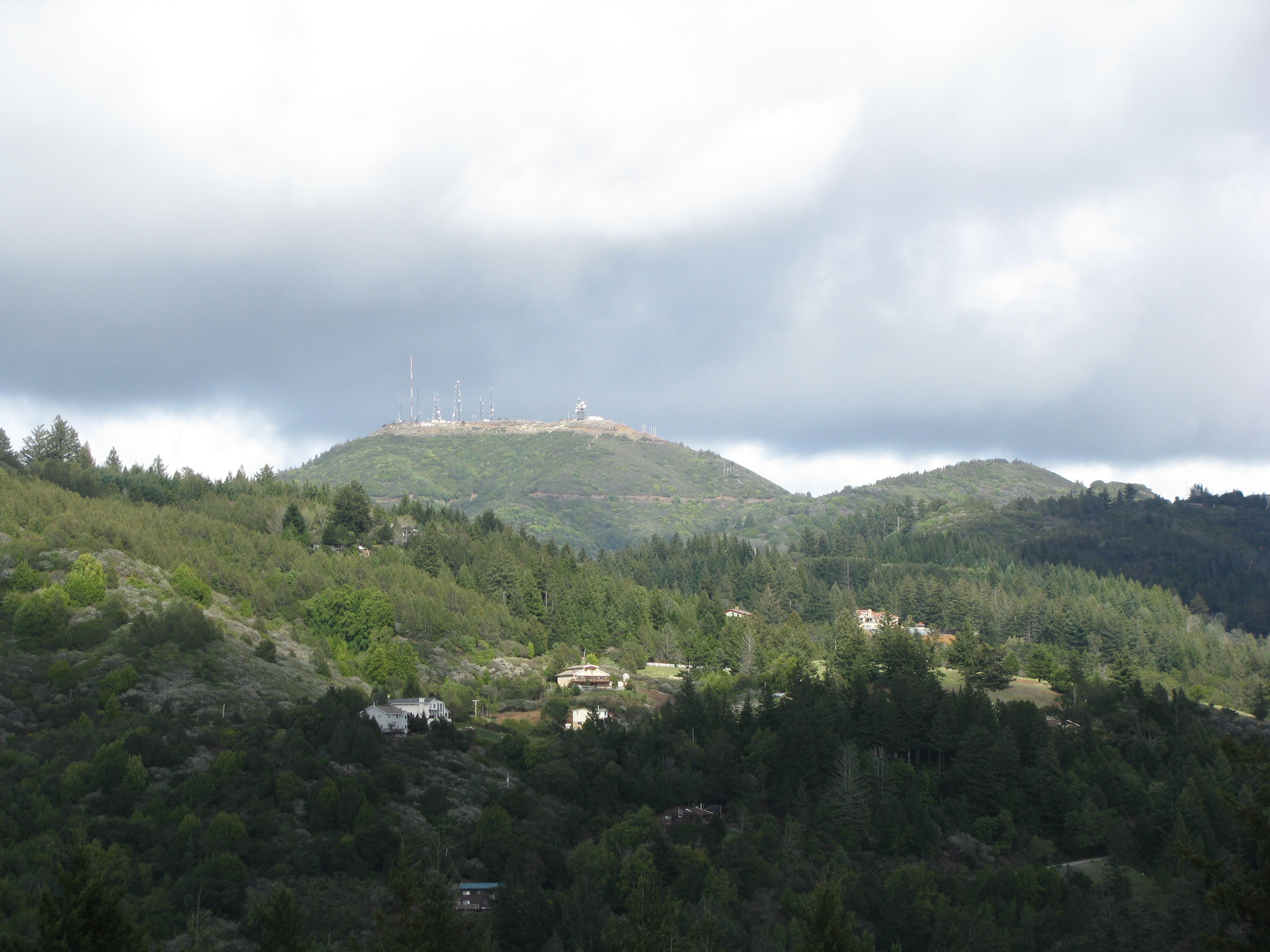
- Loma Prieta from the West

Highest point
- Elevation: 3,786 ft (1,154 m) NAVD 88
- Prominence: 3,425 ft (1,044 m) NGVD 29
- Coordinates: 37°06′40″N 121°50′39″W

Naming
- English translation: Dark Hill
- Language of name: Spanish

Geography
- Location within California Location within the United States
- Location: Santa Clara County, California, U.S.
- Parent range: Santa Cruz Mountains
- Topo map: USGS Loma Prieta

Climbing
- Easiest route: RoadAlexander Dallas Bache

Loma Prieta (Spanish for "Black Hill") is the highest peak in the Santa Cruz Mountains in Northern California, measuring 3,790 feet (1,160 m) in height.

Although the 1989 Loma Prieta earthquake was named for this mountain, the actual epicenter was five miles southwest of the peak, across the San Andreas Fault, in The Forest of Nisene Marks State Park.

In the 19th century, the peak was called Mount Bache, a name given in honor of Alexander Dallas Bache; the name is no longer in use.

From 1955 to 2005, the mountain was the longtime site for the transmitter tower of San Jose television station KNTV. In September 2005, it moved its transmitter 83 kilometres (52 mi) northwest to San Bruno Mountain after it became the Bay Area's NBC affiliate.

== Geology ==
Loma Prieta is the tallest peak in the Santa Cruz Mountains and it is common to see snow on the mountain during the winter.

Loma Prieta and other nearby mountain peaks are pushed upward by local collision forces associated with a left bend in the San Andreas Fault. Starting near Uvas Canyon, the fault stops trending northwest but instead bends west-northwest for about eight miles before continuing its northwest direction. This left bend is renowned among geologists as an archetypal restraining bend which acts to oppose strike-slip motion along the fault. From the perspective of Loma Prieta and other mountains atop the Sierra Azul block, the Pacific Plate is trying to shear them off the North American Plate but can't break them off. Rather, the resulting transpression force pushes up the local terrain and helps explain why these are the highest peaks in the Santa Cruz Mountains.

== Astronomy ==
From 1976 through 1990 amateur astronomer Donald Machholz put up his telescope an average of 120 times a year on the south slope of this mountain to search for comets. From this site he discovered three new comets that bear his name, including Periodic Comet Machholz 1 96P/Machholz on May 12, 1986.

The first official West Coast Messier marathon was conducted from this site in March 1979.

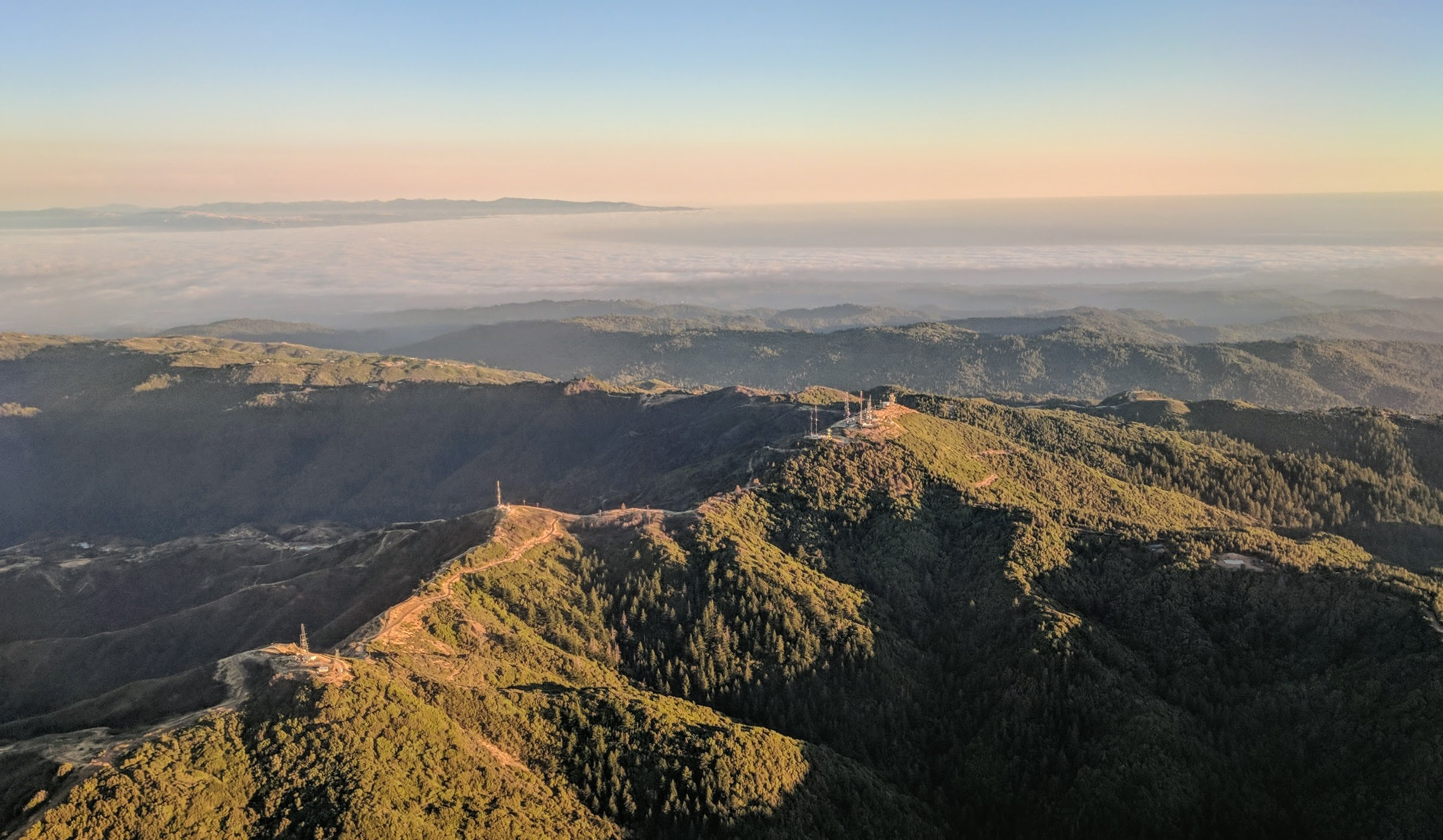
Loma Prieta (the peak just right of center) and other nearby peaks are decorated with television broadcast towers and other communication towers, serving the Santa Clara Valley. Fog-shrouded Monterey Bay and the Monterey peninsula are visible in the background in this late-afternoon approach to San José International Airport. On the left-near side you can see Crystal Peak and Mt. Chual.

== See also ==
- List of summits of the San Francisco Bay Area
