= Almaden Mine =

Almaden Mine can refer to:

- Mercury (quicksilver) mines in the Spanish city of Almadén, Ciudad Real, now a World Heritage site (Heritage of Mercury. Almadén and Idrija).
- Mercury (quicksilver) mines in New Almaden, California, USA. Now Almaden Quicksilver County Park.
