= Guadalupe River watershed =

Watershed in California, United States

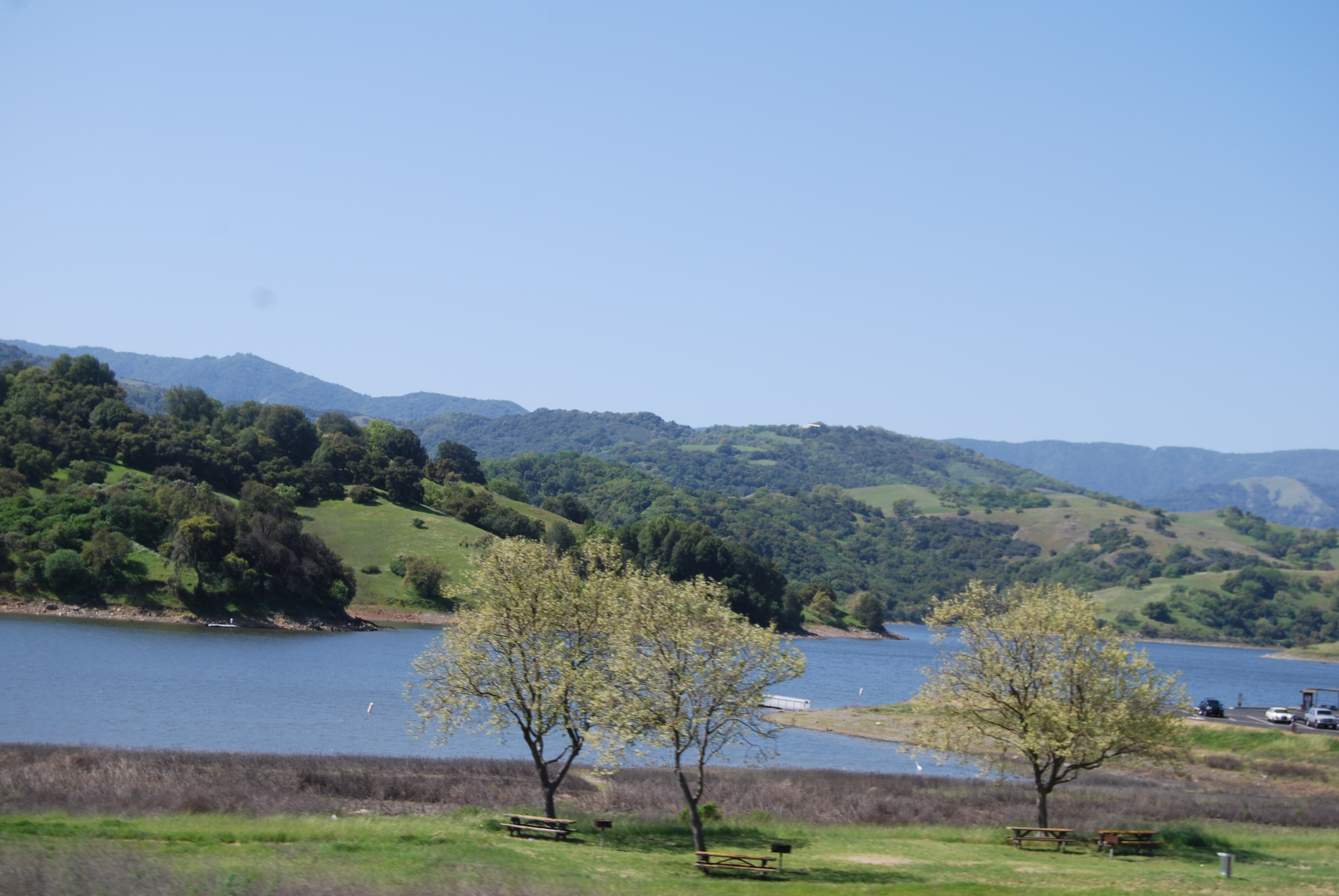
The Calero Reservoir.

The Guadalupe River watershed consists of 170 square miles (400 km^{2}) of land within northern California's Santa Clara County. The surface runoff from this area drains into the Guadalupe River, its tributary streams, reservoirs or other bodies of water which all eventually gets carried into the San Francisco Bay (indicated below, with surrounding counties in red). Essentially, all the water from the creeks and rivers that make up the Guadalupe watershed, including water from storm drains, flows into the Guadalupe River, and then flows downstream into the San Francisco Bay at the Alviso Slough in Alviso. The Guadalupe watershed's main tributaries include Los Gatos Creek, Trout Creek, Hendrys Creek, Ross Creek, Pheasant Creek, Rincon Creek, Herbert Creek, and Golf Creek. Six major reservoirs exist in the watershed: Calero Reservoir on Arroyo Calero, Guadalupe Reservoir on Guadalupe Creek, Almaden Reservoir on Los Alamitos Creek, Vasona Reservoir, Lexington Reservoir, and Lake Elsman on Los Gatos Creek.

The area covered by the Guadalupe River and its tributaries spreads over the neighboring cities of San Jose, Los Gatos, Monte Sereno, Campbell, and Santa Clara.

== Mercury contamination ==
The Guadalupe watershed was an area of high activity during the California Gold Rush, and as a result, Mercury toxicity and its effects on surrounding citizens and wildlife is a major concern for the area, and monitored intensively. Because mercury is an effective magnet for gold, miners during the Gold Rush would regularly line their sluices with mercury to amalgamate the gold out. An estimated 6,500 tons of mercury was lost in the system of creeks and rivers along the coast between 1850 and 1920, and is still being detected today in the water, animal life, and riverbeds of these affected tributaries.

The effects of mercury on aquatic environments are very complex and create a number of health and safety risks. The most dangerous effect is its conversion into methylmercury by bacteria in rivers and lakes, which is in fact a more toxic substance than plain mercury. Methylmercury has a capacity to be taken in by insects and other invertebrates which the fish eat, which are in turn consumed by humans. Through this process of biomagnification, the methylmercury concentration increases the further up the food chain it reaches.

=== Health effects ===
Methylmercury is known for impairing neurological development in fetuses, infants, and small children. Exposure in the womb from a mother's consumption of contaminated fish and shellfish can harm a baby's newly developing brain and nervous system. There are notable impacts on cognitive thinking, memory, attention, language, and fine motor and visual spatial skills in children that have been exposed to methylmercury in the womb. Methylmercury also causes a number of problems in adults, including impairment of the peripheral vision,"pins and needles" feelings, usually in the hands, feet, and around the mouth, lack of coordination of movements, impairment of speech, hearing, walking, and muscle weakness.

=== Environmental effects ===
Methylmercury that bioaccumulates in fish and the fish and other animals that eat them can reach harmful levels very quickly. Just how high these levels are depends on several factors, such as local non-air releases of mercury, naturally occurring mercury in soils, physical and biological properties of the water-body in question, and the age, size, and types of food the fish eats. Birds and mammals that eat fish are the most affected in the ecosystem because of their placement as predators in the food chain. Effects of methylmercury exposure on wildlife include death, as well as reduced fertility, slower growth and development, and abnormal behaviors that can drastically affect the animals survival.

== Santa Clara Valley Water District involvement ==
The Santa Clara Valley Water District (SCVWD) is not only the county’s water wholesaler, but is also the steward of all the rivers, streams, and reservoirs for the area. The SCVWD reached an agreement with the San Francisco Bay Regional Water Quality Control Board by which a $1 million long-term project was funded in order to reduce the levels of mercury contamination in the Guadalupe watershed, including all areas from the upper Santa Cruz Mountains all the way to the San Francisco Bay. A survey was initiated in September 2003 in order to find adequate methods of disposing of mercury deposits. The disposal of these deposits is being funded by the California State Cleanup and Abatement Account.
