= Alamitos Creek =

Los Alamitos Creek Arroyo de los Alamitos
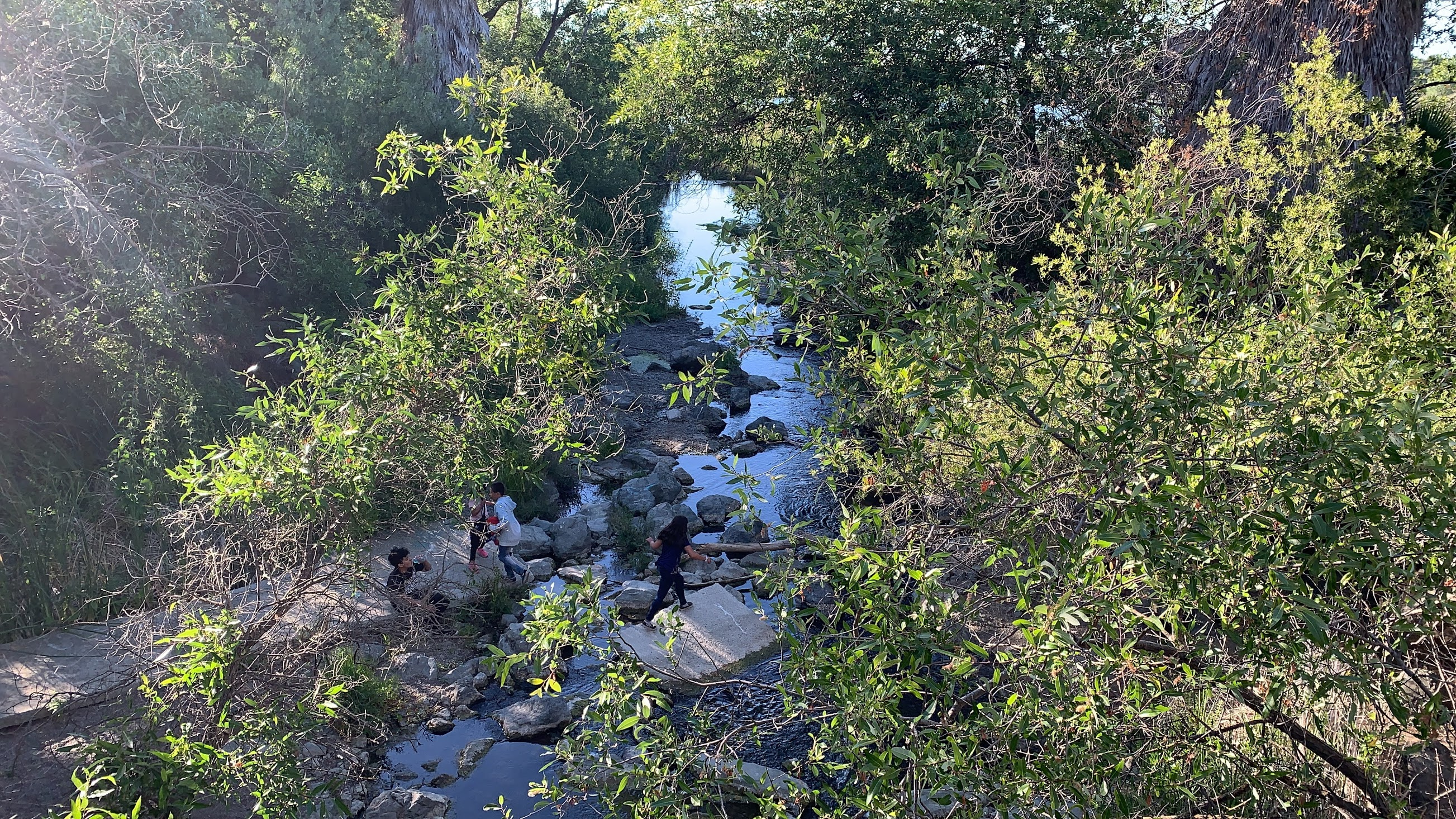
- Los Alamitos Creek

- Location of the mouth in California
- Etymology: Spanish language

Location
- Country: United States
- State: California
- Region: Santa Clara County
- City: San Jose, California

Physical characteristics
- Source: Almaden Reservoir
  - location: 10 mi (16 km) west of Morgan Hill, California
  - coordinates: 37°9′56″N 121°49′34″W
- Mouth: Guadalupe River
  - location: San Jose, California
  - coordinates: 37°14′48″N 121°52′16″W
  - elevation: 194 ft (59 m)

Basin features
- Tributaries
  - right: Arroyo Calero

Alamitos Creek or Los Alamitos Creek is a 7.7-mile-long (12.4 km) creek in San Jose, California, which becomes the Guadalupe River when it exits Lake Almaden and joins Guadalupe Creek. Los Alamitos Creek is located in Almaden Valley and originates from the Los Capitancillos Ridge in the Santa Cruz Mountains, near New Almaden. This creek flows through the Valley's Guadalupe Watershed, which is owned by the Santa Clara Valley Water District. The creek flows in a generally northwesterly direction after rounding the Los Capitancillos Ridge and the town of New Almaden, in the southwest corner, before ambling along the Santa Teresa Hills on northeast side of the Almaden Valley. Its environment has some relatively undisturbed areas and considerable lengths of suburban residential character. Originally called Arroyo de los Alamitos, the creek's name is derived from "little poplar", "alamo" being the Spanish word for "poplar" or "cottonwood".

== History ==
The Alamitos Creek banks were inhabited by Native American tribes thousands of years ago and up until the time of Spanish exploration. Evidence of middens and traces of that hunter-gatherer civilization has been recorded from archeological excavations and surface finds. From the mid-19th century until the 1970s, operation of the New Almaden Quicksilver Mines discharged high levels of mercury into the creek near its headwaters and the remaining piles of exposed mine tailings still contaminate the creek beyond natural levels. Warning signs to not eat fish caught in the Alamitos Creek still run the length of its course. In the 1940s and 1950s, rapid residential development expanded into this portion of the Almaden Valley including building which encroached into the 100-year floodplain. The Santa Clara Valley Water District began studying this watershed with emphasis upon flood control functions, and made some minor streambed alterations such as energy dissipators. In 1976 the District developed a comprehensive flood control plan and retained Earth Metrics Inc. to prepare an independent Environmental Impact Report. The resulting study developed the first comprehensive data base of biology, water quality, geology and cultural resources information for Alamitos Creek. In 1989 the city of San Jose undertook an analysis to create a creekside trail from Almaden Quicksilver County Park to a location along Alamitos Creek about .6 mile below the confluence with Arroyo Calero.

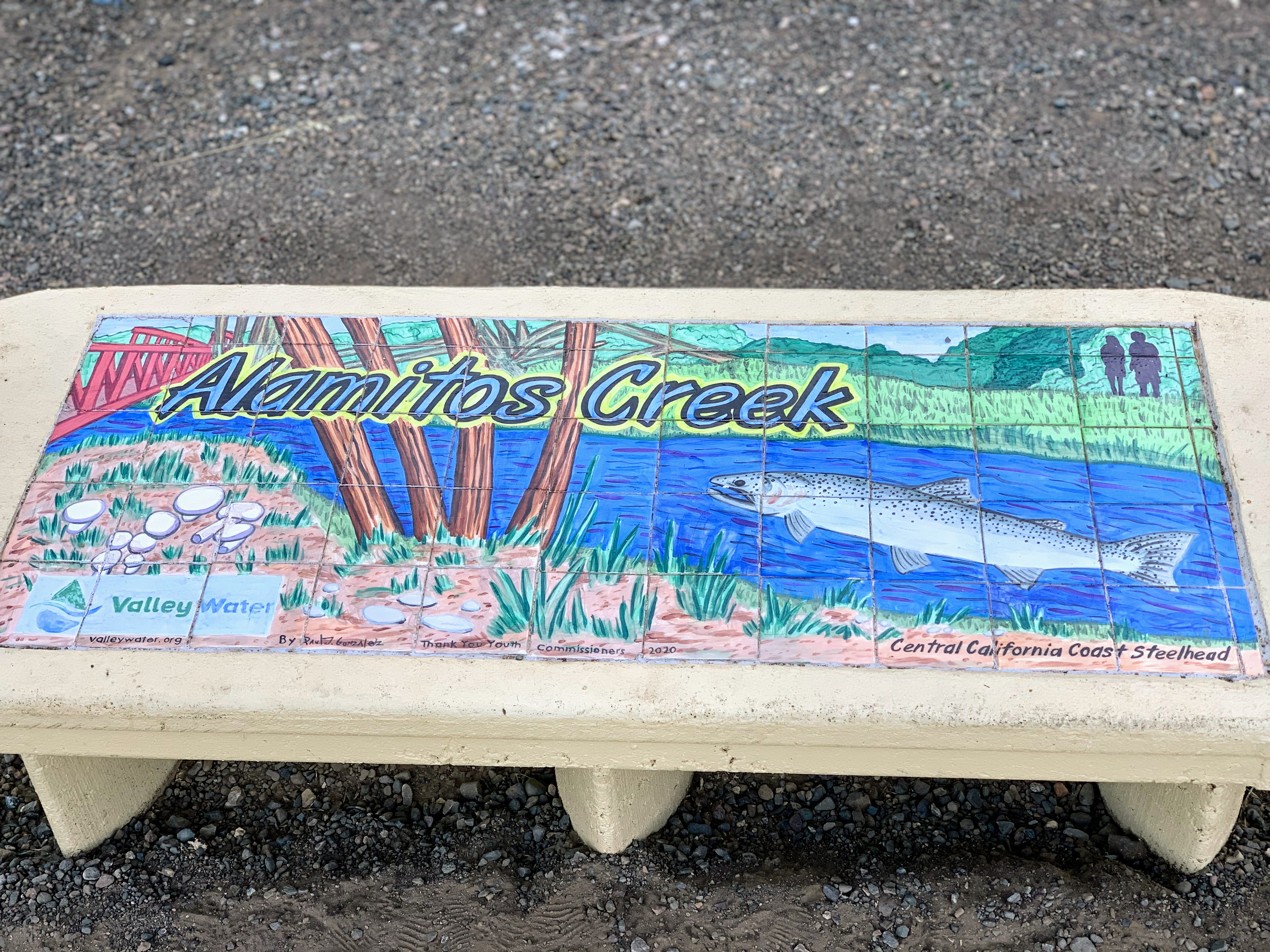
A painting on tiles on a bench symbolizing Los Alamitos Creek's marine life, footbridges & public recreation

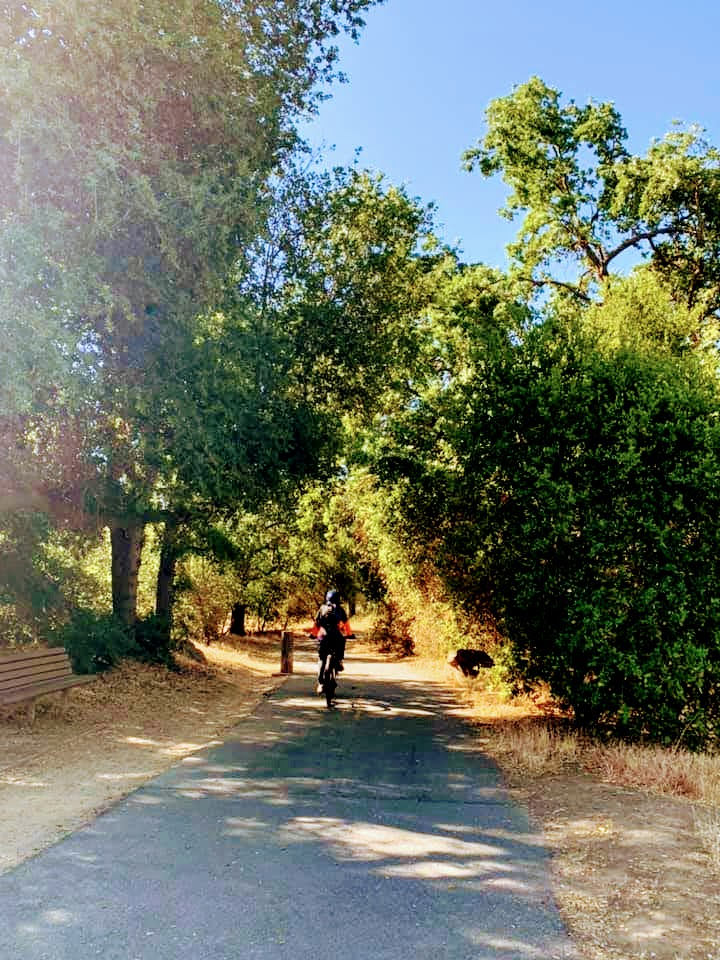
Los Alamitos Creek Trail

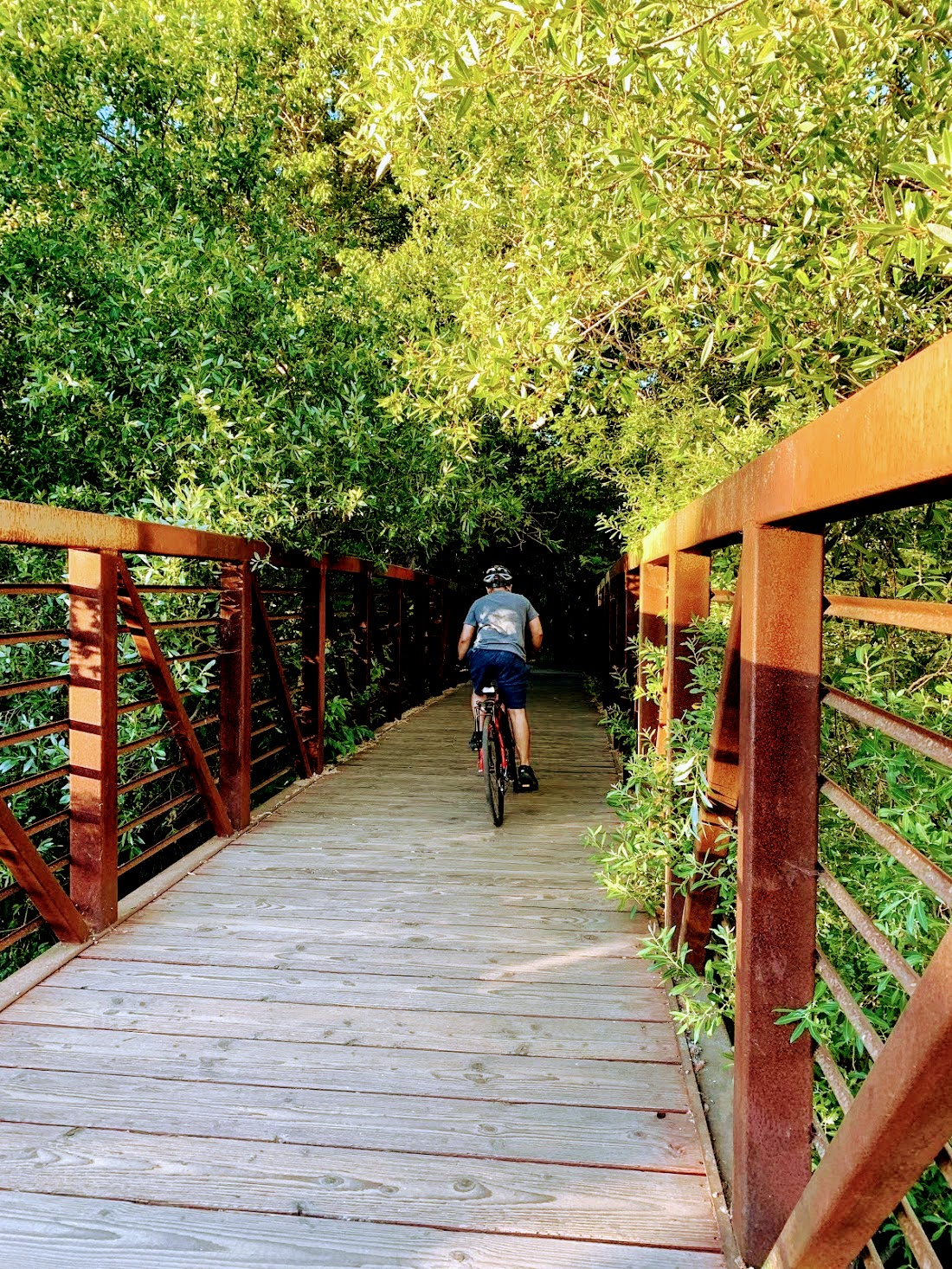
One of the footbridges on the Los Alamitos Creek Trail

== Watershed ==
Alamitos Creek drains an area of approximately 38 square miles (98 km^{2}), and begins at the base of Almaden Reservoir, although the reservoir is fed by Herbert Creek whose source is just south of the peak of Mount Umunhum. In addition to Herbert Creek, the reservoir has several minor tributaries including Barret Creek, Jacques Gulch, and Larrabee Creek. Barret Creek begins in Barret Canyon draining the north slope of Loma Prieta, the tallest peak in the Santa Cruz Mountains, and joins Herbert Creek from the south just before joining Almaden Reservoir. Barret Creek gained significant protection in 2018 when the Peninsula Open Space Trust, the Santa Clara Valley Open Space Authority and the Midpeninsula Regional Open Space District purchased 500 acres of land to preserve as open space. “Rainbow trout in Barret Creek were [once] so plentiful that fishermen used to catch them by the hundreds,” said Vice President Marti Tedesco of the Peninsula Open Space Trust.

Downstream of Almaden Reservoir, Alamitos Creek has another major tributary, Arroyo Calero. Arroyo Calero's upstream reach was dammed to form Calero Reservoir.

Alamitos Creek feeds into Lake Almaden (not to be confused with Almaden Reservoir). Lake Almaden was formed by a private gravel quarry operation which changed a meadow once grazed by dairy cows into the lake. Mercury and Canada goose excrement pollute the lake so that it remains closed to the public. Lake Almaden is a great impediment to native steelhead trout (Oncorhynchus mykiss) migration, as it is home to many non-native predatory fish, such as largemouth bass (Micropterus salmoides). It also serves as a heat sink elevating river water temperatures downstream and creating a large warm lake area difficult for trout to migrate through. Santa Clara Valley Water District is in the process of separating the creek from the lake to address these problems, expecting to be done in 2022.

After it exits the lake, Alamitos Creek is joined by Guadalupe Creek. This confluence is the origin of the Guadalupe River mainstem, just east of Almaden Expressway and north of Coleman Road.

== Ecology ==
Alamitos Creek once supported runs of steelhead. In July and August 1997, the Santa Clara Valley Water District electrofished sites near Alamitos Creek's confluence with Golf Creek near the McKean Road crossing.

In the downstream rocky streambed reaches of the creek there are a variety of birds commonly observed including mallard, black phoebe, common merganser, red-shouldered hawk, snowy egret, belted kingfisher, great blue heron and black-crowned night-heron. There are a few mammals on the lower reaches such as raccoon. Vegetation includes upland tree species such as coast live oak and California bay laurel; understory growth such as coyote brush, toyon and poison oak; and riparian vegetation such as red willow and wild blackberry.

In the extreme downstream reaches rufous-crowned sparrow, California thrasher and American kestrel can be observed on chaparral slopes. In the oak woodlands along the creek, acorn woodpecker, California quail, Anna's hummingbird, scrub jay, oak titmouse, bushtit, Bewick's wren, and spotted towhee can be found.

The California Office of Environmental Health Hazard Assessment has issued a "Do Not Eat" for any fish caught in Alamitos Creek due to elevated mercury.

== Los Alamitos Creek Trail ==
The Los Alamitos Creek Trail or Alamitos Creek Trail is a paved, 4.7-mile (7.6 km) pedestrian and bicycle trail that runs along Alamitos Creek, from Harry Road (south) to Lake Almaden Park (north). As the trail crosses beneath the Coleman Road bridge, it meets the confluence of Guadalupe Creek and becomes the Guadalupe River Trail. A paved trail system which continues along the Guadalupe River extending northward to Chynoweth Avenue. As an alternative to walking under a narrow crawl corridor below the Almaden Expressway bridge, hikers can continue by using sidewalks and the signalized intersection of Coleman Road/Almaden Expressway, trail users can follow the Guadalulpe Creek Trail westward to Meridian Avenue (unpaved, interim gravel surface).

== See also ==
- Almaden Quicksilver County Park
- Guadalupe Watershed
- List of watercourses in the San Francisco Bay Area
- Santa Clara Valley Water District
