= New Almaden =

New Almaden Spanish: Nuevo Almadén
- Neighborhood of San Jose
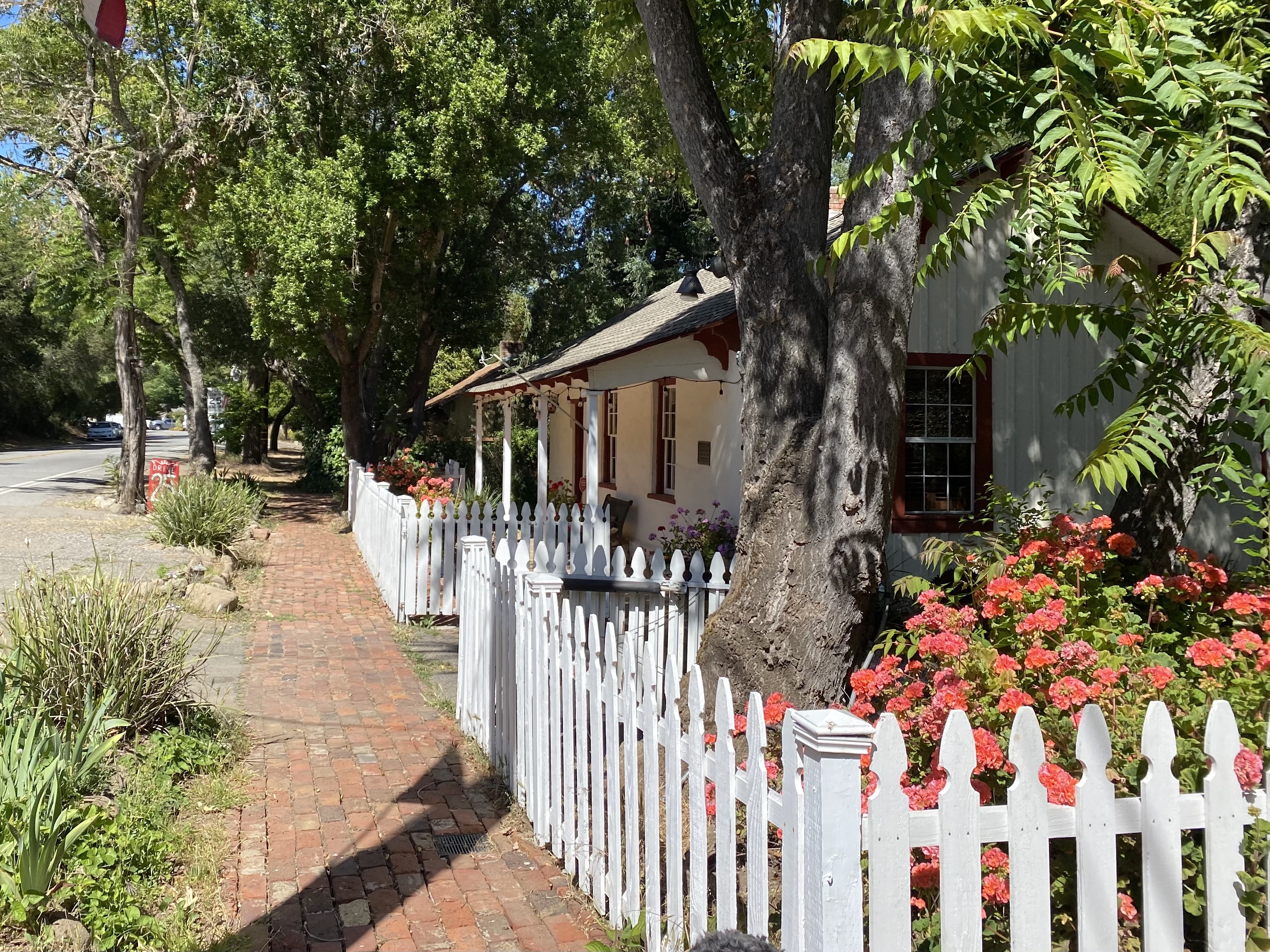
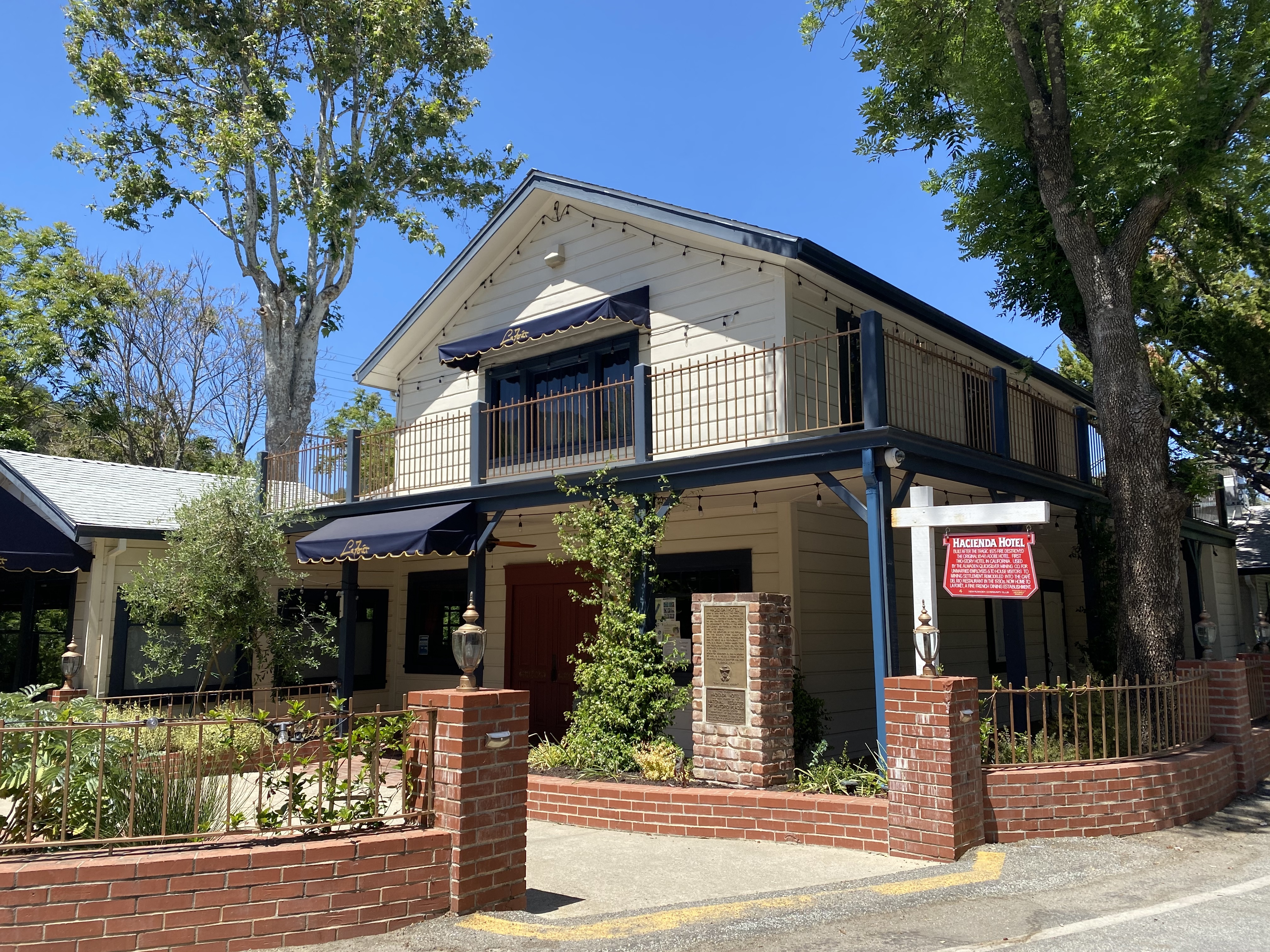
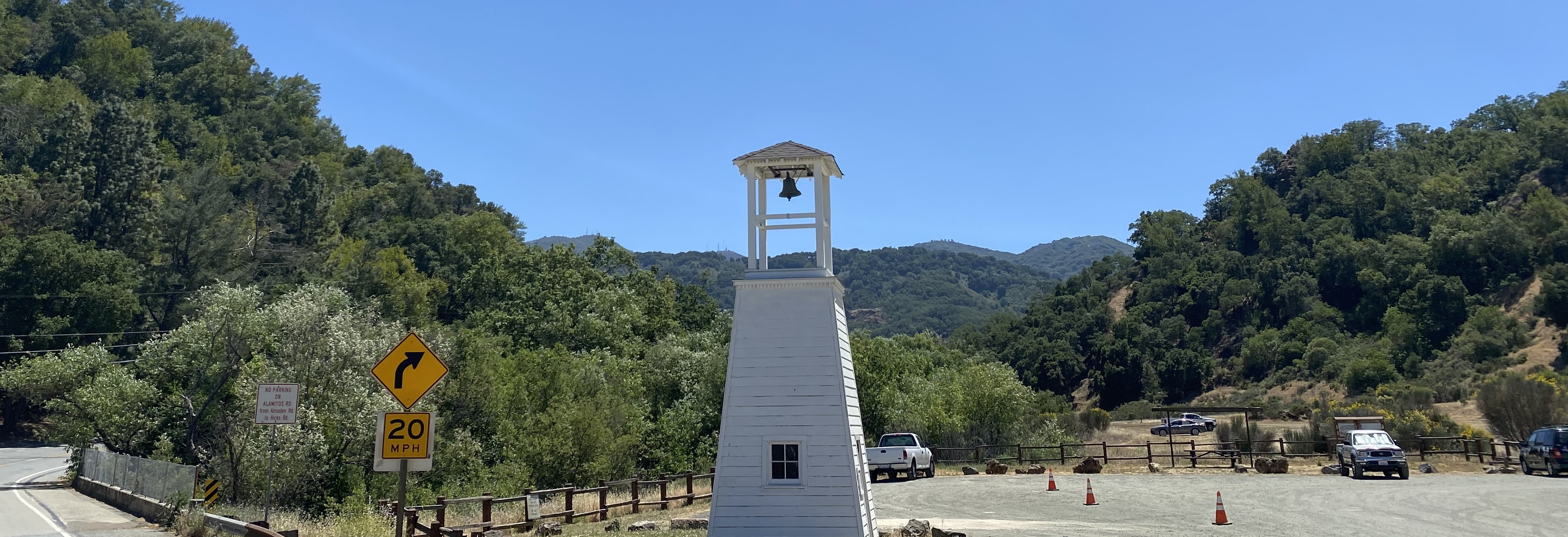
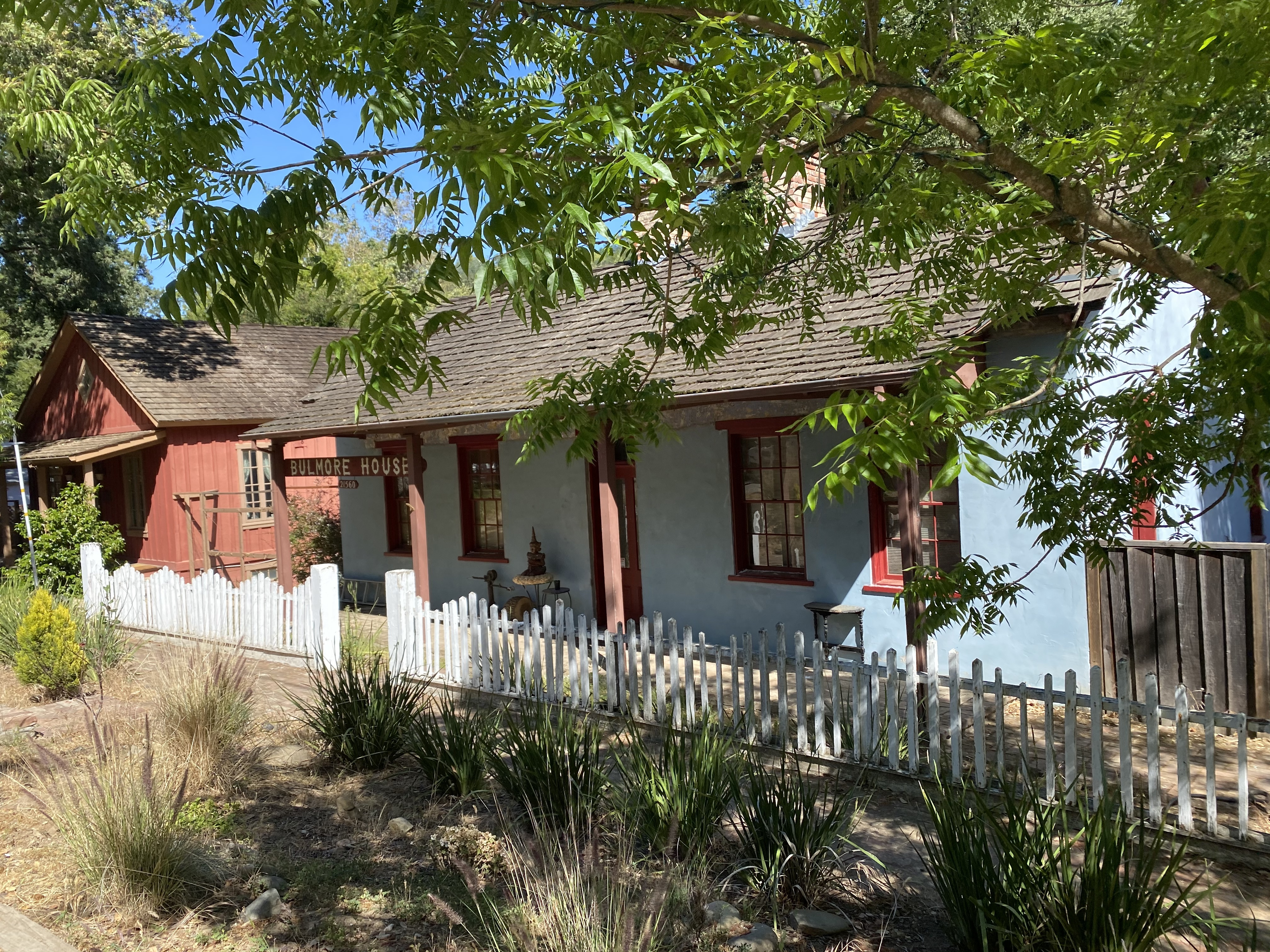
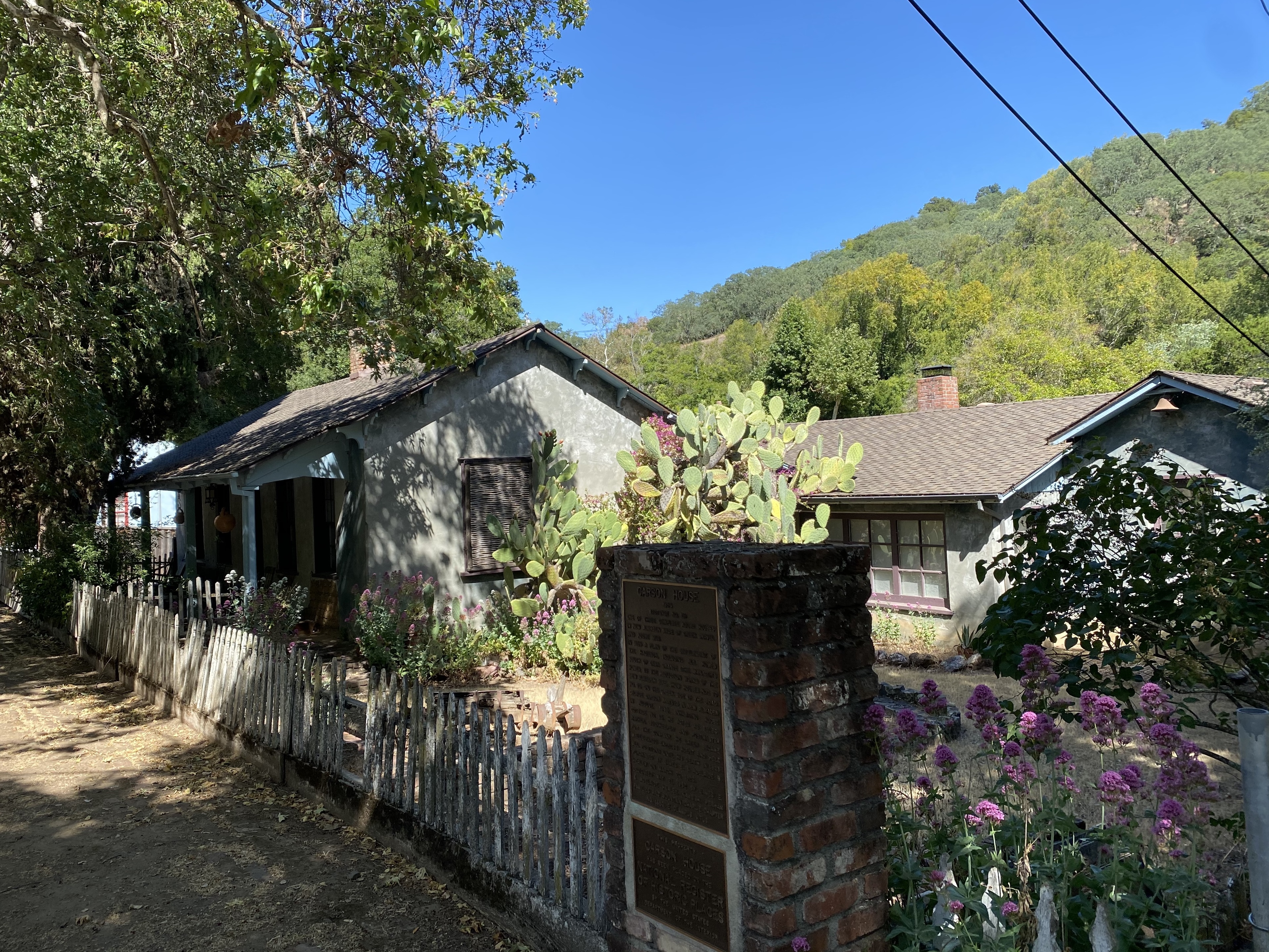

- Location within San Jose, California
- Coordinates: 37.189153°N 121.833269°W
- Country: United States
- State: California
- County: Santa Clara
- Elevation: 492 ft (150 m)
- Time zone: UTC-8 (Pacific (PST))
  - Summer (DST): UTC-7 (PDT)
- ZIP code: 95042
- Area code: 408
- GNIS feature ID: 1659212

New Almaden, known in Spanish as Nuevo Almadén, is a historic community and former mercury mine in the Capitancillos Hills of San Jose, California, located at the southwestern point of Almaden Valley in South San Jose. New Almaden is divided into two parts: the mines and much of their immediate surroundings, including historic ghost town settlements in the Capintancillas, which together form the Almaden Quicksilver County Park; and the largely residential historic district surrounding the Casa Grande.

Discovered in the 1820s by Mexican settlers, the New Almaden mines are the oldest mines in California and were one of the most productive mercury mines in the country. Long before the arrival of the Spanish, Mexicans, and Americans, the indigenous Ohlone people had long utilized the area for its cinnabar, which they used in paint production.

== History ==
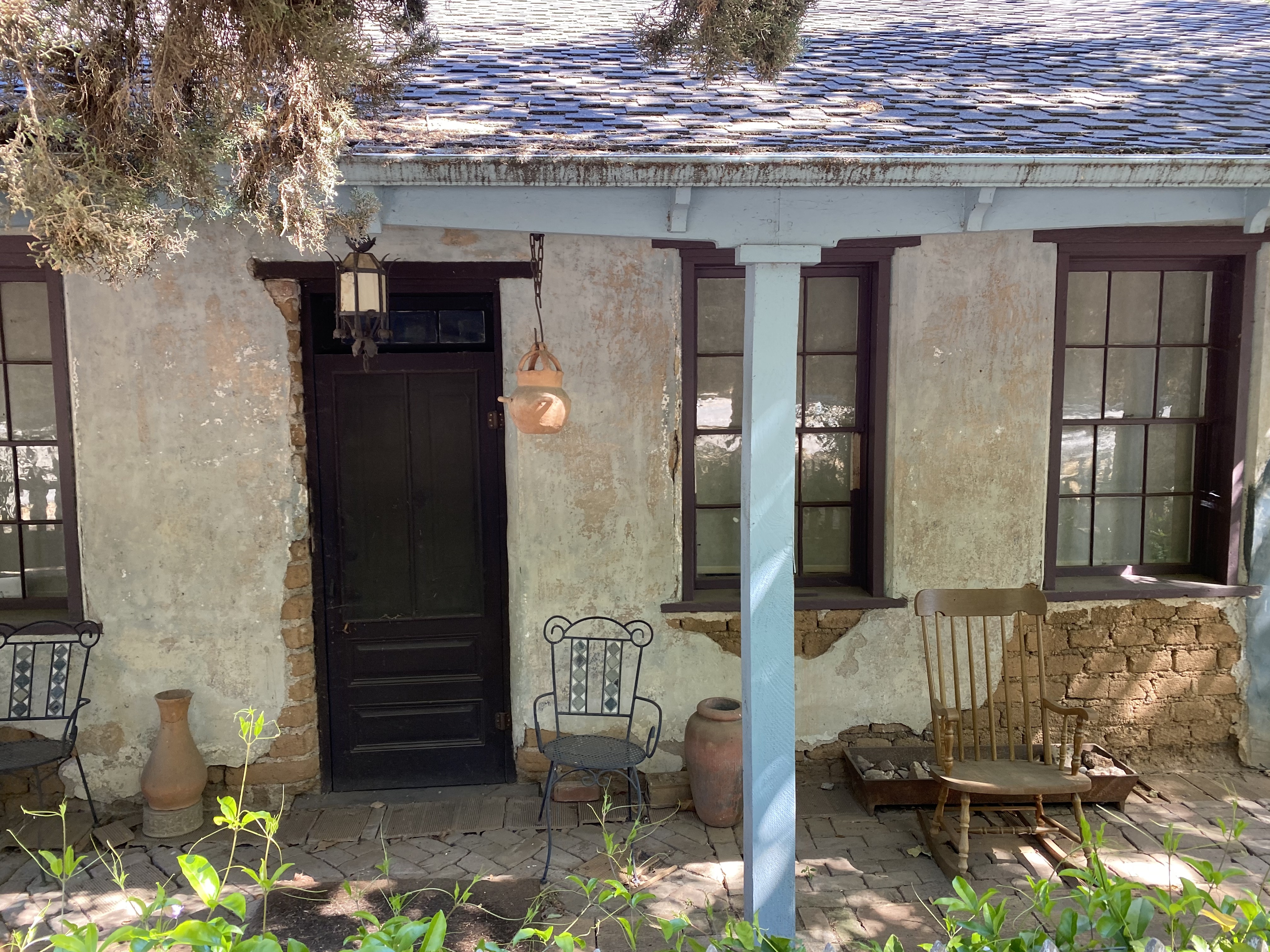
The Carson Adobe, built from 1848 to 1850 by Mexican miners, is one of the oldest buildings in New Almaden.

Cinnabar, a bright red mercury ore, was used by the Ohlone people for paint, but the settlers soon saw its potential to produce quicksilver. The first settler to find the mine was Secundino Robles, who discovered it in 1824, and later owned shares in the mine along with his brother. Andres Castillero, a captain in the Mexican Army, obtained a grant to the mine in 1846 but, occupied with his military duties during the Mexican War, soon sold it to Barron, Forbes Company, an English textile firm based in Tepic, Mexico. It was named "Nuevo Almadén" by Alexander Forbes. Castillero's mining claim was confirmed by the Board of Commissioners that evaluated private land claims in California on January 8, 1856, but there was continued litigation in the District court, The United States vs. Andres Castillero. A claim of fraud was made on behalf of the Quicksilver Mining Company, which had acquired a competing land claim originating in an agricultural claim to the land the mine was on. On appeal to the Supreme Court of the United States the claim was found invalid in a decision rendered March 10, 1863. One of the competing land claims was Rancho Los Capitancillos.

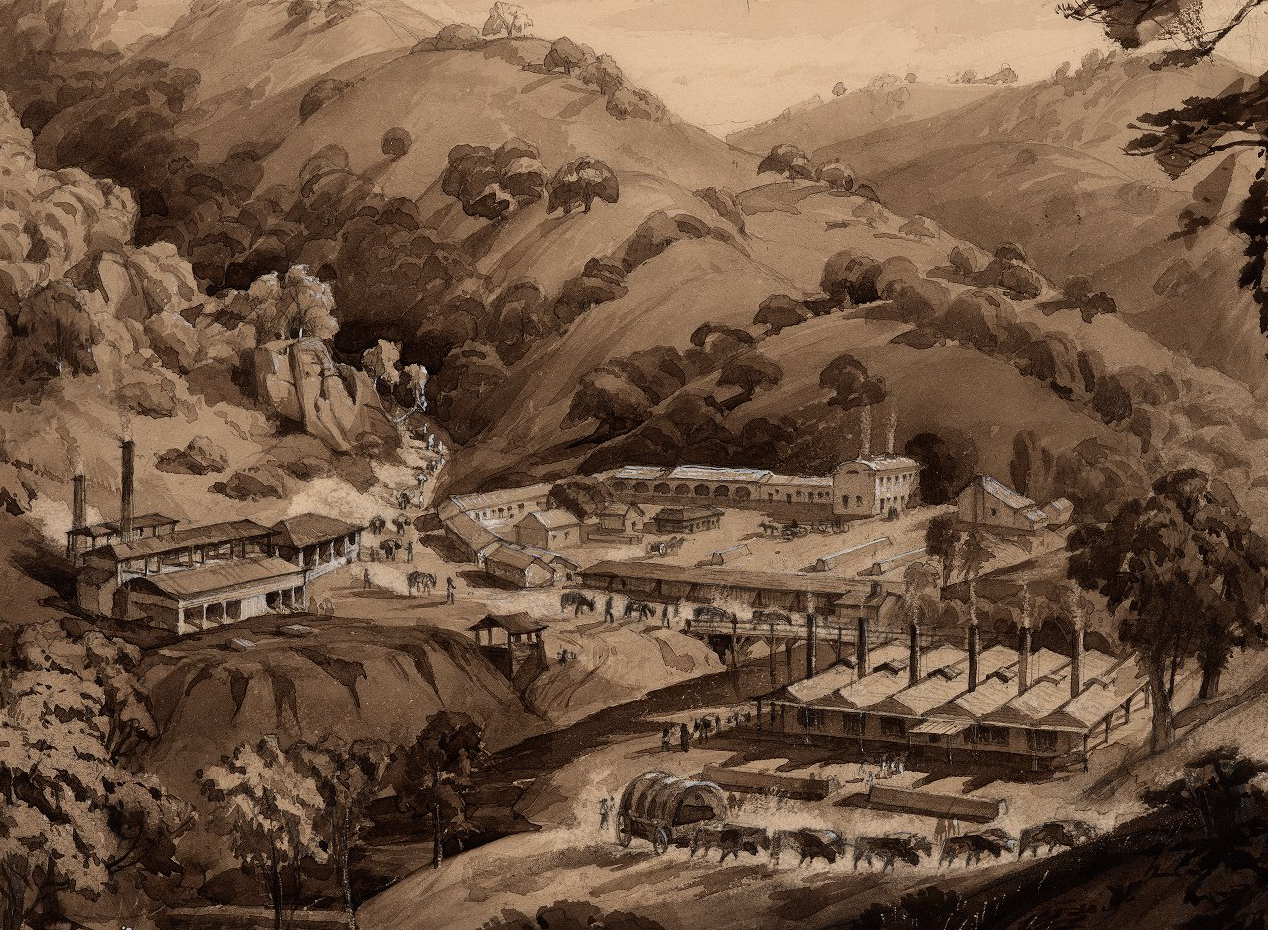
The Hacienda de Beneficio reduction works, shown in 1852.

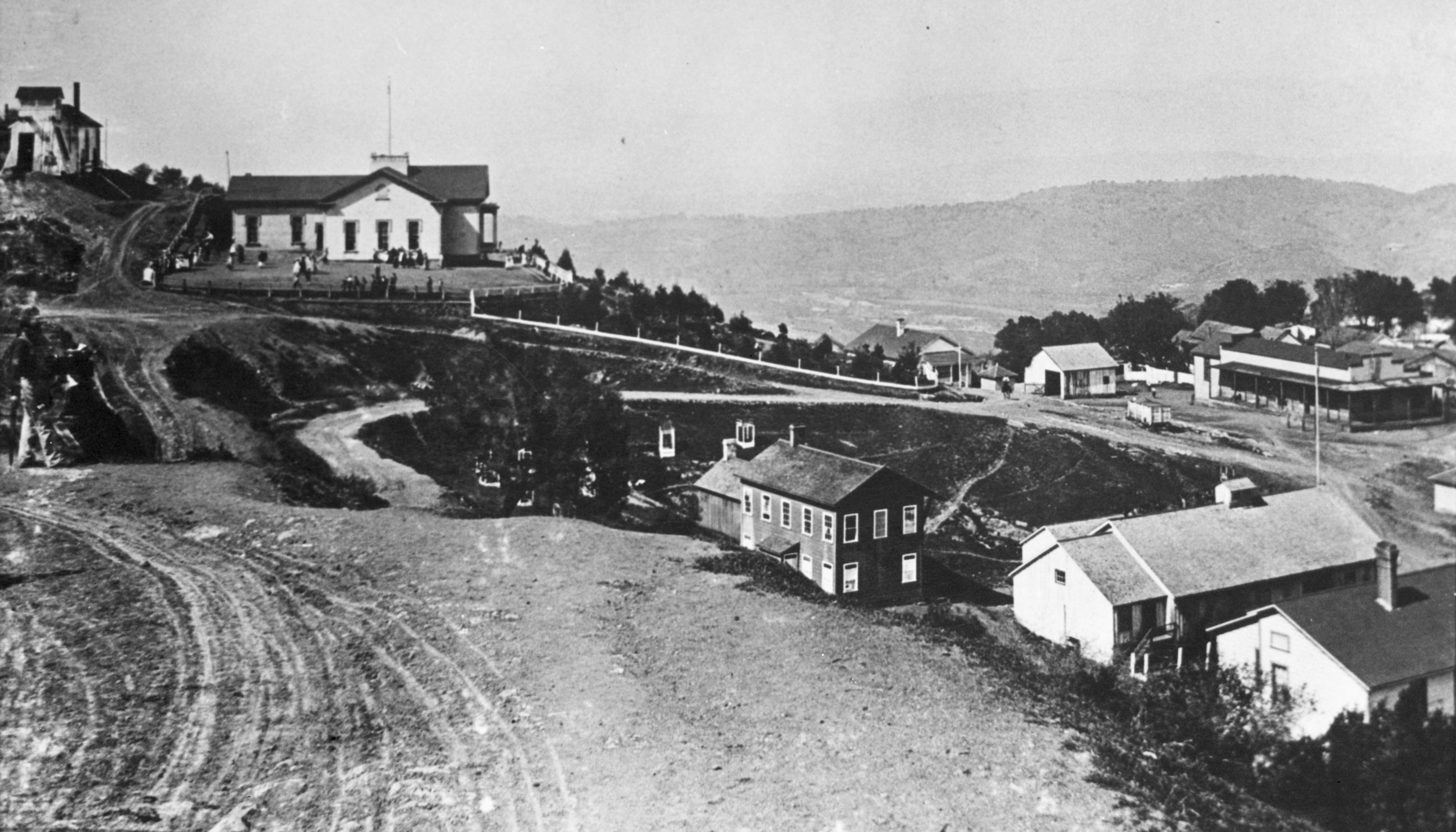
The Mine Hill School, c.1885

The mine is named for a mercury mine in (old) Almadén, Spain, which had operated since at least Roman times. (See Heritage of Mercury. Almadén and Idrija.) The term Almadén, meaning "the mine", is derived from the Arabic language.

In 1863, acting on information that title to the mine had not been proven, Abraham Lincoln attempted to seize the mine, but the federal agent and deputy federal marshal were met at the mine gates by armed miners. Mindful of the possibility of losing the loyalty of California during the Civil War, the federal government backed off and Barron, Forbes Company was allowed to sell it to American investors for $1.75 million.

Arthur De Wint Foote worked at New Almaden in the late 1870s under James Butterworth Randol.

Representations of historical life at the New Almaden Mine were drawn in vivid detail by Mary Hallock Foote, the wife of Arthur DeWint Foote, the resident engineer from 1876. Her illustrated correspondence about New Almaden, "A California Mining Camp", appeared in the February 1878 issue of Scribner's Monthly. New Almaden also features prominently in her memoir A Victorian Gentlewoman in the Far West, which was later fictionalized by Wallace Stegner in his novel Angle of Repose.

== Environment ==
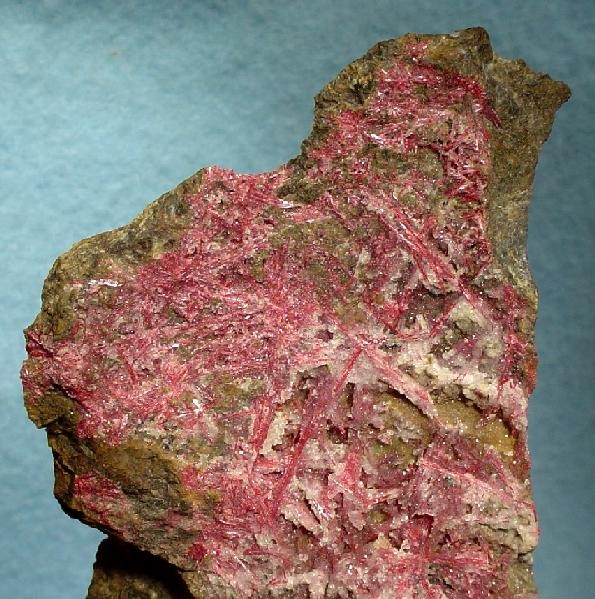
A specimen of Cinnabar (mercury ore) from the New Almaden Mines.

Mining operations resulted in mercury pollution of the Guadalupe River and South San Francisco Bay, impacting birds and aquatic species. In 2005 the responsible parties, which include private companies and local government agencies, agreed to a legal settlement of approximately US$6,750,822 for restoration projects. The California Department of Fish and Wildlife and the US Fish and Wildlife Service issued an environmental restoration plan for the area in 2008.

=== Geology ===
The mineralized area in the Almaden mining district where the New Almaden and the nearby Guadalupe mine are located is within the large Franciscan Assemblage associated with the Coast Range. Quicksilver ore deposited by hydrothermal deposition of cinnabar from deep within the earth is found in a gangue of silica-carbonate rock formed locally by hydrothermal alteration of serpentine. The Guadalupe mine produced about 10% as much mercury as the New Almaden. There are several smaller mines in the mining district, but their ore production was not significant. The only significant quicksilver ore is cinnabar; other sulfides are present in small quantities. Mining, other than a single placer deposit of cinnabar, was underground. There is a high probability of undiscovered high-grade ore which could be found and exploited using modern techniques.

== New Almaden Mines ==
- New Almaden
- U.S. National Register of Historic Places
- U.S. National Historic Landmark
- California Historical Landmark
- Area: 3,200 acres (1,300 ha)
- Built: 1854
- NRHP reference No.: 66000236
- CHISL No.: 339 and 339-1

Significant dates
- Added to NRHP: October 15, 1966
- Designated NHL: July 4, 1961

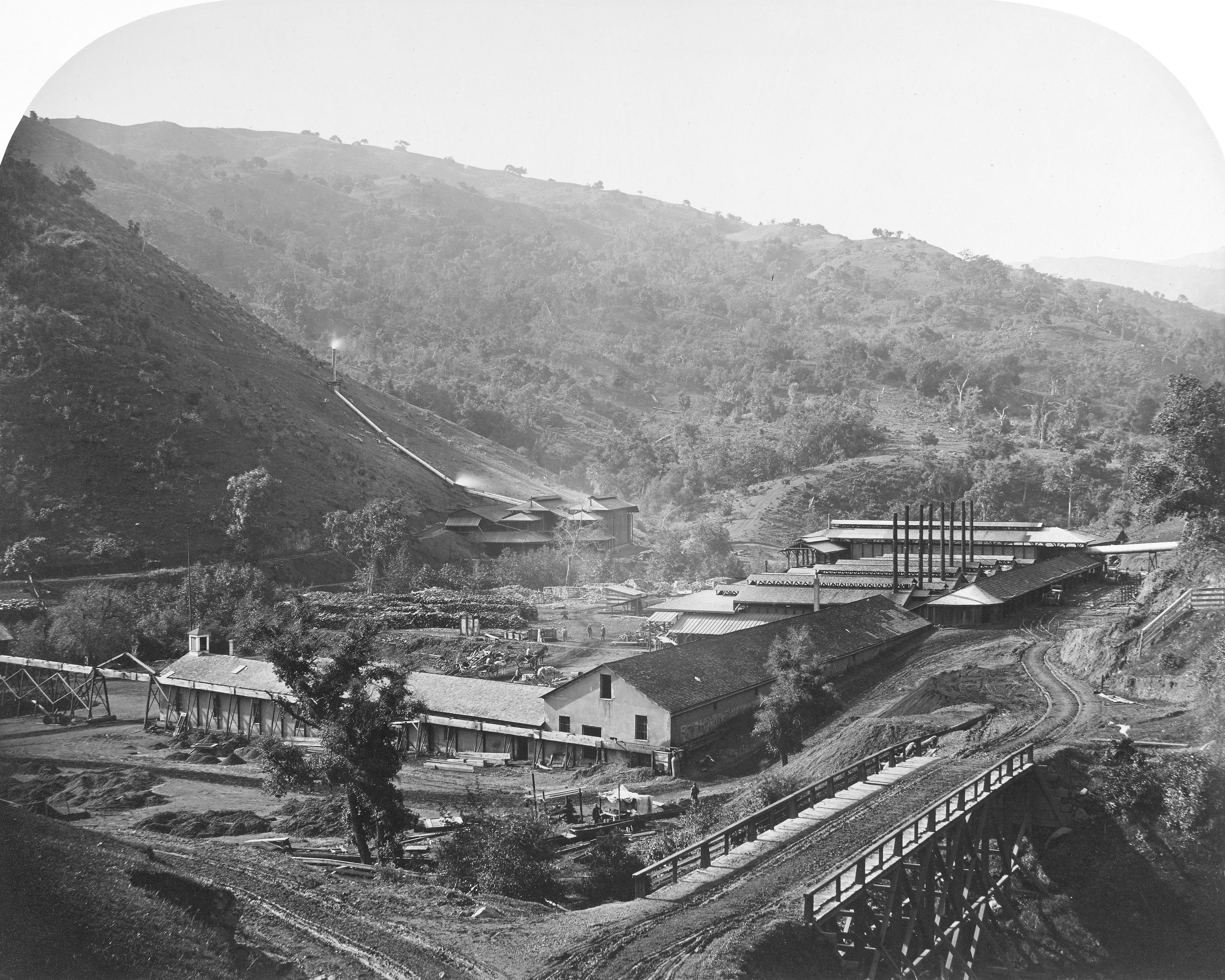
The New Almaden Smelting Works in 1863 (photo by Carleton Watkins).

The entrances to the mines are closed off. After being identified as a Superfund site and after subsequent containment activities, the mining area can now be visited as part of the Santa Clara County Almaden Quicksilver County Park. It was declared a National Historic Landmark in 1961. By the time Santa Clara County bought the mines in 1976 and ended operations, 1,137,727 flasks totaling 83,974,076 pounds (38,090 metric tons) of mercury (worth more than US$70 million) had been extracted.

The remains of a variety of structures left over from the 135 years of mining activity, including housing for the up to 1,800 miners, are scattered about the park, with the biggest concentration at what was known as English Camp, established by Cornish miners in the 1860s. Some structures were built later by the U.S. Army Corps of Engineers and there is a memorial honoring the Civilian Conservation Corps firefighters who were stationed there for a time.

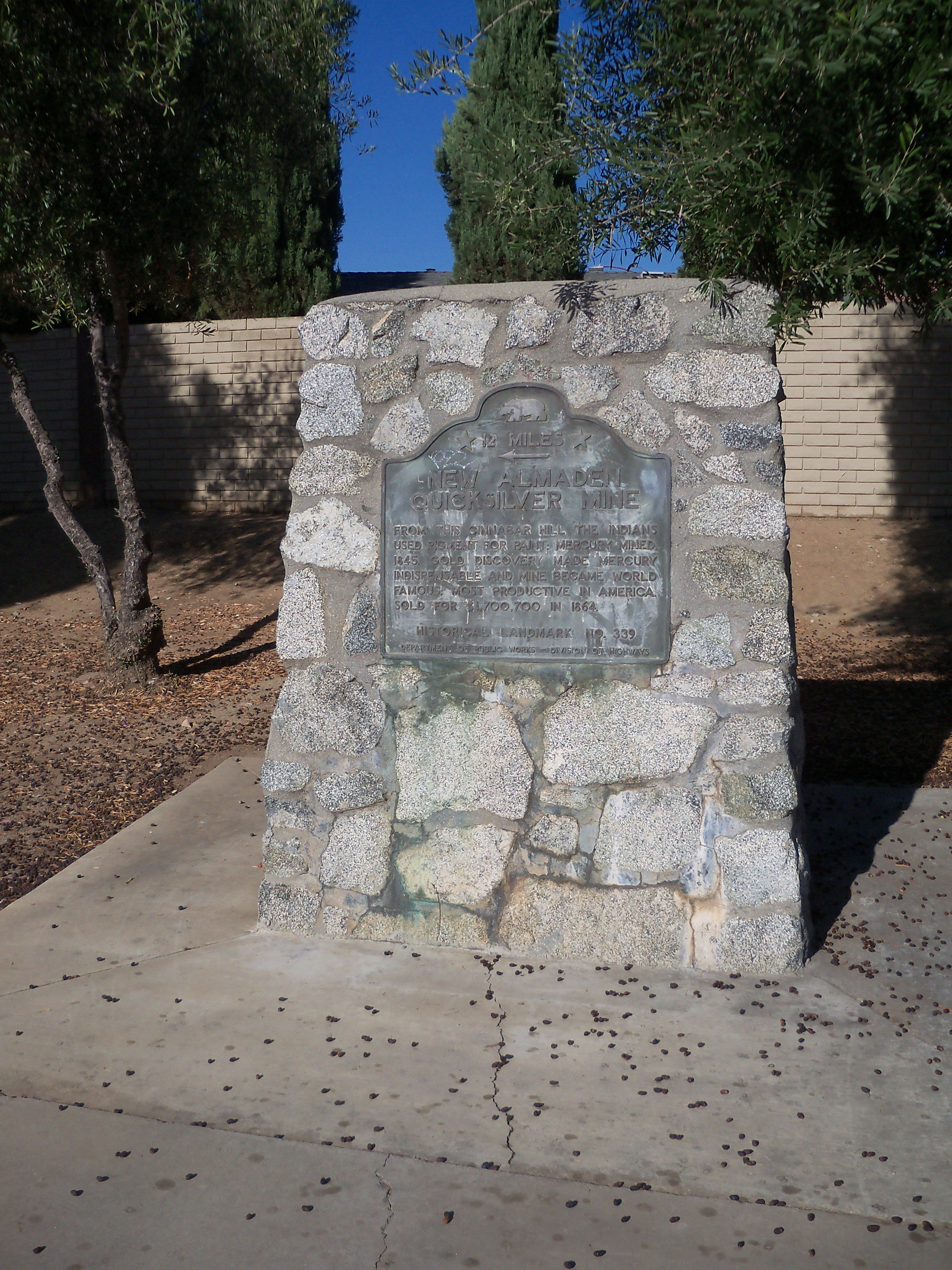
New Almaden Mine

Two California Historical Landmark markers honor New Almaden Mine: #339 marks a cinnabar hill where Indians gathered pigment for paint, while #339-1 is near Arroyo de los Alamitos Creek where the actual mining of ore first occurred.

There is also a museum adjacent at the site.

=== Almaden Quicksilver County Park ===
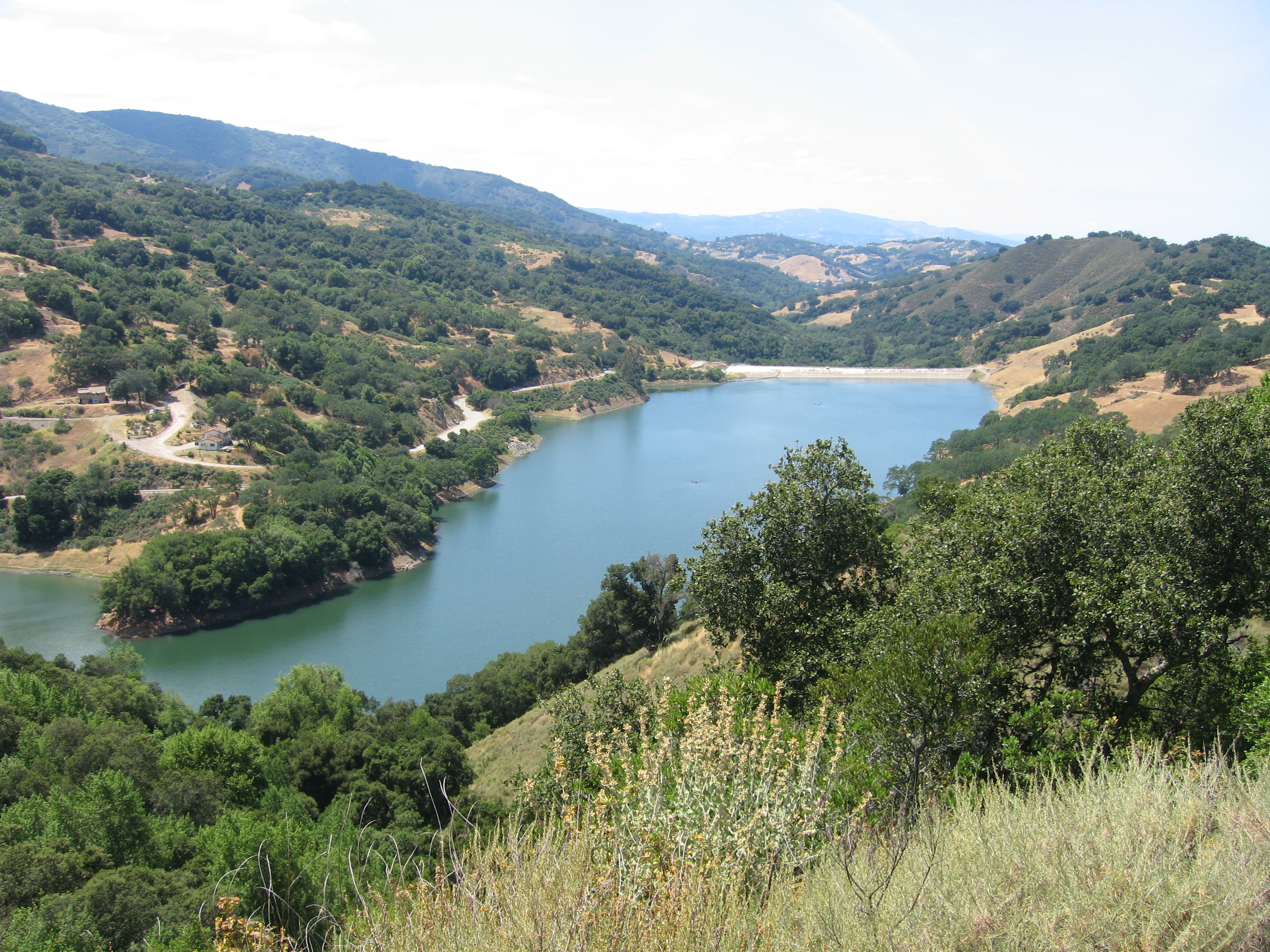
Almaden Quicksilver County Park.

Almaden Quicksilver County Park is a 4,147 acre (17 km^{2}) park that includes the grounds of former mercury ("quicksilver") mines. The park's elevation varies greatly: the most used entrances (on the east side of the park) are less than 600 feet (183 m) above sea level, while the highest point in the park is over 1,700 feet (518 m) above sea level. During the coldest storms of the winter season, it is not uncommon for the high summits to receive a light dusting of snow (which usually melts by noon). The park is owned and managed by the County of Santa Clara and its grounds also include the Guadalupe Reservoir; adjacent to the park is the Almaden Reservoir. The Casa Grande Almaden Quicksilver Mining Museum is located nearby.

==== Conversion from mines to park ====
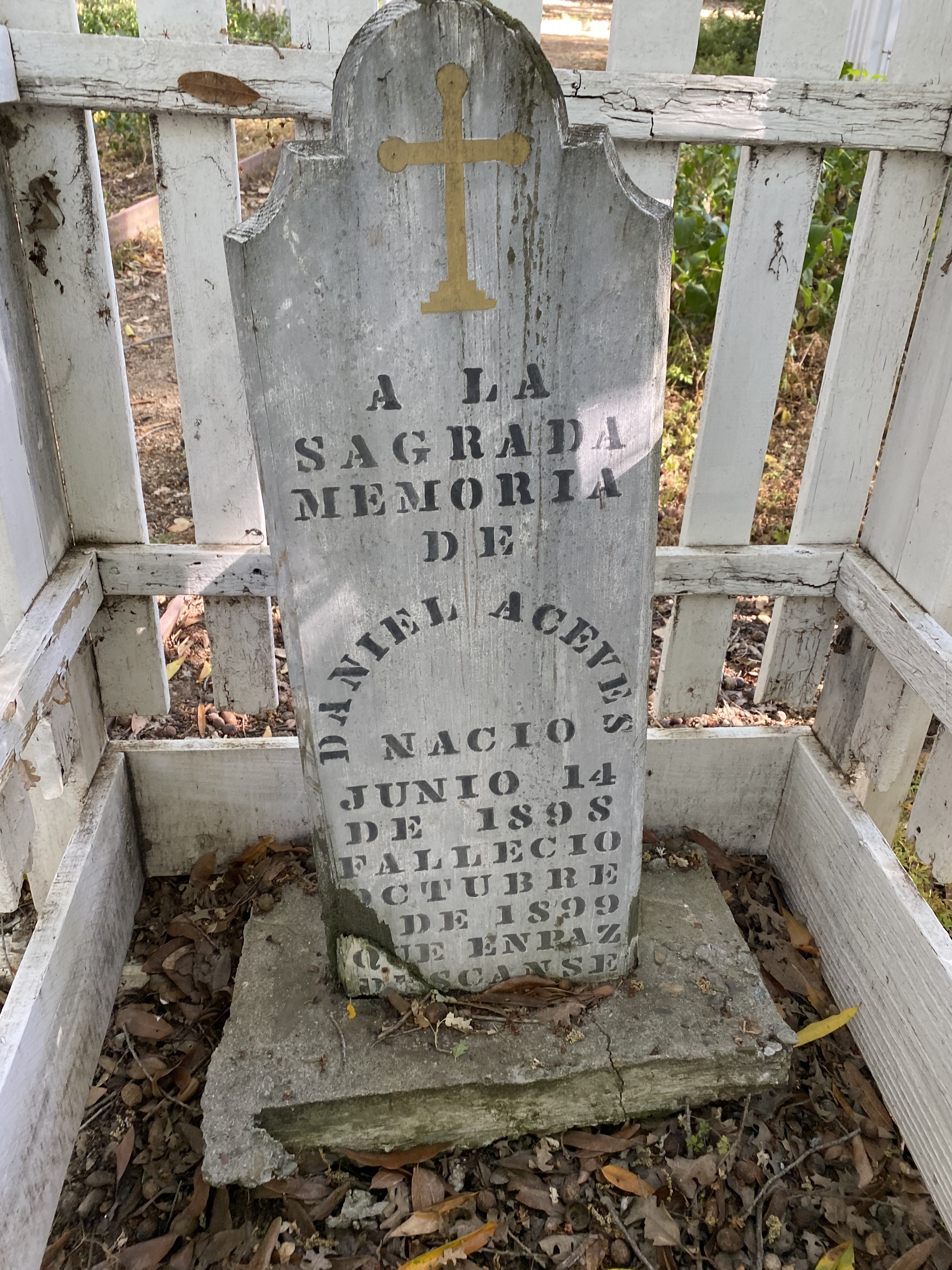
Tombstone in the Hacienda Cemetery.

In the period 1976 to 1978 the county developed a number of new large parks in rapid succession including Grant Ranch Park, Sanborn Park and Almaden Quicksilver County Park. Very soon after buying the mining property in 1976, Santa Clara County began planning for park usage, in an era where the county parks program was aggressively expanding.

The county parks director envisioned a historic park where visitors could experience the mining past and also enjoy the biodiversity of the natural setting. Facilities plans were created and an Environmental Impact Report was prepared.

Principal issues assessed in the park proposal:

- biological impacts upon habitat by park users
- water quality impacts to creeks draining the watershed
- visual and drainage impacts of road improvements
- historical analysis of mine usage

=== New Almaden Quicksilver Mining Museum ===
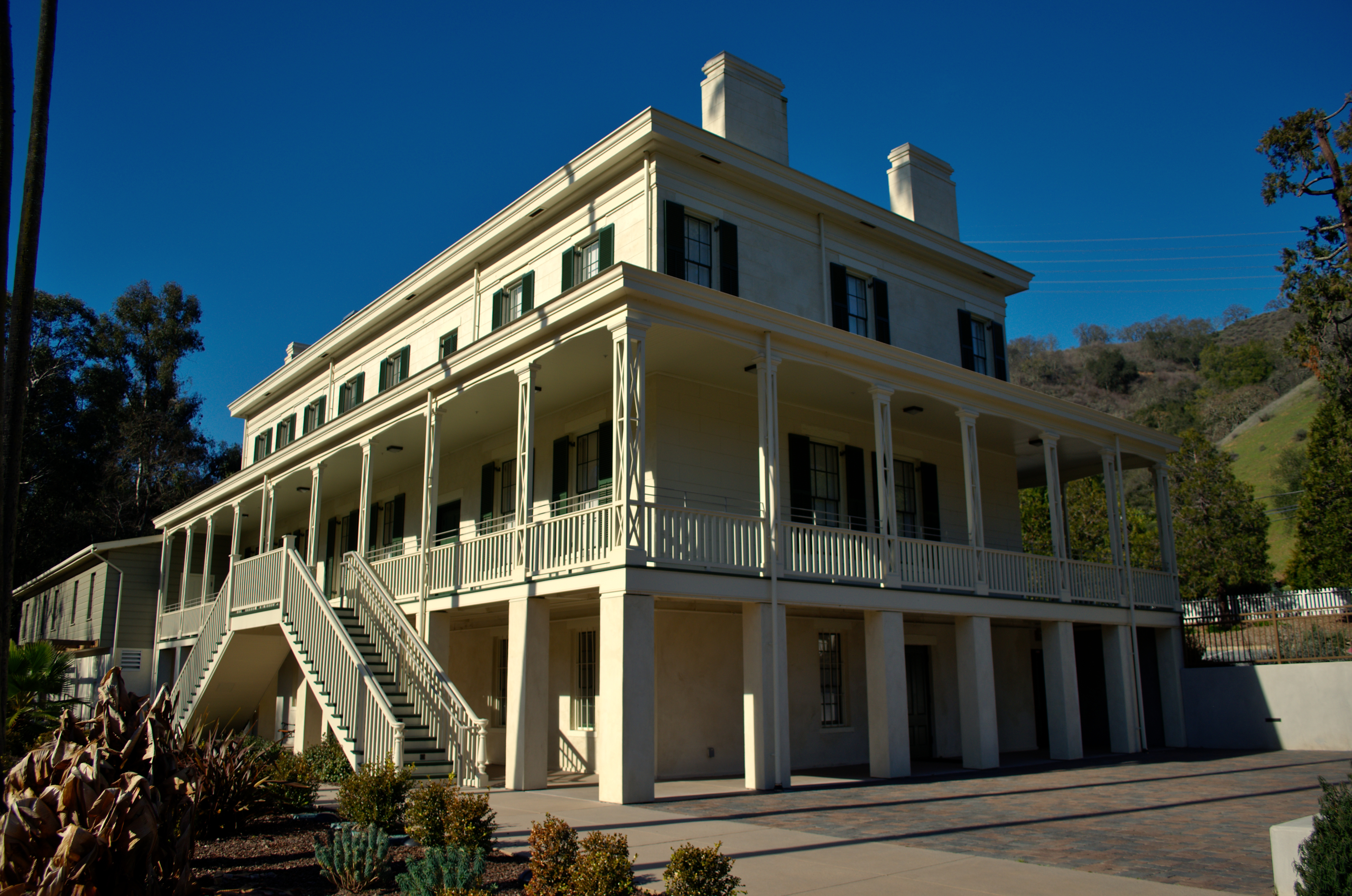
Casa Grande, home of the New Almaden Quicksilver Mining Museum.

The New Almaden Quicksilver Mining Museum is located in the Casa Grande (big house) in New Almaden. La Casa Grande, an 1854 revival-style mansion designed and built by architect Francis Myers, was the official residence and office of the mine superintendents, as well as a country retreat for wealthy mine investors. The mansion now serves as the site of the New Almaden Quicksilver Mining Museum, which contains exhibits about the history of mercury mining and the cultural history of the mining communities at New Almaden. The exhibits include a mine diorama of the interior of a mine shaft, mining equipment and technology, a mine manager's office with period displays, and artifacts from Cornish, Mexican and Chinese mining families.

== Notable residents ==
- Pat Tillman, Arizona Cardinals All-Pro safety

== See also ==
- Almaden Valley, San Jose
- New Idria, California
