= Heritage of Mercury. Almadén and Idrija =

UNESCO World Heritage Site
- Antonijev rov, mine entrance in Idrija
- Location: Almadén, Province of Ciudad Real, Castile-La Mancha, Spain; Idrija, Municipality of Idrija, Gorizia Statistical Region, Slovenia
- Criteria: Cultural: (ii), (iv)
- Reference: 1313rev
- Inscription: 2012 (36th Session)
- Area: 104.1 ha (257 acres)
- Coordinates: 38°46′31″N 4°50′20″W
- Almadén and Idrija in Europe

Heritage of Mercury. Almadén and Idrija is a joint UNESCO World Heritage Site in Almadén, Castile-La Mancha, Spain, and Idrija, Slovenia. The property encompasses two mercury mining sites. In Almadén mercury has been extracted since Antiquity, while in Idrija it was first found in 1490.

The sites bear testimony to the intercontinental trade in mercury which generated important exchanges between Europe and America over the centuries. The two sites represent the two largest mercury mines in the world and were operational until recent times. Mercury played an important role in extracting gold and silver from ores, dug in American mines. In addition, both sites illustrate the various industrial, territorial, urban and social elements of a specific sociotechnical system in the mining and metal production industries.

At the heart of the Almadén site is a Mining Park, where the public can go underground. There are also buildings relating to the town's mining history, including Retamar Castle, the San Rafael Mining Hospital (now an archive), and eighteenth-century dwellings which form a hexagonal bullring.

The site in Idrija notably features mercury stores and infrastructure, as well as miners’ living quarters, and a miners’ theatre.

== Nomination process ==
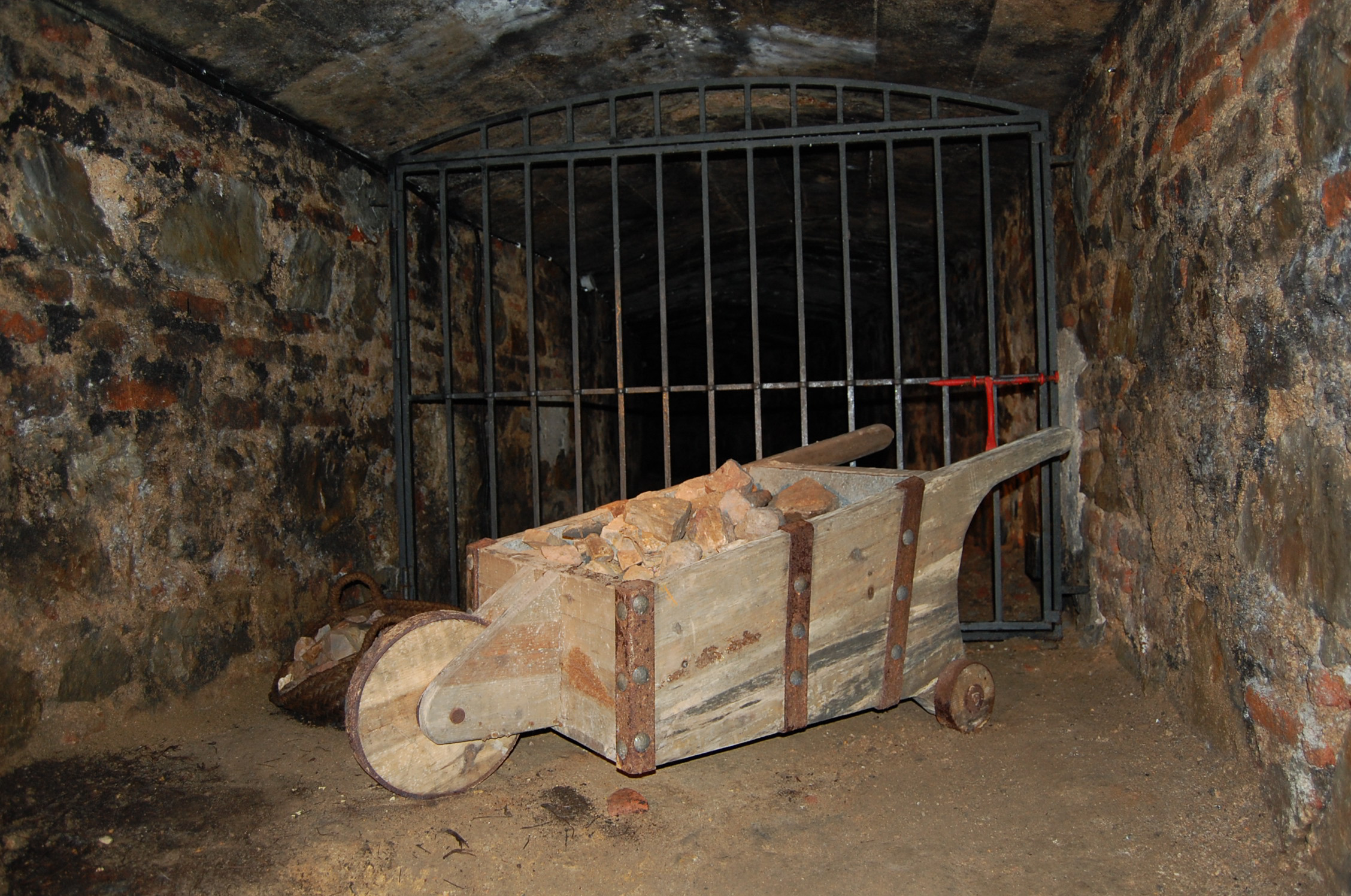
Interior of one of the Almadén's mines

Idrija begun the process to inscribe the mercury heritage to the UNESCO's heritage list in 2006. Initially, the nomination was made together with Huancavelica mercury mine in Peru, in relation to the intercontinental route Camino Real. In the second stage, a nomination focused on mercury heritage in relation to silver mining, together with San Luis Potosí mine in Mexico - however, the nomination did not gather sufficient support. The third, successful stage of the nomination focused on mercury mining in relation to technological and industrial processes that influenced the economical and cultural development of the two regions.

== List of registered monuments ==
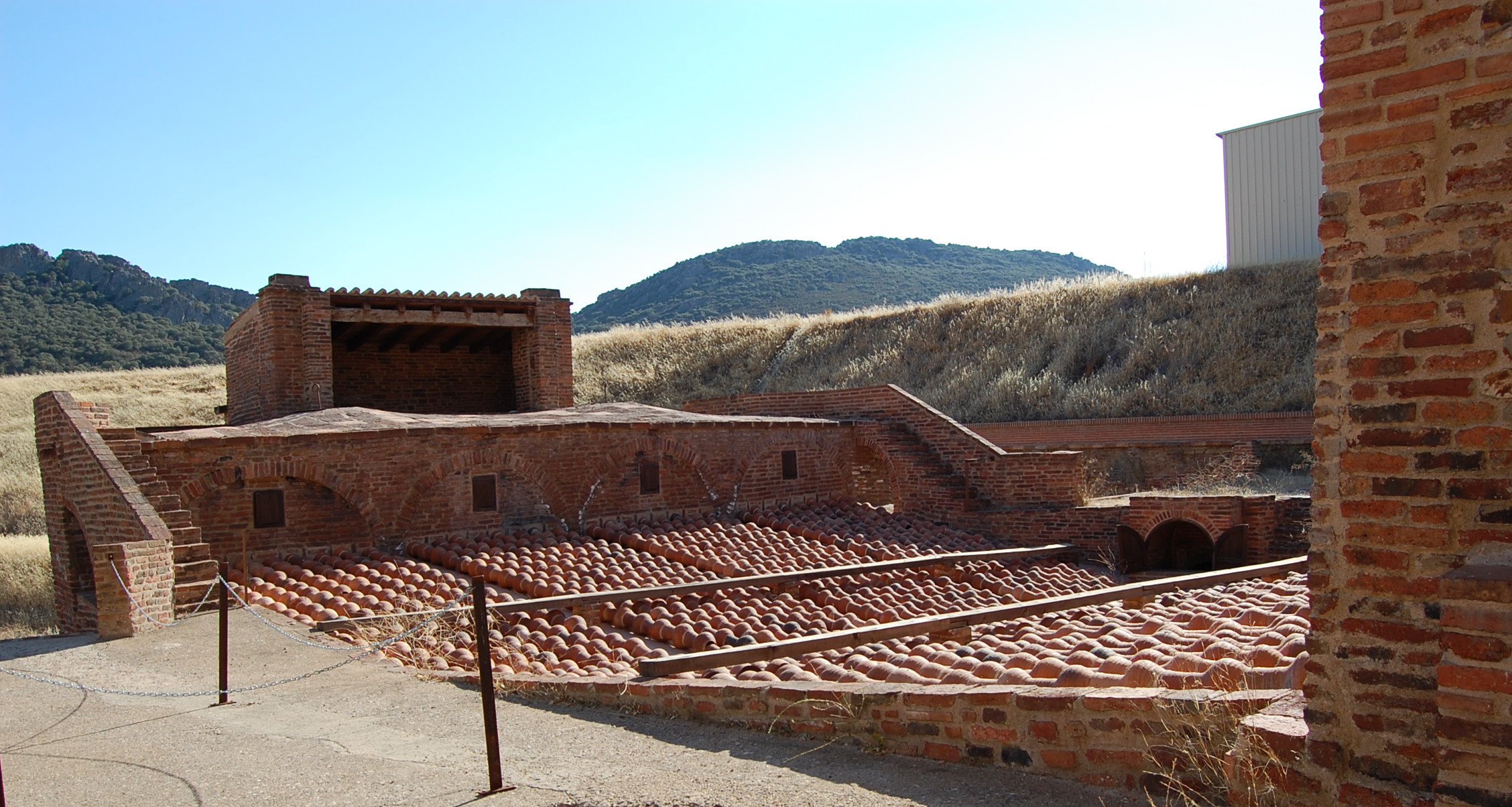
Furnace of Bustamante of the mines of Almadén.

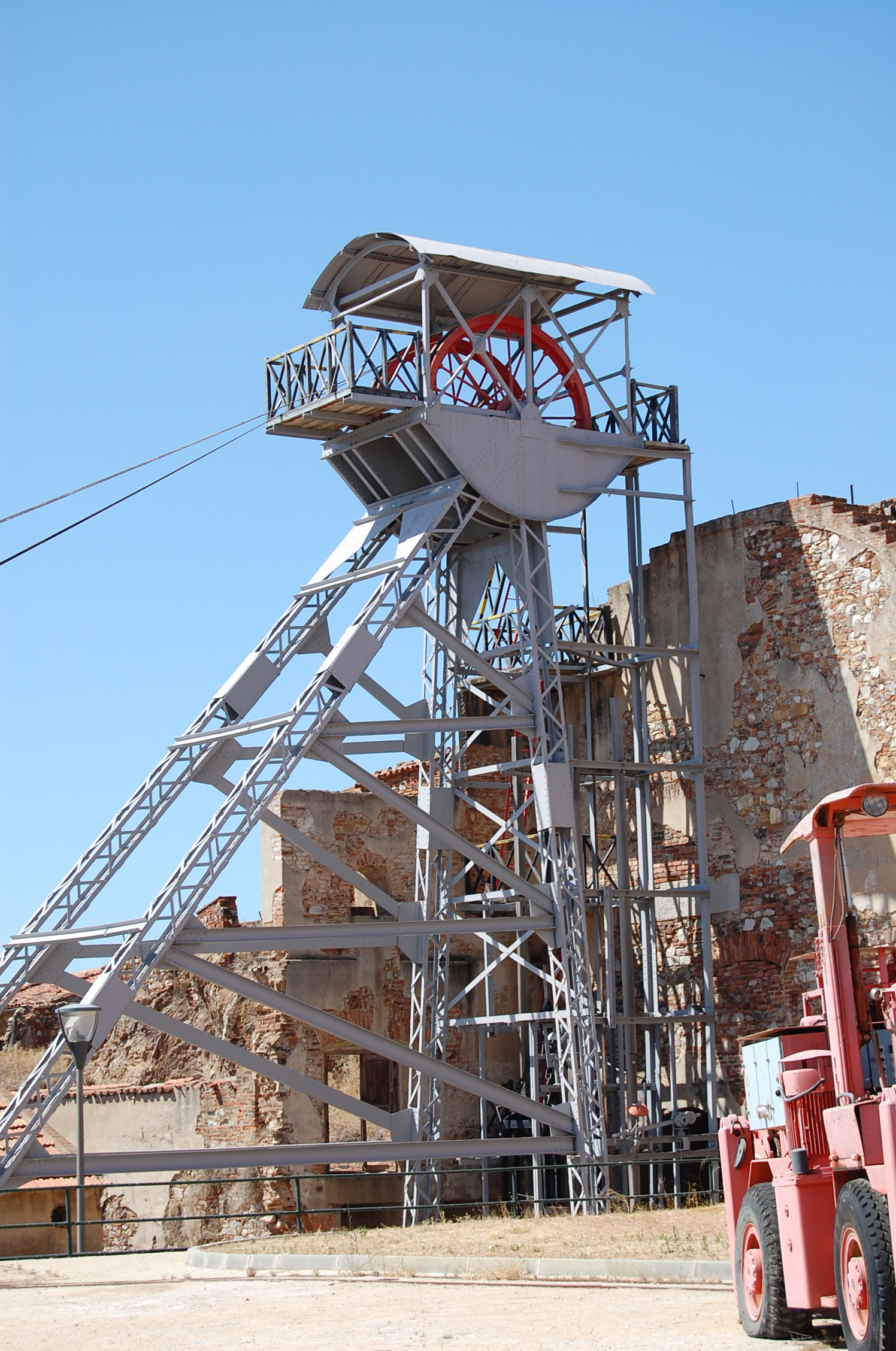
Headframe of the mines of Almadén.

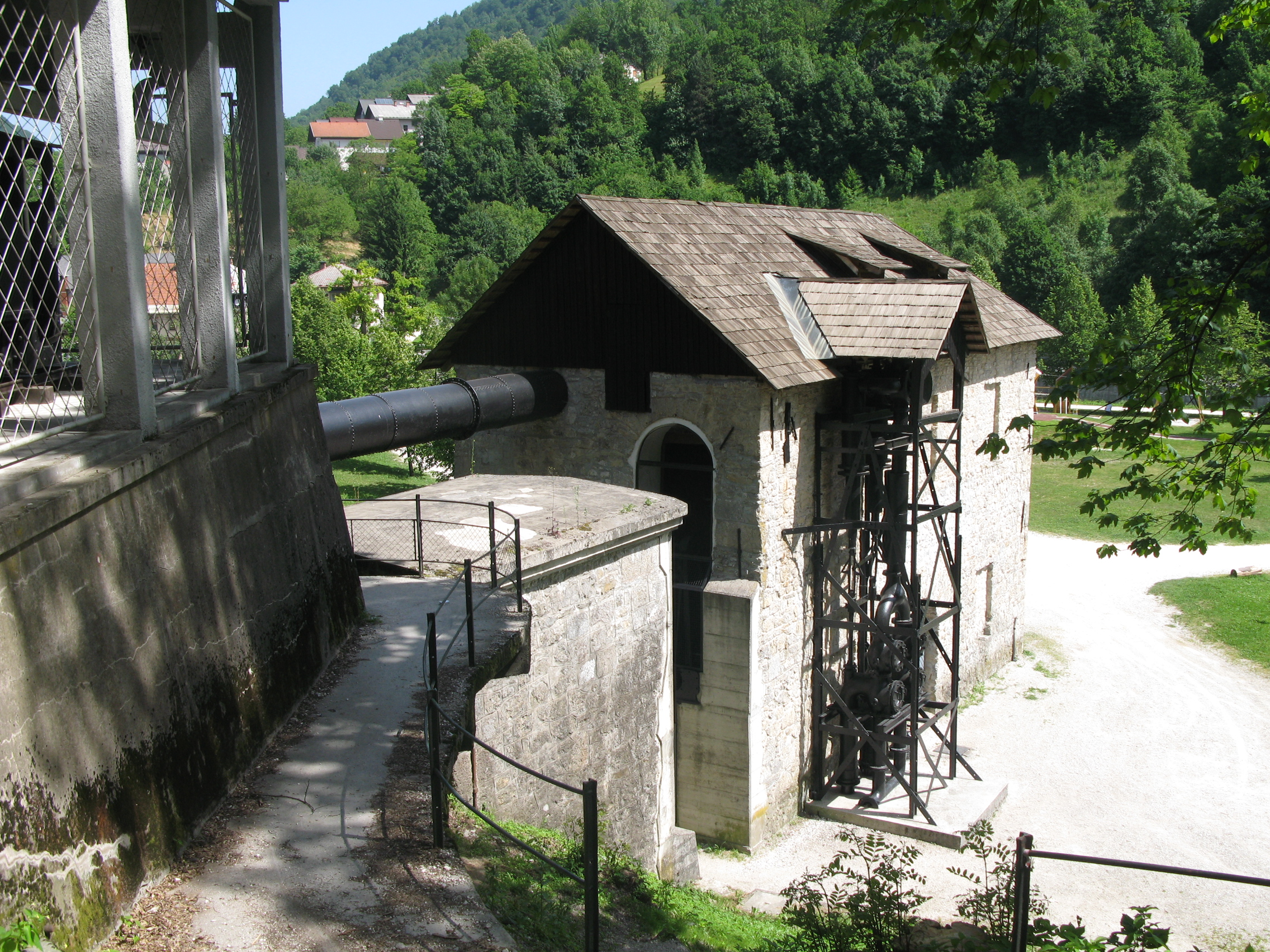
Building of the pump in Idrija.

The elements of the "Mercury Heritage" are the following:

=== Almadén ===
Code	Name	Location	Protection zone	Coordinates
1313rev-001	Old town of Almadén	Almadén	48.98 ha	38.775278°N 4.843611°W
1313rev-002	Buildings of the Castle's Mine	Almadén	0,22 ha	38.772500°N 4.839722°W
1313rev-003	Royal Prison of forced labor	Almadén	0.11 ha	38.771806°N 4.834167°W
1313rev-004	Hospital Real de San Rafael (children)	Almadén	0.10 ha	38.772778°N 4.831389°W
1313rev-005	Bullring	Almadén	0.25 ha	38.775091°N 4.829682°W

=== Idrija ===
Code	Name	Location	Protection zone	Coordinates
1313rev-006	Old town of Idrija	Idrija	47.33 ha	46.000612°N 14.022061°E
1313rev-007	Foundry	Idrija	0.60 ha	46.006944°N 14.031111°E
1313rev-008	Kamšt pump with water channel and tank (Kobila)	Idrija	1.61 ha	45.998889°N 14.030833°E
1313rev-009	Water tank	Idrija	0.71 ha	46.017778°N 13.939444°E
1313rev-010	Idrija Lagoon	Idrija	1.21 ha	46.002778°N 13.920000°E
1313rev-011	Putrih Reservoir on the Belca River	Idrija	0.49 ha	45.976111°N 13.933611°E
1313rev-012	Brus Reservoir on the Belca River	Idrija	2.49 ha	45.970278°N 13.952222°E

== See also ==
- Almaden Quicksilver County Park
