= Almaden Reservoir =

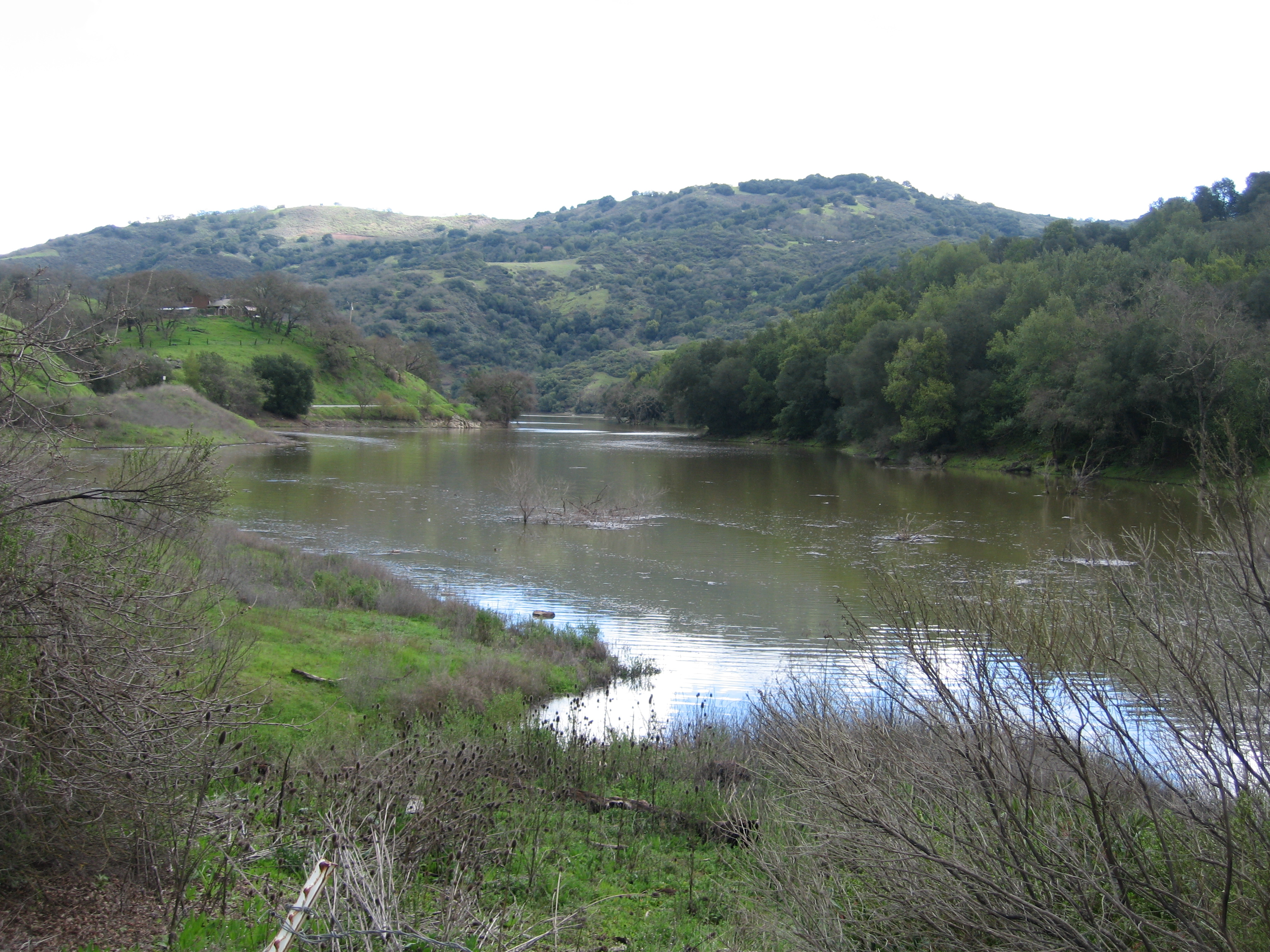
- March 2008

- Location within California
- Location: Santa Clara County, California
- Coordinates: 37°09′45″N 121°50′08″W
- Type: Reservoir
- Primary inflows: Larrabee Gulch, Barret Canyon, Herbert Creek, and Jacques Gulch
- Primary outflows: Alamitos Creek
- Catchment area: 12.5 sq mi (32 km^{2})
- Basin countries: United States
- Managing agency: Santa Clara Valley Water District
- Max. length: 4,000 ft (1,200 m)
- Max. width: 600 ft (180 m)
- Surface area: 62 acres (250,000 m^{2})
- Water volume: 2,000 acre-feet (2,500,000 m^{3})
- Surface elevation: 617 feet (188 m)

Almaden Reservoir is an artificial lake in the hills south of San Jose, California in the United States. It borders on the 4,163-acre (1,685 ha) Almaden Quicksilver County Park, which provides limited fishing ("catch-and-release"), picnicking, hiking, and horseback riding activities. Swimming and boating are not permitted in the reservoir.

The California Office of Environmental Health Hazard Assessment has issued a "Do Not Eat" advisory for any fish caught in Almaden Reservoir due to elevated levels of mercury.

== History ==
The reservoir was formed by the Almaden Dam, built in 1936 (90 years ago) across Alamitos Creek near the community of New Almaden. Its waters reach the San Francisco Bay by way of the Guadalupe River. It is one of the smaller reservoirs owned by the Santa Clara Valley Water District.

== Almaden Dam ==
Almaden Dam is an earthen dam 110 feet (34 m) high and 500 feet (150 m) long containing 250,000 cubic yards (190,000 m^{3}) of material. Its crest is 615 feet (187 m) above sea level.

== See also ==
- List of dams and reservoirs in California
- List of lakes in California
- List of lakes in the San Francisco Bay Area
