= Herbert Creek =

Stream in South Dakota, U.S.

Coordinates: 44°45′54″N 100°57′34″W

Herbert Creek is a stream in the U.S. state of South Dakota.

A variant name was Abear Creek. The stream has the name of Raymond Herbert, a pioneer settler.

== See also ==
- List of rivers of South Dakota
