= Almadén =

- Municipality
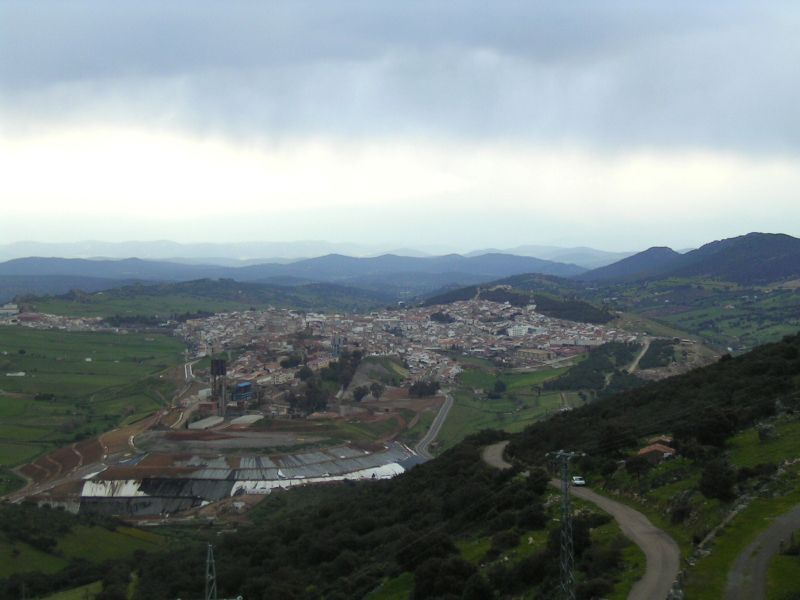
- Almadén in 2007

- Flag Coat of arms

- Location in Spain
- Coordinates: 38°46′35″N 4°50′13″W
- Country: Spain
- Autonomous community: Castile-La Mancha
- Province: Ciudad Real
- Comarca: Almadén (comarca)

Government
  - Alcalde: Carlos Rivas Sanchez (2011)

Area
  - Total: 239.64 km^{2} (92.53 sq mi)
- Elevation: 589 m (1,932 ft)

Population (2025-01-01)
  - Total: 4,855
  - Density: 20.26/km^{2} (52.47/sq mi)
- Demonyms: Almadenense, sa
- Time zone: UTC+1 (CET)
  - Summer (DST): UTC+2 (CEST)
- Postal code: 13400

UNESCO World Heritage Site
- Official name: Heritage of Mercury. Almadén and Idrija
- Type: Cultural
- Criteria: ii, iv
- Designated: 2012 (36th session)
- Reference no.: 1313
- Region: Europe and North America

Almadén (Spanish pronunciation: [almaˈðen]) is a town and municipality in the Spanish province of Ciudad Real, within the autonomous community of Castile-La Mancha. The town is located at 4° 49' W and 38° 46' N and is 589 meters (1,932 ft) above sea level. Almadén is in the Sierra Morena. The name Almadén is from the Arabic: المعدن, romanized: al-maʻdin, lit. 'the metal', 'the mineral' or 'lode', and so by extension, the place where these are excavated, 'the mine'. Originally a Roman, and later, a Moorish mining settlement when taken from the Visigoths, the town was captured by the Christians in 1151 under king Alfonso VII and given to the Knights of the Order of Calatrava.

The mercury deposits of Almadén account for the largest quantity of liquid mercury metal produced in the world. Approximately 250,000 metric tons (280,000 short tons) of mercury have been produced there in the past 2000 years. Due to the toxicity of mercury and its byproducts to humans, the mine has variously employed penal labour, slave labour, and prisoners of war over its long history. Almadén mine stopped working in 2002, due to the European mercury mining prohibition. In 2006, the mine opened to the public who can visit the first level, 50 metres (160 ft) underground.

In 2012, Almadén and Idrija (Slovenia) were declared World Heritage Sites, with the nomination "Heritage of Mercury".

== History of the mines ==
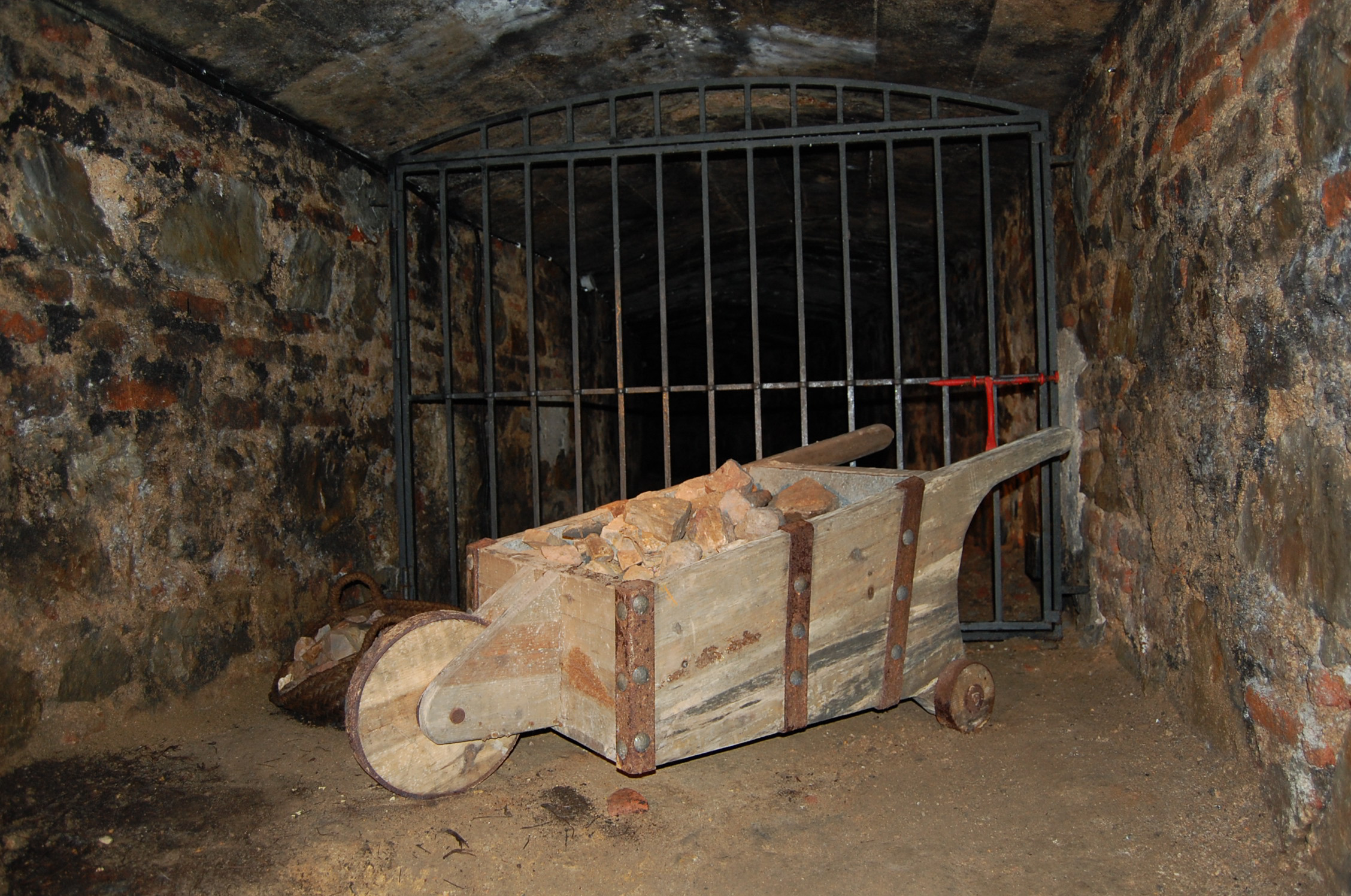
Almadén mine

The geology of the area is characterised by volcanism. Almadén is home to the world's greatest reserves of cinnabar, a mineral associated with recent volcanic activity, from which mercury is extracted. From antiquity, cinnabar was used to make the pigment vermillion and this is the likely end-use of the mineral extraction of Almadén of the Roman and Visigothic periods, for which times historical records are limited. In the Islamic era, furnaces capable of extracting mercury from the cinnabar were installed. With the more advanced expertise available to the alchemists of Al-Andalus, the mines of Almadén exported mercury throughout the entire Mediterranean basin. They were important enough to be described in the learned literature of the day.

The Fugger family of Augsburg, two German bankers, administered the mines during the 16th and 17th centuries in return for loans to the Spanish government. Mercury became very valuable in the Americas in the mid-16th century due to the introduction of amalgamation, a process that uses mercury to extract metals from gold and silver ore. The demand for mercury grew, and so did the town's importance as a center of mining and industry. Most of the mercury produced at this time was sent to Seville, then to the Americas.

The dangerous working conditions of the mines made it difficult for the Fuggers to find willing laborers. As the demand for mercury grew, convict labor was introduced.

=== Convict labor ===
After the Fuggers failed to meet production quotas in 1566, the King of Spain agreed to send 30 prisoners to serve their sentences as laborers at Almadén. The first group of forzados arrived at Almadén at the end of February 1566. The number was increased to 40 in 1583. The prisoners, known as forzados, were selected from criminals waiting for transport to the galleys in the jail of Toledo. Those selected usually had limited sentences and good physical abilities. Murderers and capital criminals were rarely selected, as the galleys were considered a far harsher punishment than the mines of Almadén.

==== Daily life ====
A steady run of complaints to the king in the 1580s led to an investigation of convict living conditions at Almadén in 1593. The investigation was conducted by royal commissioner and author Mateo Alemán and was based largely on convict interviews.

The mine at Almadén provided forzados with acceptable living conditions. Each convict received daily rations of meat, bread, wine. Each year, a forzado was issued a doublet, one pair of breeches, stockings, two shirts, one pair of shoes, and a hood. Medical care was available at the infirmary, and the mine even housed its own apothecary.

Despite these positive offerings, the danger of death or sickness from mercury poisoning was always present. Twenty-four percent of convicts at Almadén between 1566 and 1593 died before their release dates, most often because of mercury poisoning. Nearly all prisoners experienced discomfort due to mercury exposure. Common symptoms included severe pains in any part of the body, trembling limbs, and loss of sanity. Most of the men at the furnaces died from poisoning.

Forzados were also forced to bail water out of the mines. These men escaped the dangers of mercury exposure but suffered exhaustion on a daily basis. A group of four men had to bail out 300 buckets of water without rest. Those that could not meet this quota were whipped. Sick prisoners were not exempt from this practice.

Death was common, and the convicts wished to provide a proper burial for each of the men that died at the mine. A religious confraternity was formed, conducted by a prior who was administrator of the mine for the Fuggers. The prior also chose devout convicts to serve as officials. Mass was held on Sundays and feast days, and non-attendance was punishable by fine.

=== Slave labor ===
People abducted for slavery, mainly from North Africa, were purchased directly from slaveholders to work alongside the convicts. The enslaved people purchased to work in the mines at Almadén were those considered less desirable, unwanted by their slaveholders for various reasons ("rebelliousness", for example), so were much cheaper than others on the market at the time. Such were the dangers of the work and the likelihood of early death, that purchasing enslaved people at the usual market price would have been uneconomic. By 1613, the enslaved outnumbered forzados by a two-to-one ratio.

=== From 1645 ===
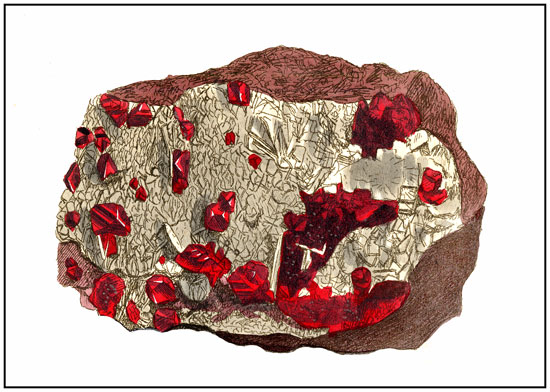
Cinnabar from Almadén, hand-colored copper-plate engraving by James Sowerby, 1811

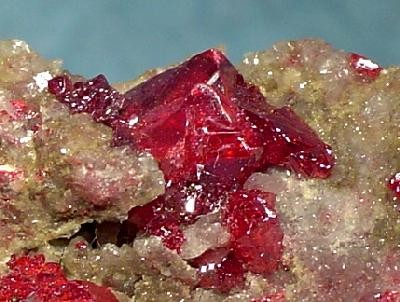
Cinnabar from Almadén

In 1645, the Fugger concession was cancelled and the mines were taken over by the state, to be managed by the royal government. All capital criminals were to be sent to Almadén by court order in 1749, but the mine simply could not accommodate all of them. The act was cancelled in 1751.

Two disastrous fires occurred in 1775 that were blamed on the forzados.

Safer mining technology was introduced in the last quarter of the 18th century, and free laborers began to take an interest in the mine again. By the end of the century, free workers had replaced most of the slave labor. The penal establishment at Almadén was closed in 1801.

In 1835, during the First Carlist War, the mine was leased indefinitely to the bank of N M Rothschild & Sons. The price paid was high, but one of the Rothschild family firms had previously purchased the quicksilver mine in Idrija (now in Slovenia) from Austria; thus the firm had a monopoly on quicksilver, until the discovery of New Almaden in California. Volume was expanded and the metal sold at a substantial markup returning a substantial profit to both Spain and the firm. Spain reclaimed the mine in 1863.

In 1916, a special council was created to operate the mines, introducing new technology and safety improvements. A record production of 82,000 mercury flasks (6.232 million lb or 2,827 t) was reached in 1941, just after the Spanish Civil War, using prisoners of war as forced labor. This amount is comparable to the 3,000 t (3,300 short tons) that were produced by China in 2018. The price for mercury decreased from a peak of US$571 per 76-pound (34 kg) flask in 1965 to US$121 in 1976, making economic planning difficult. In 1981, the Spanish government created the company Minas de Almadén y Arrayanes to operate the mine. In 2000, the mines closed due to the fall of the price of mercury on the international market, caused by falling demand. However, Almadén still has one of the world's largest mercury resources.

=== Heritage site ===
Almadén is now a World Heritage Site, Heritage of Mercury. Almadén and Idrija. A museum has been built; the site allows visits to the mines (in areas dating from 16th to 20th century).

The International Union of Geological Sciences (IUGS) acknowledged Almadén as "the largest known mercury deposit in the Earth and with a longest productive history dating back to the 3rd century BCS". Due to this, IUGS included "the giant mercury deposit of the Almadén syncline" in its assemblage of 100 world "geological heritage sites" published in October 2022. The organisation defines an IUGS Geological Heritage Site as "a key place with geological elements and/or processes of international scientific relevance, used as a reference, and/or with a substantial contribution to the development of geological sciences through history".

== Climate ==
Almadén has a mediterranean climate (Csa on the Köppen climate classification), bordering on a cold semi-arid climate (Köppen: BSk) and a hot semi-arid climate (Köppen: BSh). The city has mild winters, although temperatures can sometimes drop below 0 °C (32 °F) on some nights. Summers are very hot, with mean maximum temperatures often above 35 °C (95 °F) and days above 40 °C (104 °F) are common. Almadén holds the record for the highest monthly average temperature ever recorded in Spain and the Iberian Peninsula: 31.6 °C (88.9 °F) in July 2022, with a mean maximum of 40.3 °C (104.5 °F) and a minimum of 22.9 °C (73.2 °F). Precipitation is generally scarce, with summer being the driest season and the remaining seasons having similar but scarce precipitation values. The annual temperature range is high, exceeding 20 °C (68 °F).

Climate data for Almadén (2003–2025), extremes (2003–present)
Month	Jan	Feb	Mar	Apr	May	Jun	Jul	Aug	Sep	Oct	Nov	Dec	Year
Record high °C (°F)	24.5 (76.1)	25.6 (78.1)	30.2 (86.4)	36.6 (97.9)	40.2 (104.4)	43.3 (109.9)	44.6 (112.3)	45.6 (114.1)	43.5 (110.3)	35.6 (96.1)	27.1 (80.8)	24.0 (75.2)	45.6 (114.1)
Mean daily maximum °C (°F)	13.2 (55.8)	14.9 (58.8)	17.6 (63.7)	21.1 (70.0)	26.7 (80.1)	32.5 (90.5)	36.4 (97.5)	36.6 (97.9)	30.8 (87.4)	24.9 (76.8)	17.1 (62.8)	13.7 (56.7)	23.8 (74.8)
Daily mean °C (°F)	8.5 (47.3)	9.8 (49.6)	12.2 (54.0)	15.2 (59.4)	19.9 (67.8)	25.1 (77.2)	28.5 (83.3)	28.8 (83.8)	23.8 (74.8)	19.0 (66.2)	12.5 (54.5)	9.2 (48.6)	17.7 (63.9)
Mean daily minimum °C (°F)	3.8 (38.8)	4.8 (40.6)	6.8 (44.2)	9.2 (48.6)	13.0 (55.4)	17.7 (63.9)	20.6 (69.1)	21.0 (69.8)	16.8 (62.2)	13.1 (55.6)	7.9 (46.2)	4.7 (40.5)	11.6 (52.9)
Record low °C (°F)	−6.7 (19.9)	−3.0 (26.6)	−3.0 (26.6)	1.3 (34.3)	3.7 (38.7)	10.0 (50.0)	12.1 (53.8)	13.4 (56.1)	9.6 (49.3)	3.2 (37.8)	−0.6 (30.9)	−3.8 (25.2)	−6.7 (19.9)
Average precipitation mm (inches)	33.7 (1.33)	39.3 (1.55)	60.7 (2.39)	39.2 (1.54)	22.6 (0.89)	9.9 (0.39)	0.6 (0.02)	4.7 (0.19)	28.4 (1.12)	59.1 (2.33)	42.5 (1.67)	41.0 (1.61)	381.7 (15.03)
Source: Agencia Estatal de Meteorologia

== See also ==
- Huancavelica, the other major source of mercury in the Spanish Empire
- The New Almaden Quicksilver Mine in Santa Clara County, California
