= Flask (unit) =

Unit of mass used for mercury

Flask is a British unit of mass or weight in the avoirdupois system, used to measure mercury. It is defined as 76 pounds (34 kg). Near room temperature, a flask of mercury occupies a volume of approximately 2.5451 litres (86.060 US fl oz; 89.575 imp fl oz).

== Conversion ==
1 flask (mercury) ≡ 76 lb

1 flask (mercury) ≡ 34.47302012 kg
