= Almaden Quicksilver County Park =

Former mercury mines adjacent to San Jose, California

- IUCN category V (protected landscape/seascape)
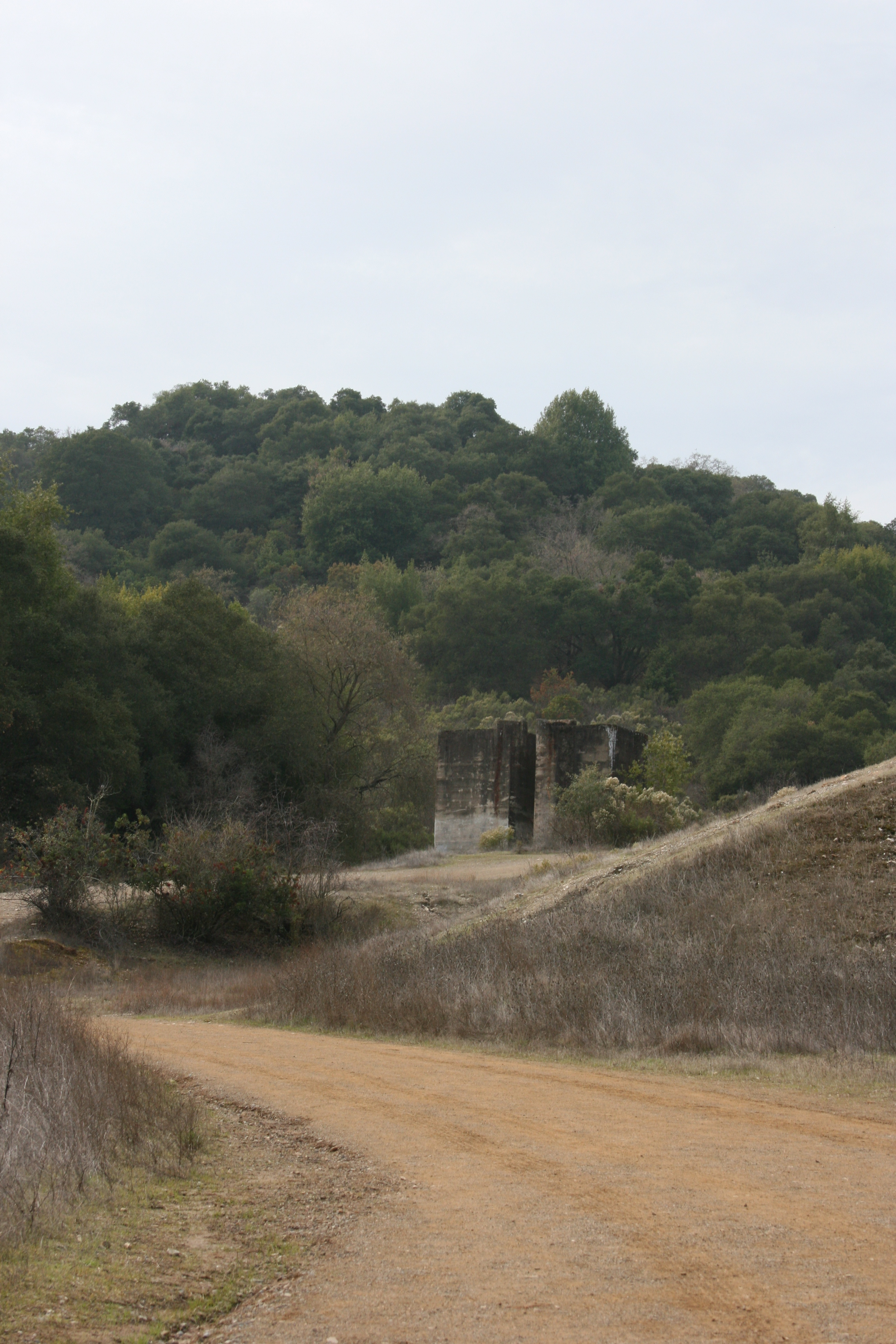
- Senador Mine ruins
- Interactive map of Almaden Quicksilver County Park
- Coordinates: 37°12′27″N 121°52′51″W
- Area: 4,163 acres (16.85 km^{2})
- Established: 1978

Almaden Quicksilver County Park is a 4,163 acres (17 km^{2}) park that includes the grounds of former mercury ("quicksilver") mines adjacent to south San Jose, California, USA. The park's elevation varies greatly: the most used entrances (on the east side of the park) are less than 600 feet (183 m) above sea level, while the highest point in the park is over 1,700 feet (518 m) above sea level.

The park is owned by the County of Santa Clara and managed by the Santa Clara County Parks and Recreation Department. Its grounds include the Guadalupe Reservoir and features sweeping views of San Jose. Adjacent to the park is the Almaden Reservoir. The Casa Grande Almaden Quicksilver Mining Museum is located in nearby New Almaden. The park is named after the New Almaden Quicksilver Mines, which were named after the mercury mine in (old) Almadén, Spain, and produced mercury that was used to process ore during the Gold Rush.

== History ==
The park's New Almaden Mines were in operation from 1847 to 1976. The mines were highly important during the California Gold Rush, since mercury was used to extract gold from ore. By the time Santa Clara County bought the mines in 1976 and ended operations, 83,974,076 pounds (37,388 metric tons) of mercury (worth more than US$70 million) had been extracted.

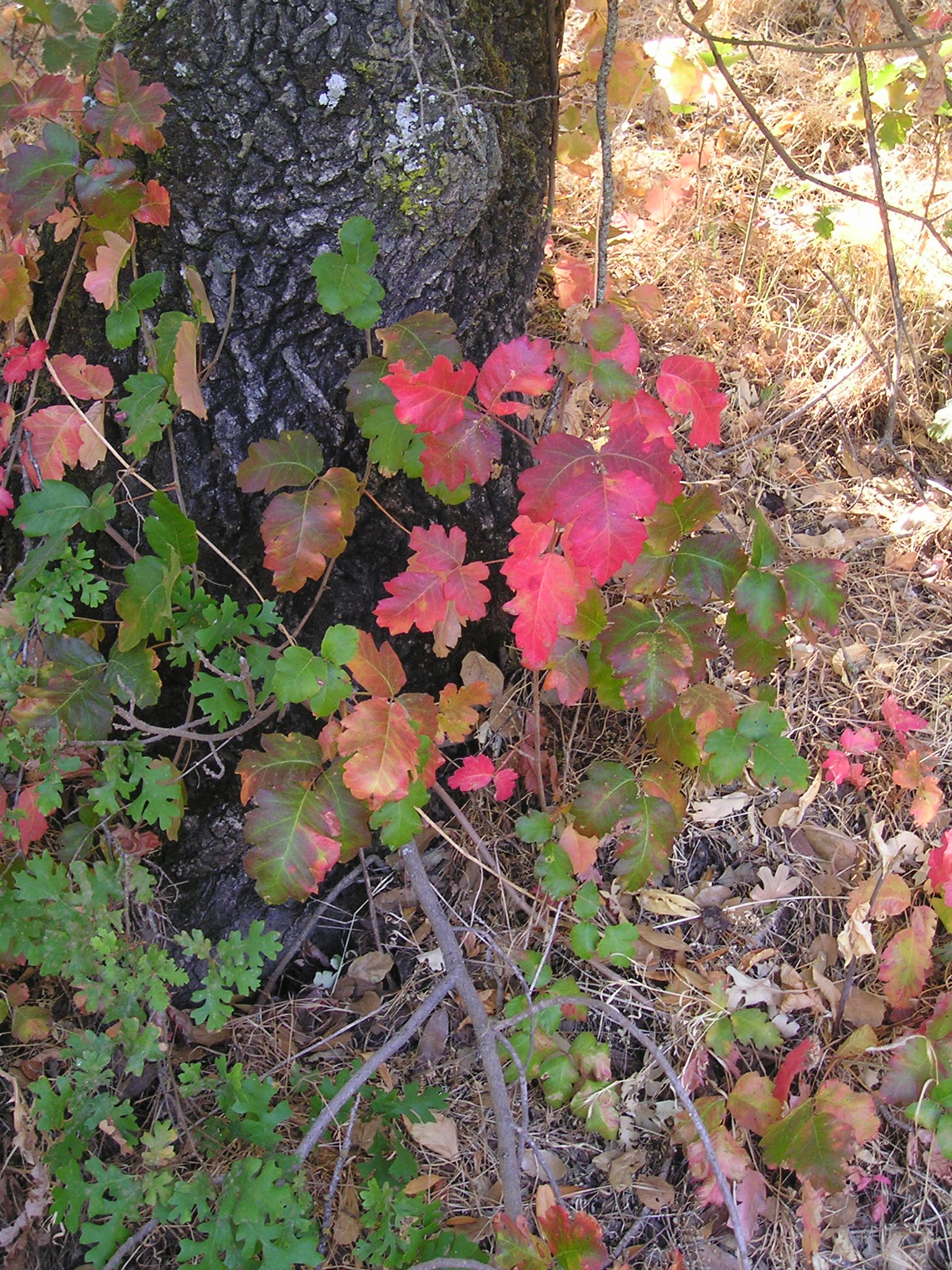
Western Poison-oak in autumn, a common hazard in the park

The remains of a variety of structures left over from the 135 years of mining activity, including housing for the up to 1,800 miners, are scattered about the park, with the biggest concentration at what was known as English Camp, established by Cornish miners in the 1860s. Some structures were built later by the U.S. Army Corps of Engineers and there is a memorial honoring the Civilian Conservation Corps firefighters that were stationed there for a time.

== Conversion from mines to park ==
In the period 1976 to 1978, the county developed a number of new large parks in rapid succession including Grant Ranch Park, Sanborn Park and Almaden Quicksilver County Park. Very soon after buying the mining property in 1976, Santa Clara County began planning for park usage, in an era where the county parks program was aggressively expanding.

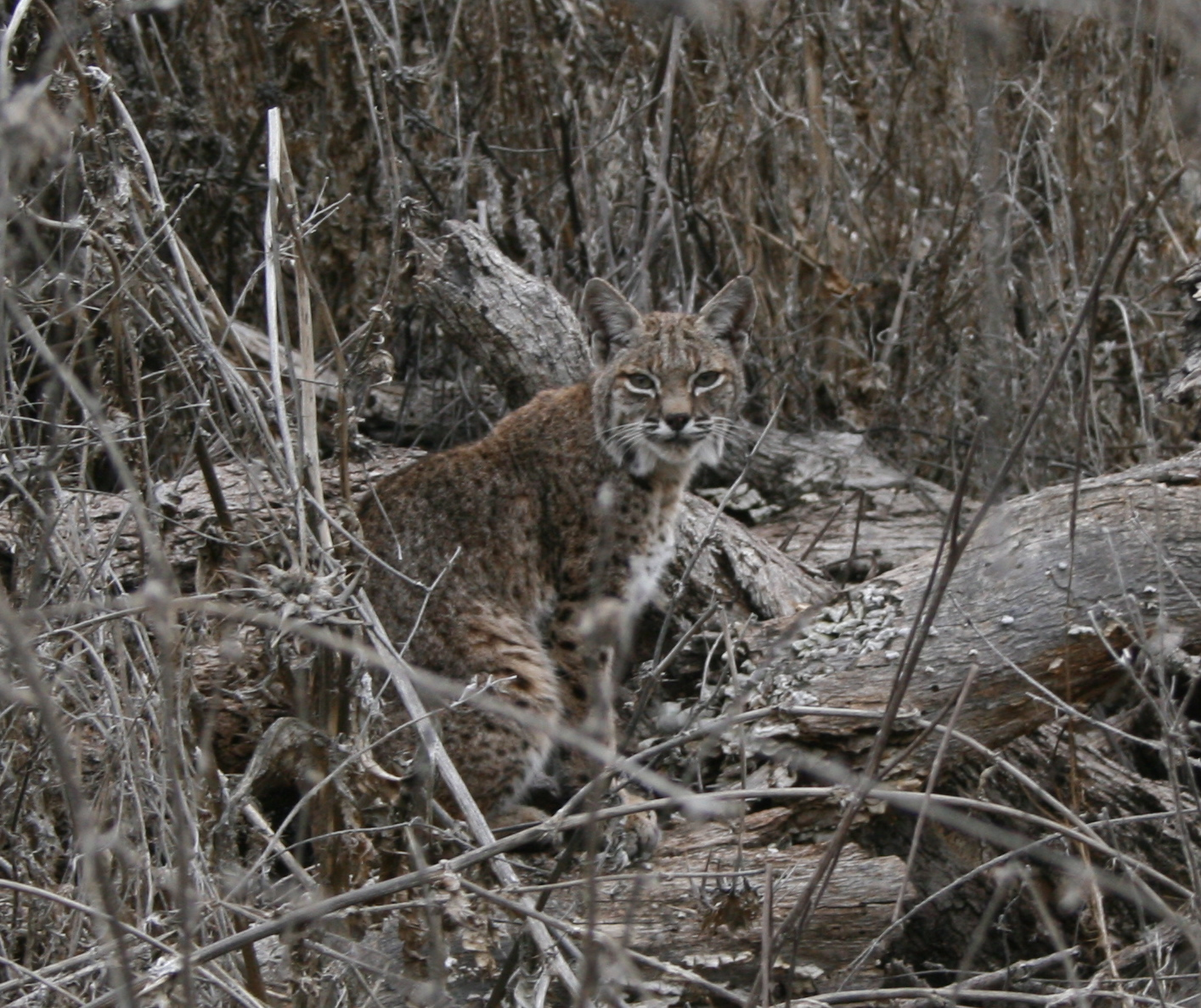
Bobcat in wintertime, 100 meters from the trail

The county parks director envisioned a historic park where visitors could experience the mining past and also enjoy the biodiversity of the natural setting. Facilities plans were created and an Environmental Impact Report was prepared.

Principal issues assessed in the park proposal were:

- biological impacts upon habitat by park users
- water quality impacts to creeks draining the watershed
- visual and drainage impacts of road improvements
- historical analysis of mine usage

== See also ==
- Shaft mining
- Surface runoff
- New Almaden town and quicksilver mines
