= Loma Chiquita, California =

Unincorporated community in California, United States

Loma Chiquita
- Location in the United States Loma Chiquita (the United States)
- Coordinates: 37°06′18″N 121°49′25″W
- Country: United States
- State: California
- County: Santa Clara

Area
  - Total: 1.2 sq mi (3.1 km^{2})
  - Land: 1.2 sq mi (3.1 km^{2})
  - Water: 0.0 sq mi (0 km^{2})
- Elevation: 2,598 ft (792 m)
- Time zone: UTC-8 (PST)
  - Summer (DST): UTC-7 (PDT)
- ZIP code: 95033, 95037
- Area codes: 408, 669
- GNIS feature ID: 227487

Loma Chiquita is an unincorporated rural area along the ridge leading to Loma Chiquita summit in southwest Santa Clara County, California. The area covers the associated ridgeline and hillsides, from the eastern base of Loma Prieta, towards the west near the intersection with upper Little Uvas Road. The northern part faces the Mountain Home area, and the southern part overlaps with Uvas Canyon.

The western half of the region lies within the Los Gatos Mountains zip code 95033, and the eastern half lies within the Morgan Hill zip code 95037. The telephone area codes are 408 and 669.

== Geography ==
The Loma Chiquita ridge ranges from a peak of approximately 3,300 feet (1,000 metres) near the base of Loma Prieta to 1,800 feet (550 metres) above Little Uvas Valley. The ridge divides the upper Llagas and Uvas creek watersheds, which provide water to the Chesbro and Uvas reservoirs, respectively.

Native vegetation consists of mixed conifer-oak woodland along the mountain ridge, to chaparral and coastal scrub along the slopes.

The area has a warm-summer Mediterranean climate.

== History ==
In Spanish, "Loma Chiquita" means "little ridge". The ridgeline is relatively flat and gently sloping along its five-mile descent into the Little Uvas Valley.

Prior to the arrival of the Spaniards in the late-18th century, the area was inhabited by the Ohlone people. Shortly thereafter, Spanish (and later Mexican) governments began awarding large land tracts ("ranchos") for settlement and grazing. The area abuts the Rancho Soquel Augmentación and Rancho Las Uvas lands granted in the mid-19th century. In the early 20th century, a few (unsuccessful) attempts were made to establish summer resorts in the area. However, a small population began staying year-round and has since grown into the present-day community.

In 2015, the indie drama Maya Dardel was filmed on location in Loma Chiquita, along properties near the intersection with Casa Loma Road.

=== Wildfires ===
As with most of the Santa Cruz Mountain region, wildfires periodically occur in the area. The area is primarily serviced by state and regional fire departments, as well as by local volunteer fire brigades.

The Croy Fire of 2002 originated on the hillsides facing Uvas Canyon County Park, and burned through the southeastern part of the area. The fire was caused by sparks from an unpermitted solar array.

The Loma Fire of 2016 originated near the eastern base of Loma Prieta, and caused extensive damage to many homes and properties in the area. The fire was caused by sparks from a portable generator.
