= Mountain Home, California =

Unincorporated community in California, United States

Mountain Home
- Unincorporated community
- Location in the United States
- Coordinates: 37°07′16″N 121°47′45″W
- Country: United States
- State: California
- County: Santa Clara

Area
  - Total: 6.0 sq mi (16 km^{2})
  - Land: 5.9 sq mi (15 km^{2})
  - Water: 0.1 sq mi (0.26 km^{2})
- Elevation: 928 ft (283 m)
- Time zone: UTC-8 (PST)
  - Summer (DST): UTC-7 (PDT)
- ZIP code: 95033, 95037
- Area codes: 408, 669
- GNIS feature ID: 1670815

Mountain Home, also known as Casa Loma (Spanish for "Mountain Home"), is a sparsely populated area located on the eastern side of the Santa Cruz Mountains in unincorporated southwestern Santa Clara County, California, United States near Mount Chual and Rancho Canada del Oro Open Space Preserves. The Loma Fire burned approximately one-half of the region in 2016.

== Geography ==
The area is situated within the upper Llagas Creek watershed, bounded by Mount Chual and Rancho Canada del Oro Open Space Preserves toward the north, Loma Prieta Road on the west, Loma Chiquita Road on the south, and Twin Creeks Road on the east. The region includes small communities along Casa Loma Road, Mt Chual Spur Road, and Twin Falls Road.

The area is mostly mountain ridges with steep, sloping terrain and narrow canyons. The Berrocal Fault runs diagonally through the center of the area.

Native vegetation ranges from a mixed conifer-oak woodland along the mountain ridges, to chaparral and coastal scrub along the slopes, to riparian flora along the canyon floors.

== Climate ==
According to the Köppen climate classification system, Mountain Home has a warm-summer Mediterranean climate, abbreviated "Csb" on climate maps.

== History ==
In 2016, the Loma Fire burned through approximately half the region, with multiple homes damaged or destroyed.
