= Lions Peak =

Mountain in California, United States

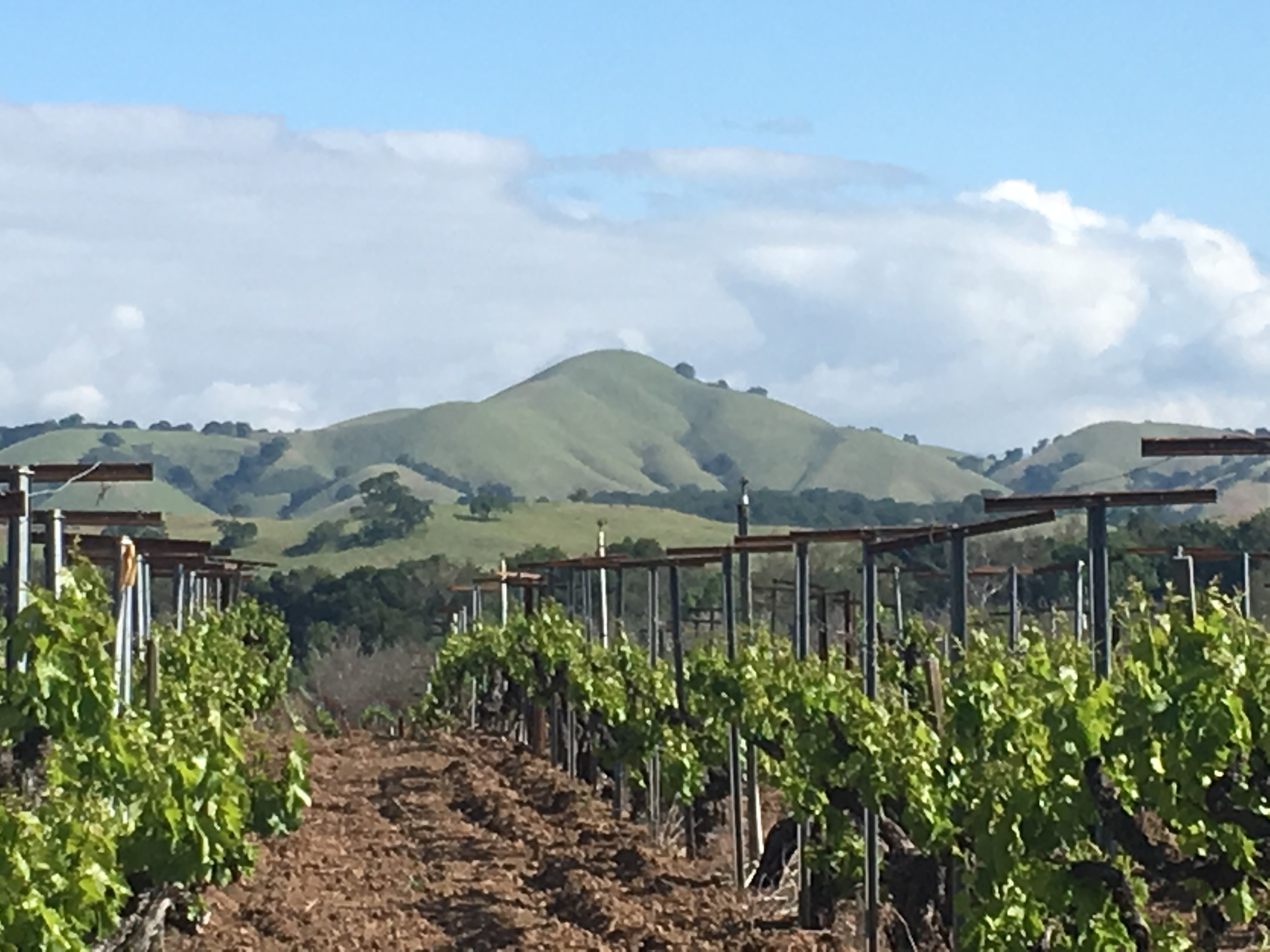
- View of Lions Peak along Hecker Pass Highway

Highest point
- Elevation: 1,117 ft (340 m) NGVD 29
- Prominence: 257 ft (78 m) NGVD 29
- Coordinates: 37°03′24″N 121°37′56″W

Geography
- Location within California Location within the United States
- Location: Santa Clara County, California, U.S.
- Parent range: Santa Cruz Mountains
- Topo map: USGS Mount Madonna

Lions Peak is a prominent hill in the eastern foothills of the Santa Cruz Mountains in southwest Santa Clara County, California. The landmark lies west of San Martin, and is adjacent to the resort village of CordeValle. The headwaters of Lions Creek originate on the eastern flank of the hill, and flow southward before merging with Llagas Creek in Gilroy. The hill and surrounding area is located on approximately 1,400 acres (570 ha) of privately owned lands, and is viewable along U.S. Route 101 and California State Route 152 in South Santa Clara Valley.

== History ==
The land surrounding the peak, once part of the historic Rancho San Francisco de las Llagas, was purchased by Messrs Lion and Buckley in the late 19th century.

In the summer of 2008, dry lightning ignited fires northwest of the hill, burning nearly 800 acres (320 ha) nearby.

== See also ==
- List of summits of the San Francisco Bay Area
