= Eastman Canyon Creek =

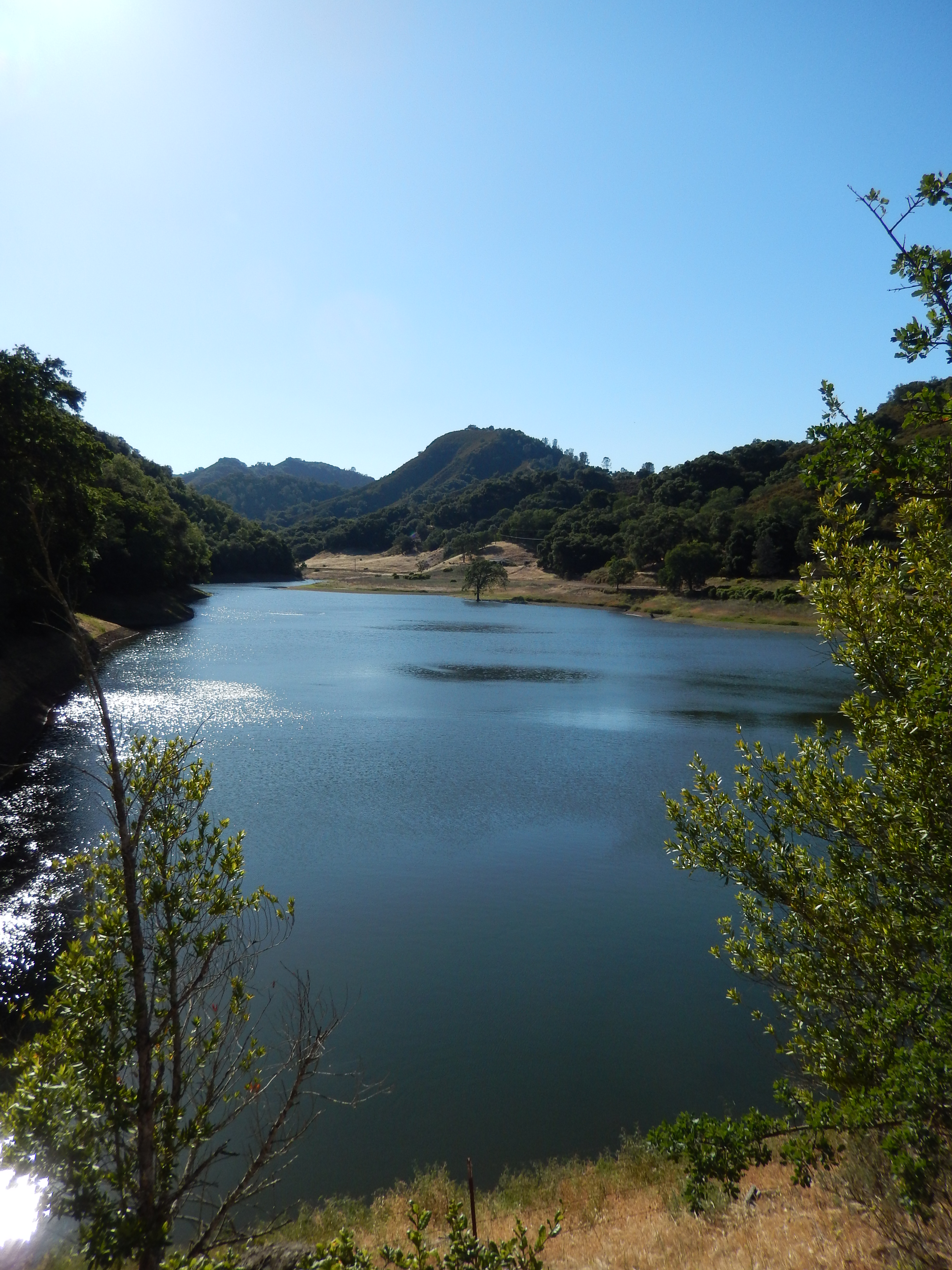
- Eastman Canyon Creek along Uvas Road

Location
- Country: United States
- State: California
- Region: Santa Clara County
- City: Morgan Hill, California

Physical characteristics
- Source: On the eastern flank of Croy Ridge Peak in the Santa Cruz Mountains
  - coordinates: 37°03′08″N 121°45′15″W
  - elevation: 492 ft (150 m)
- Mouth: Confluence with Uvas Creek emptying into Uvas Reservoir
  - coordinates: 37°04′16″N 121°42′10″W
  - elevation: 167 ft (51 m)

Eastman Canyon Creek is a perennial stream in Santa Clara County, California, United States. The headwaters rise on the eastern flank of Croy Ridge in the Santa Cruz Mountains, and flow eastward, eventually emptying into the Uvas Reservoir.

Eastman Canyon Road follows alongside the creek for most of its length, ending at the intersection with Uvas Road.

== See also ==
- Riparian zone
- List of watercourses in the San Francisco Bay Area
