= Little Arthur Creek =

Stream in Santa Clara County, California

- Location of the mouth of Little Arthur Creek 5 miles west of Gilroy, California

Location
- Country: United States
- State: California
- Region: Santa Clara County

Physical characteristics
- Source: Crest of the southern Santa Cruz Mountains
  - location: 3.8 miles (6.1 km) northwest of Mount Madonna
  - coordinates: 37°02′57″N 121°45′10″W
  - elevation: 2,235 ft (681 m)
- Mouth: Confluence with Uvas Creek
  - location: 5 miles (8.0 km) west/northwest of Gilroy, California
  - coordinates: 37°01′41″N 121°39′23″W
  - elevation: 292 ft (89 m)

Little Arthur Creek, historically San Antonio Creek, is a 6.1-mile-long (9.8 km) east/southeastward-flowing stream originating just west of the crest of the Santa Cruz Mountains. It joins Uvas Creek about 4 miles (6.4 km) west of Gilroy, California, Santa Clara County, California. Uvas Creek is, in turn, tributary to the Pajaro River and thence to Monterey Bay and the Pacific Ocean.

== History ==
Little Arthur Creek was named for a little boy who loved fishing in the creek before 1900, however his surname remains unknown. In 1863 Charles and Annis Sanders homesteaded the upper Little Arthur Creek watershed and in 1891 built a 20 guest room Victorian hotel called Redwood Retreat. The Redwood Retreat Road follows the stream up to Fernwood Cellars, a winery built on the Redwood Retreat land.

== Watershed and course ==
Little Arthur Creek originates west of the crest of the southern Santa Cruz Mountains, a.k.a. Sierra Azul. It flows 6.1 miles (9.8 km) east/southeast to join Uvas Creek about 4 miles (6.4 km) downstream from Uvas Reservoir.

== Habitat and wildlife ==
The creek hosts endangered species act listed threatened South-Central coastal distinct population segment (DPS) of anadromous steelhead trout (Oncorhynchus mykiss). Little Arthur Creek is one of the last remaining "inland" central coast steelhead streams with viable fish runs and is one of only a few Pajaro River tributaries with cool, perennial summer rearing habitat. Thirty feet high Pickell's Dam was built over a century ago and blocked 3 miles (4.8 km) of good spawning and rearing habitat for steelhead. Flycasters of San Jose constructed a fishway around Pickell's Dam, located at stream mile 1.5, in the mid-1980s. In October, 2024 Trout Unlimited sponsored the removal of Pickel's Dam.

Ferbrache Dam is the main remaining barrier to upstream passage of steelhead trout, and prevents use of 2 miles (3.2 km) of rearing habitat downstream from Redwood Retreat.

== See also ==
- Uvas Creek
