= Twin Peaks (Santa Clara County, California) =

Mountain peaks in California, United States

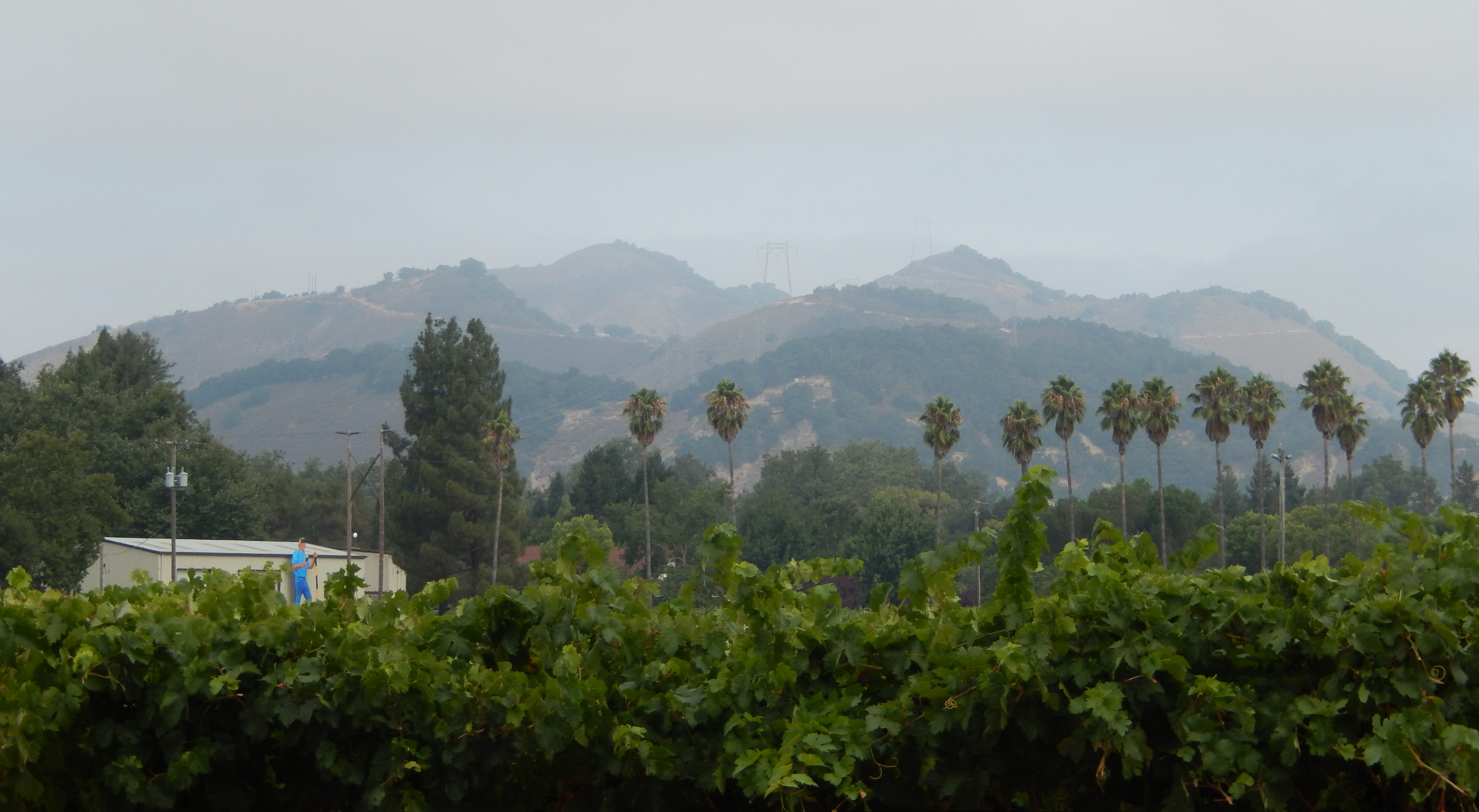
- View of Twin Peaks along Watsonville Road.

Highest point
- Elevation: 1,486 ft (453 m) NAVD 88
- Coordinates: 37°04′47″N 121°41′25″W

Geography
- Location within California
- Location: Santa Clara County, California, U.S.
- Parent range: Santa Cruz Mountains
- Topo map: USGS Mount Madonna

Twin Peaks are two prominent peaks along the foothills east of the Santa Cruz Mountains in Santa Clara County, California. The peaks are nestled between Uvas Reservoir to the west, and Paradise Valley in Morgan Hill to the east. The headwaters for Sycamore Creek rise from the eastern hillsides near these peaks.

Although part of the Uvas Reservoir County Park, no trails currently lead to the peaks from the park side.

== See also ==
- List of summits of the San Francisco Bay Area
