= South Valley =

South Valley is the name of several places in the United States:

- South Valley, Santa Clara County in California
- South Valley, Bernalillo County in New Mexico
- South Valley, Cattaraugus County in New York
- South Valley Stream, New York, Nassau County in New York
- South Valley Township, Rolette County in North Dakota
