= Cañada Garcia Creek =

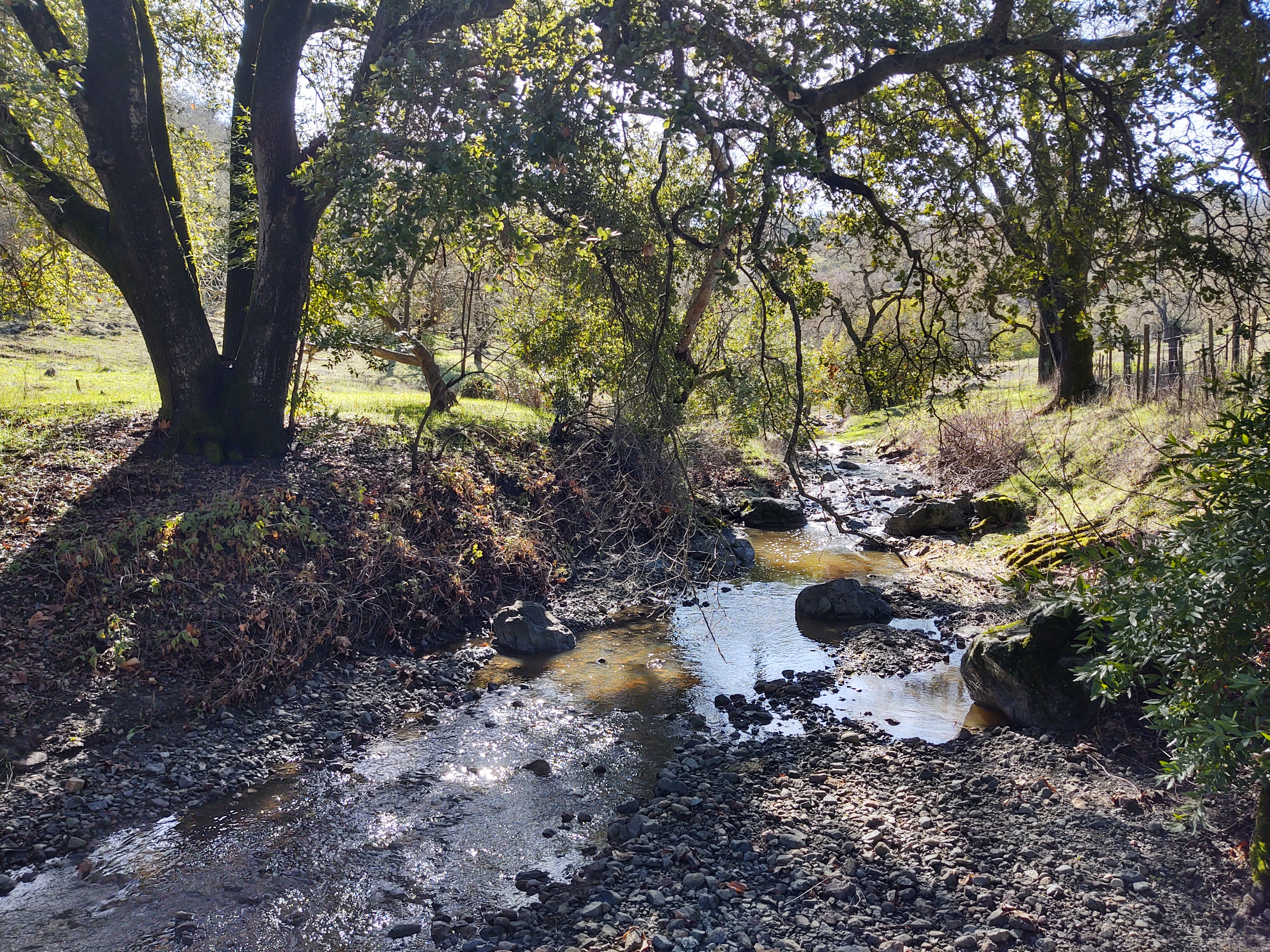
- Cañada Garcia Creek near Old Oak Glen Avenue

Location
- Country: United States
- State: California
- Region: Santa Clara County
- City: Morgan Hill, California

Physical characteristics
- Source: On the southern flank of Portezuelo Gap near Manzanita Ridge in the eastern foothills of the Santa Cruz Mountains
  - coordinates: 37°08′12″N 121°45′53″W
  - elevation: 1,080 ft (330 m)
- Mouth: Confluence with Llagas Creek
  - coordinates: 37°07′27″N 121°44′00″W
  - elevation: 530 ft (160 m)
- Length: 2.5 mi (4.0 km)

Cañada Garcia Creek is a perennial stream in southwest Santa Clara County, California, United States. The headwaters rise on the southern flank of Portezuelo Gap near Manzanita Ridge in the eastern foothills of the Santa Cruz Mountains. From there, the creek flows southeastward, eventually merging with Llagas Creek.

== History ==
In Spanish, the word "cañada" means "ravine". The valley around the ravine and creek was once part of the larger Pueblo Tract Nº 3 and Rancho Las Uvas lands granted in the mid-19th century.

== Ecology ==
Cañada Garcia is one of several serpentine valley habitats identified as helping to sustain Bay checkerspot butterfly populations.

== See also ==
- Riparian zone
