= William Rust Summit =

Mountain in California, United States

- Location within California

Highest point
- Elevation: 1,004 ft (306 m) NAVD 88
- Coordinates: 37°55′35″N 122°17′27″W

Geography
- Location: Contra Costa County, California, U.S.
- Parent range: Berkeley Hills
- Topo map: USGS Richmond

William Rust Summit or Willhelm Rust Summit is a summit in Contra Costa County, California in the Berkeley Hills above the city of El Cerrito. It was named in honor of William Rust (1857–1940), a pioneer settler who was active in business & community affairs.

== See also ==
- List of summits of the San Francisco Bay Area
