= Ashrama, California =

Unincorporated community in California, United States

Ashrama
- Unincorporated community
- Location within California Location within the United States
- Coordinates: 37°18′26″N 121°28′11″W
- Country: United States
- State: California
- County: Santa Clara
- Time zone: UTC-8 (Pacific (PST))
  - Summer (DST): UTC-7 (PDT)
- GNIS feature ID: 1657956

Shanti Ashrama is a spiritual retreat located in the Upper San Antonio Valley in unincorporated Santa Clara County, California, United States as a branch of the Ramakrishna Mission. It is approximately 40 miles (64 km) east of downtown San Jose.

== History ==
The retreat resides on 160 acres (65 ha) of oak-studded chaparral scrubland near Upper San Antonio Valley Road, about 18 miles (29 km) southeast of Mount Hamilton. The land was gifted to the Vedanta Society at the turn of the 20th century, as a place for meditation and contemplation. A meditation cabin there serves as the site for annual retreats.
