= Sycamore Creek (Santa Clara County) =

Location
- Country: United States
- State: California
- Region: Santa Clara County
- City: Morgan Hill, California

Physical characteristics
- Source: On the eastern hillsides near Twin Peaks
  - coordinates: 37°04′46″N 121°40′53″W
  - elevation: 1,065 ft (325 m)
- Mouth: Confluence with Uvas Creek
  - coordinates: 37°03′22″N 121°39′53″W
  - elevation: 348 ft (106 m)
- Length: 2 mi (3.2 km)

Sycamore Creek is a perennial stream in Santa Clara County, California, United States. The headwaters rise on the eastern hillsides near Twin Peaks and flow southwest, eventually joining with Uvas Creek.

== History ==
The creek was named for the many sycamore trees growing along its bank.

The MOHI Ranch (formerly Sycamore Creek Vineyards) in Uvas Valley lies near the intersection between the creeks.

== See also ==
- Riparian zone
