= Rose Peak (California) =

Mountain in the American state of California

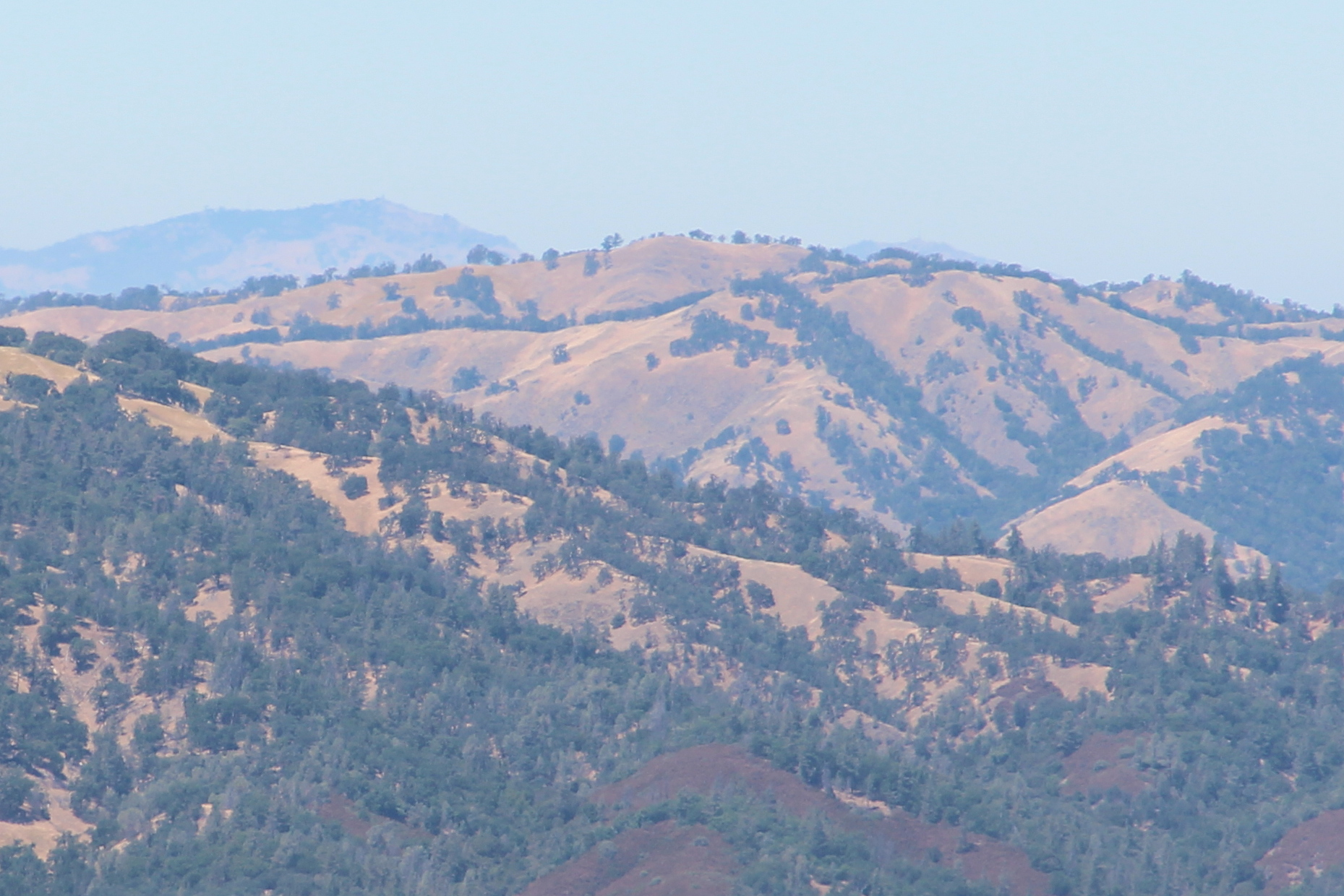
- Rose Peak seen from Mount Hamilton. Mount Diablo is in the background on the left.

Highest point
- Elevation: 3,817 ft (1,163 m) NAVD 88
- Listing: California County High Points
- Coordinates: 37°30′40″N 121°43′29″W

Geography
- Location within California
- Location: Alameda County, California, U.S.
- Parent range: Diablo Range
- Topo map: USGS Mendenhall Springs

Rose Peak is a peak in the Diablo Range of California and is the officially listed highest point in Alameda County, though other sources claim the high point is actually nearby Discovery Peak.

== See also ==
- List of highest points in California by county
