= Uvas Creek Preserve =

Park in Gilroy, California, United States

Coordinates: 37.00366°N 121.59579°W

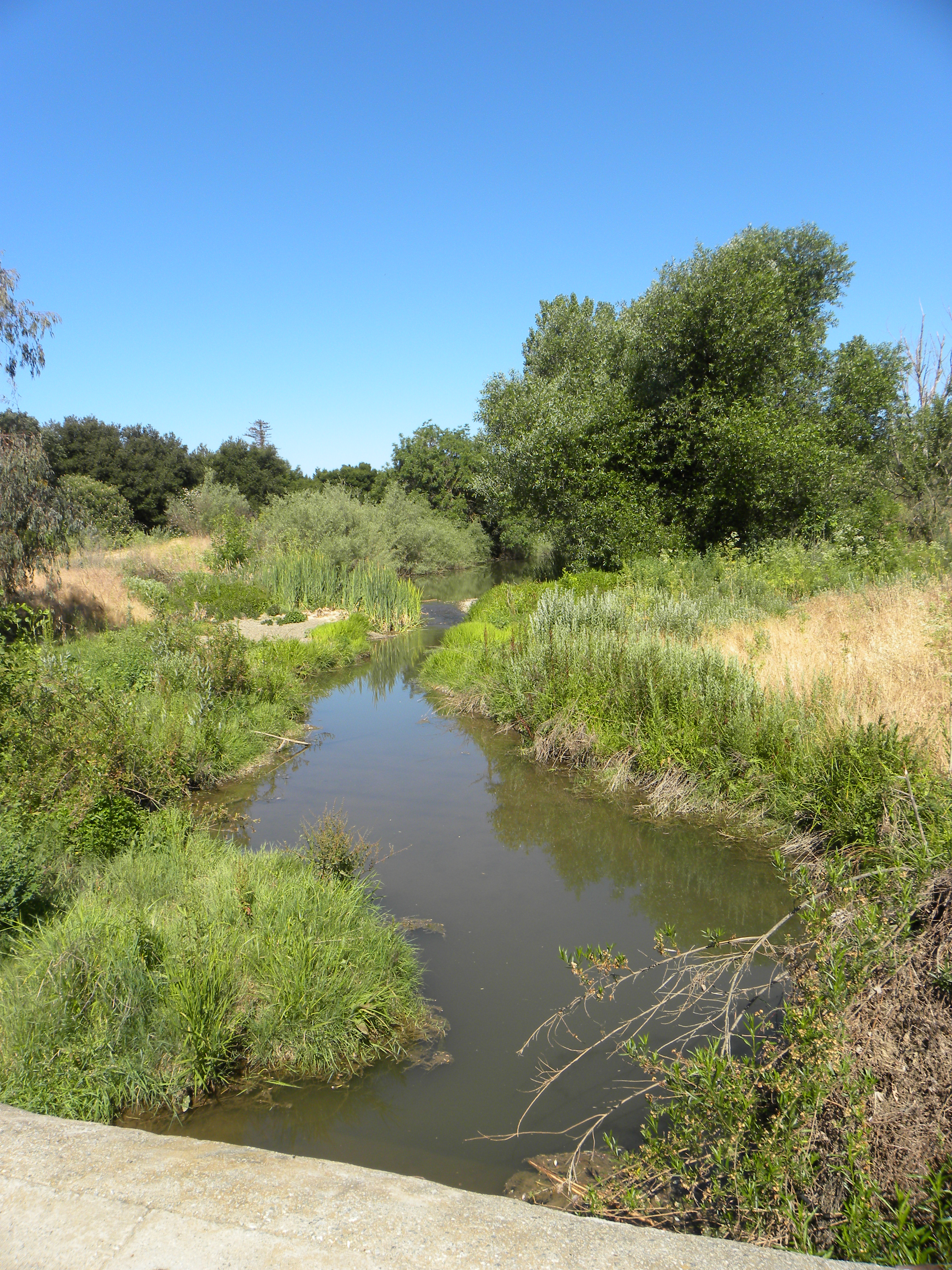
- Uvas Creek Preserve, near Silva's Crossing
- Interactive map of Uvas Creek Preserve
- Type: Urban park
- Location: Gilroy, California
- Area: 0.51 km^{2} (0.20 sq mi)
- Created: 2003
- Operator: City of Gilroy
- Status: Open daily

The Dennis DeBell Uvas Creek Park Preserve is a 125-acre greenbelt preserve operated by the City of Gilroy in southwest Santa Clara County, California. The Uvas Creek, which meanders through the center of the preserve, is its defining characteristic. The preserve is bordered by Uvas Creek Levee on the north, and by Christmas Hill Park on the south. A paved trail runs for approximately 2 miles along the boundary of the preserve, and can be used for jogging, hiking or bicycling.

The park is open seven days a week from 6:00 AM to 11:00 PM from March - October, and 6:00 AM to 8:00 PM from November - February.

== History ==
Planning for the preserve, located on a site formerly used for sand and gravel mining operations, began in the 1970s. In the 1980s, the family of Dennis DeBell, a former councilman and developer, bequeathed $1 million to the city to help further the project along. In 1995, significant efforts were made to restore the Uvas Creek in the preserve back to its natural state. In 2003, the Santa Clara County Board of Supervisors adopted a resolution honoring Dennis DeBell by renaming the City of Gilroy's Uvas Creek Park Preserve to the Dennis DeBell Uvas Creek Park Preserve.
