= Diablo Range (census county division) =

Unincorporated community in California, United States

- census county division (CCD)
- Location in the United States
- Coordinates: 37°14′31″N 121°31′12″W
- Country: United States
- State: California
- County: Santa Clara

Area
  - Total: 600.084 sq mi (1,554.210 km^{2})
  - Land: 595.656 sq mi (1,542.742 km^{2})
  - Water: 4.428 sq mi (11.468 km^{2}) 0.007%
- Elevation: 2,664 ft (812 m)

Population (2010)
  - Total: 1,508
  - Density: 2.532/sq mi (0.9775/km^{2})
- Time zone: UTC-8 (PST)
  - Summer (DST): UTC-7 (PDT)
- ZIP code(s): 94550, 95140, 95132, 95038, 95037, 95023, 95020
- Area codes: 831, 408, 209
- FIPS code: 06-08590680
- GNIS feature ID: 1935072

Diablo Range is an unincorporated census county division (CCD) located in the Diablo Mountains Range, on the eastern side of Santa Clara County, California, United States.

The area covers approximately 600 square miles (1,600 km^{2}), much of it open space, and contains Anderson Lake, Bullhead, Calaveras, and Cherry Flat reservoirs, as well as the Anderson Lake County Park, Grant Ranch County Park, and Metcalf Motorcycle county park.

The Henry W. Coe State Park and Pacheco State Park, the Sierra Vista Open Space, and Blue Oak Ranch Reserve preserves, along with the Mount Hamilton Lick Observatory, and the Ashrama retreat center are also located in the area.

The region has a warm and dry Mediterranean climate. Although some agriculture exists, many ranches in the area are used for livestock grazing or hunting game.

As of the 2010 US Census, the population was 1,508 residents of whom 55.2% were non-Hispanic white, 26.4% Hispanic, 12.7% Asian, and 5.7% of other races, with a median age of 42.6 years old. As of 2009, the median income was $91,977 and median home price $1,272,823.

Most residents and businesses in the area use postal ZIP codes from neighboring cities of Livermore, Milpitas, San Jose, Morgan Hill, Gilroy, or Hollister. The telephone area codes are 408 and 669 (Santa Clara County), 209 (overlaps with Stanislaus County to the east), and 831 (overlaps with San Benito County to the south).

== History ==
In Spanish, the word diablo means "devil".

The region includes a large portion of the Northern Diablo Range. It is home to recovering populations of tule elk, golden eagles, and Bay checkerspot butterflies.
