= Little Uvas Creek =

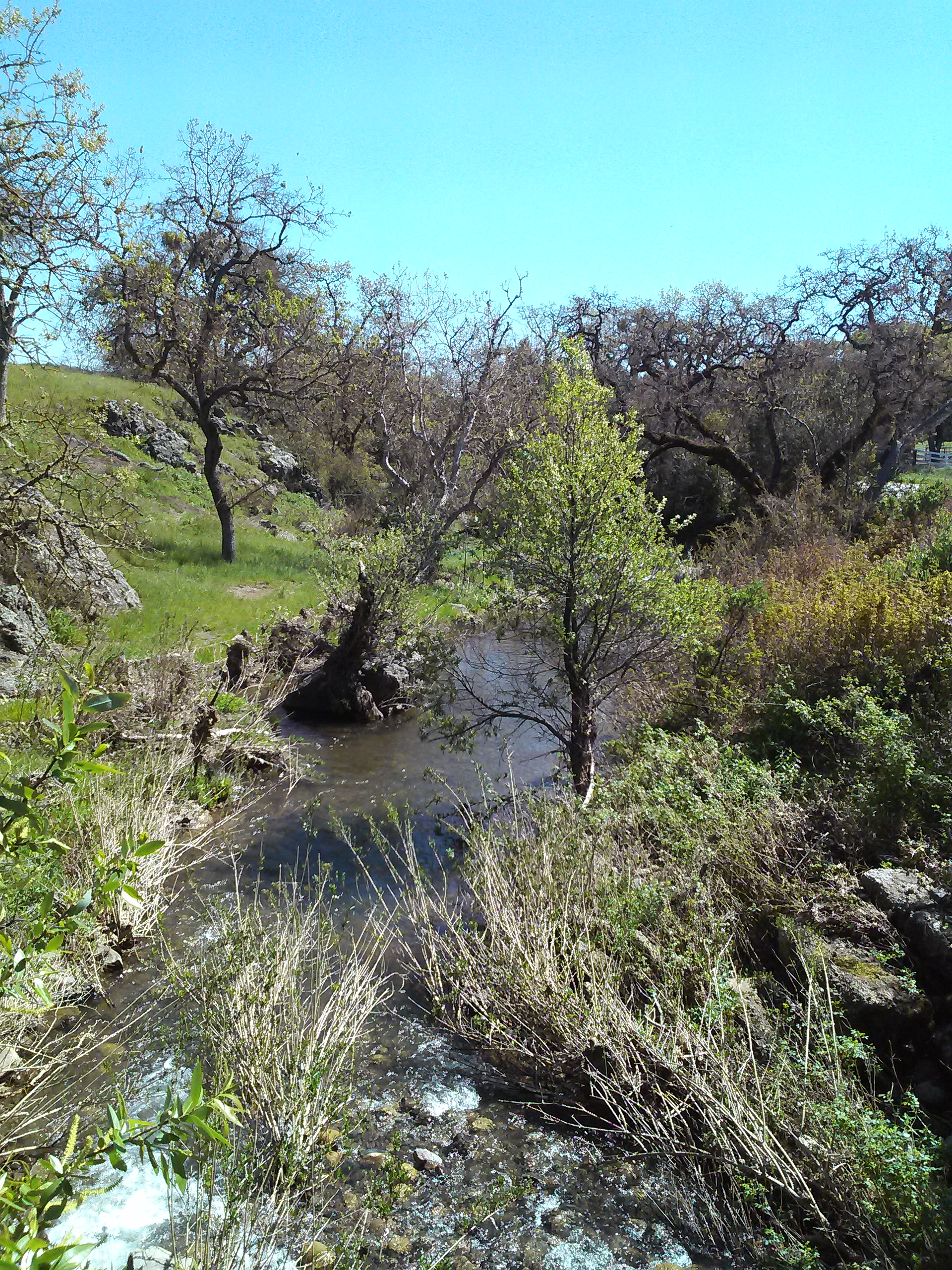
- Little Uvas Creek along Uvas Road, March 2017

Location
- Country: United States
- State: California
- Region: Santa Clara County
- City: Morgan Hill, California

Physical characteristics
- Source: On the northeastern flank of Loma Chiquita Ridge in the Santa Cruz Mountains
  - coordinates: 37°06′03″N 121°47′34″W
  - elevation: 2,100 ft (640 m)
- Mouth: Confluence with Uvas Creek
  - coordinates: 37°06′04″N 121°43′19″W
  - elevation: 530 ft (160 m)
- Length: 5.1 mi (8.2 km)

Little Uvas Creek is a perennial stream in southwest Santa Clara County, California, United States. The headwaters rise on the northeastern flank of Loma Chiquita Ridge in the Santa Cruz mountains, and flow eastward, eventually merging with Uvas Creek.

Little Uvas Road follows alongside the creek for most of its length, ending at the intersection with Uvas Road.

== See also ==
- Riparian zone
