= List of summits of the San Francisco Bay Area =

Know Watershed Impact Zones by Elevation Awareness

This is a list of named summits in the nine-county San Francisco Bay Area that are more than 1,000 feet (305 m) above sea level. Note that there are no natural features above 1,000 feet (305 m) in the city of San Francisco.

Unless otherwise referenced, all data are from the Geographic Names Information System (GNIS). GNIS elevations are imprecise.

Name	GNIS id	County	Height above sea level
Mount Allison	218152	Alameda	2,612 feet (796 m)
Mount Boardman	1658089	Alameda, Santa Clara	3,586 feet (1,093 m)
Brushy Peak	219956	Alameda	1,686 feet (514 m)
Cedar Mountain	220788	Alameda	3,678 feet (1,121 m)
Donlan Point	222499	Alameda	1,089 feet (332 m)
Maguire Peaks	227946	Alameda	1,601 feet (488 m)
Mission Peak	228839	Alameda	2,500 feet (762 m)
Ramage Peak	231200	Alameda	1,388 feet (423 m)
Sugarloaf Butte	235656	Alameda	2,710 feet (826 m)
Mount Wallace	237194	Alameda	3,091 feet (942 m)
Chaparral Peak	1658258	Contra Costa, Alameda	1,768 feet (539 m)
Grizzly Peak	1658677	Contra Costa, Alameda	1,736 feet (529 m)
Lookout Point	1659011	Alameda	3,458 feet (1,054 m)
Sunol Peak	1723545	Alameda	2,185 feet (666 m)
Vista Grande	2124657	Alameda	1,867 feet (569 m)
Black Point	219398	Contra Costa	1,614 feet (492 m)
Mount Diablo	222343	Contra Costa	3,849 feet (1,173 m) (Note: The USGS GNIS data lists Mount Diablo's elevation as 3,842 feet (1,171 m).)
Eagle Peak	222820	Contra Costa	2,290 feet (698 m)
Harlan Hill	224939	Contra Costa	1,736 feet (529 m)
Las Trampas Peak	226901	Contra Costa	1,804 feet (550 m)
Lawson Hill	226968	Contra Costa	1,125 feet (343 m)
Mitchell Rock	228875	Contra Costa	1,430 feet (436 m)
Mulligan Hill	229323	Contra Costa	1,398 feet (426 m)
North Peak	229745	Contra Costa	3,491 feet (1,064 m)
Oyster Point	230186	Contra Costa	2,113 feet (644 m)
Redwood Peak	231447	Contra Costa	1,539 feet (469 m)
Round Top	231972	Contra Costa	1,742 feet (531 m)
Twin Peaks	236710	Contra Costa	1,519 feet (463 m)
Wiedemann Hill	237732	Contra Costa	1,847 feet (563 m)
Windy Point	238033	Contra Costa	2,077 feet (633 m)
Mount Zion	238321	Contra Costa	1,549 feet (472 m)
William Rust Summit	251977	Contra Costa	1,007 feet (307 m)
Ransom Point	252216	Contra Costa	3,402 feet (1,037 m)
Vollmer Peak	255204	Contra Costa	1,913 feet (583 m)
Artist Point	1655803	Contra Costa	1,591 feet (485 m)
Cave Point	1655876	Contra Costa	2,087 feet (636 m)
Knob Point	1656117	Contra Costa	1,863 feet (568 m)
Wall Point	1656397	Contra Costa	1,552 feet (473 m)
Eureka Peak	1658514	Contra Costa	1,637 feet (499 m)
Mulholland Hill	1659194	Contra Costa	1,175 feet (358 m)
Antonio Mountain	218311	Marin	1,165 feet (355 m)
Bald Hill	218568	Marin	1,145 feet (349 m)
Barnabe Mountain	218682	Marin	1,460 feet (445 m)
Black Mountain	219377	Marin	1,283 feet (391 m)
Burdell Mountain	220178	Marin	1,562 feet (476 m)
Mount Tamalpais – East Peak	222916	Marin	2,569 feet (783 m)
Green Hill	224545	Marin	1,417 feet (432 m)
Hicks Mountain	225235	Marin	1,532 feet (467 m)
Loma Alta	227486	Marin	1,594 feet (486 m)
Pilot Knob	230660	Marin	1,188 feet (362 m)
Pine Mountain	230708	Marin	1,762 feet (537 m)
Red Hill	231330	Marin	1,230 feet (375 m)
Shroyer Mountain	233068	Marin	1,444 feet (440 m)
Firtop	233880	Marin	1,329 feet (405 m)
Three Peaks	236311	Marin	1,158 feet (353 m)
West Point	237510	Marin	1,808 feet (551 m)
White Hill	237643	Marin	1,430 feet (436 m)
Point Reyes Hill	253775	Marin	1,339 feet (408 m)
Mount Vision	255199	Marin	1,283 feet (391 m)
Mount Wittenberg	255243	Marin	1,407 feet (429 m)
Mount Tamalpais – Middle Peak	1659122	Marin	2,513 feet (766 m)
Oat Hill	1659278	Marin	1,234 feet (376 m)
Serpentine Point	1659628	Marin	1,572 feet (479 m)
Mount Tamalpais – West Peak	1660148 (Note: Mount Tamalpais is also listed under GNIS 235989 with the same coordinates as West Peak.)	Marin	2,575 feet (785 m)
Cardiac Hill	1800578	Marin	1,375 feet (419 m)
Ballou Point	1800637	Marin	2,021 feet (616 m)
Bare Knoll	1800640	Marin	1,585 feet (483 m)
Trojan Point	1800661	Marin	1,863 feet (568 m)
Wooded Knoll	1800663	Marin	1,529 feet (466 m)
Cliff Peak	1808937	Marin	1,401 feet (427 m)
Liberty Peak	1808946	Marin	1,421 feet (433 m)
Twin Knolls	1808967	Marin	1,985 feet (605 m)
Knob Hill	226658	Marin	1,093 feet (333 m)
Anderson Mountain	218265	Napa	1,811 feet (552 m)
Baldy Mountain	218618	Napa	2,054 feet (626 m)
Barton Hill	218714	Napa	1,037 feet (316 m)
Berryessa Peak	219086	Napa	3,041 feet (927 m)
Browns Hill	219906	Napa	2,707 feet (825 m)
Devils Head Peak	233781	Napa	1,079 feet (329 m)
Elkhorn Peak	223139	Napa, Solano	1,201 feet (366 m)
Mount George	224118	Napa	1,877 feet (572 m)
Greeg Mountain	224533	Napa	1,818 feet (554 m)
High Point	225273	Napa	2,703 feet (824 m)
Iron Mountain	225984	Napa	2,277 feet (694 m)
Jackson Peak	226089	Napa	1,811 feet (552 m)
Lemon Hill	227021	Napa	1,043 feet (318 m)
Little Sugarloaf Peak	227382	Napa	1,611 feet (491 m)
Okell Hill	229954	Napa	1,122 feet (342 m)
Red Hill	231332	Napa	2,133 feet (650 m)
Red Mountain	231348	Napa	1,368 feet (417 m)
Scribner Mountain	232749	Napa	1,903 feet (580 m)
Signal Hill	233111	Napa, Solano	2,382 feet (726 m)
Atlas Peak	233443	Napa	2,671 feet (814 m)
Castle Peak	233644	Napa	1,286 feet (392 m)
Haystack	233994	Napa	1,555 feet (474 m)
Snell Peak	234753	Napa	1,798 feet (548 m)
Sugarloaf	235646	Napa	1,637 feet (499 m)
Sugarloaf Mountain	235668	Napa	2,972 feet (906 m)
Sugarloaf Peak	235675	Napa	1,863 feet (568 m)
Table Mountain	235958	Napa	2,812 feet (857 m)
Table Rock	235963	Napa	2,369 feet (722 m)
The Beehive	236145	Napa	2,733 feet (833 m)
The Trees	236227	Napa	2,651 feet (808 m)
Three Peaks	236312	Napa	2,861 feet (872 m)
Turner Mountain	236659	Napa	1,788 feet (545 m)
Twin Peaks	236711	Napa	2,733 feet (833 m)
Veterans Peak	237062	Napa	1,168 feet (356 m)
Mount Saint John	253811	Napa	2,339 feet (713 m)
Mount Vaca	255187	Napa, Solano	2,812 feet (857 m)
Oat Hill	1656195	Napa	2,083 feet (635 m)
Bald Hill	1657977	Napa	1,670 feet (509 m)
Bismark Knob	1658063	Napa, Sonoma	2,277 feet (694 m)
Buck Mountain	1658152	Napa	2,031 feet (619 m)
Flat Top	1658547	Napa	2,730 feet (832 m)
Grassy Hill	1658655	Napa	2,415 feet (736 m)
Howell Mountain	1658790	Napa	1,863 feet (568 m)
Inspiration Point	1658826	Napa	2,172 feet (662 m)
Lookout Point	1659012	Napa	2,182 feet (665 m)
Old Baldy	1659287	Napa	2,743 feet (836 m)
Potato Hill	1659426	Napa	2,529 feet (771 m)
Sentinel Hill	1659626	Napa	1,890 feet (576 m)
Mount Veeder	1660094	Napa, Sonoma	2,680 feet (817 m)
Coyote Peak	1800266	Napa	1,132 feet (345 m)
Borel Hill	219661	San Mateo	2,523 feet (769 m)
Lane Hill	226851	San Mateo	1,227 feet (374 m)
Mount Melville	228485	San Mateo	2,205 feet (672 m)
Mindego Hill	228783	San Mateo	2,142 feet (653 m)
San Bruno Mountain	232381	San Mateo	1,299 feet (396 m)
North Peak	234383	San Mateo	1,886 feet (575 m)
Scarpet Peak	234657	San Mateo	1,932 feet (589 m)
Bald Knob	238918	San Mateo	2,093 feet (638 m)
Morena Sierra	253851	San Mateo	2,398 feet (731 m)
Windy Hill	255241	San Mateo	1,919 feet (585 m)
South Peak	277455	San Mateo	1,847 feet (563 m)
Burns Chalks	1658179	San Mateo	1,066 feet (325 m)
Goat Hill	1658625	San Mateo	1,161 feet (354 m)
Haskins Hill	1658718	San Mateo	1,168 feet (356 m)
Kelly Hill	1658890	San Mateo	1,821 feet (555 m)
Langley Hill	1658937	San Mateo	2,221 feet (677 m)
San Pedro Mountain	1659588	San Mateo	1,060 feet (323 m)
Skeggs Point	1659674	San Mateo	2,300 feet (701 m)
Montara Knob	1659760	San Mateo	1,647 feet (502 m)
Ox Hill	1659771	San Mateo	1,745 feet (532 m)
Peak Mountain	1659774	San Mateo	1,827 feet (557 m)
Teague Hill	1659962	San Mateo	2,018 feet (615 m)
Alum Rock	218197	Santa Clara	1,854 feet (565 m)
Atherton Peak	218446	Santa Clara	1,608 feet (490 m)
Baby Peak	218494	Santa Clara	2,723 feet (830 m)
Bald Mountain	218584	Santa Clara	2,385 feet (727 m)
Mount Bielawski	219122	Santa Clara	3,228 feet (984 m)
Bills Hill	219296	Santa Clara	1,949 feet (594 m)
Black Mountain	1658069	Santa Clara	3,747 feet (1,142 m)
Black Mountain	1658068	Santa Clara	2,805 feet (855 m)
Black Mountain	219375	Santa Clara	3,839 feet (1,170 m)
Blue Rocks	219522	Santa Clara	2,405 feet (733 m)
Brush Mountain	219933	Santa Clara	2,861 feet (872 m)
Burra Burra Peak	220241	Santa Clara	2,280 feet (695 m)
Castle Rock	220692	Santa Clara	3,169 feet (966 m)
Mount Chual	221096	Santa Clara	3,478 feet (1,060 m)
Collords Peak	2582460	Santa Clara	2,408 feet (734 m)
Cow Hill	221704	Santa Clara	3,238 feet (987 m)
Coyote Peak	221759	Santa Clara	1,152 feet (351 m)
Mount Day	222070	Santa Clara	3,819 feet (1,164 m)
El Toro	223063	Santa Clara	1,289 feet (393 m)
Elephant Head	223084	Santa Clara	1,890 feet (576 m)
Ewing Hill	223304	Santa Clara	1,250 feet (381 m)
Eylar Mountain	223311	Santa Clara	3,996 feet (1,218 m)
Fern Peak	223464	Santa Clara	1,676 feet (511 m)
Gulnac Peak	224735	Santa Clara	2,260 feet (689 m)
Hagerman Peak	224777	Santa Clara	1,768 feet (539 m)
Mount Helen	225124	Santa Clara	2,992 feet (912 m)
Lands End	226847	Santa Clara	2,546 feet (776 m)
Larios Peak	226875	Santa Clara	2,746 feet (837 m)
Laurel Hill	226946	Santa Clara	1,109 feet (338 m)
Mount Lewis	227049	Santa Clara	3,730 feet (1,137 m)
Lions Peak	227177	Santa Clara	1,115 feet (340 m)
Loma Chiquita	227487	Santa Clara	2,598 feet (792 m)
Loma Prieta	227488	Santa Clara	3,766 feet (1,148 m)
Lovers Leap	227737	Santa Clara	1,020 feet (311 m)
Mount Madonna	227925	Santa Clara	1,900 feet (579 m)
Masters Hill	228209	Santa Clara	2,447 feet (746 m)
Mount Misery	228829	Santa Clara	2,461 feet (750 m)
Mount Mocho	228887	Santa Clara	3,665 feet (1,117 m)
Monument Peak	228992	Santa Clara, Alameda	2,520 feet (768 m)
Nibbs Knob	229529	Santa Clara	2,644 feet (806 m)
Pacheco Peak	230197	Santa Clara	2,677 feet (816 m)
Mount Pajaro	230245	Santa Clara	1,575 feet (480 m)
Panochita Hill	230288	Santa Clara	1,883 feet (574 m)
Pine Springs Hill	1659396	Santa Clara	2,359 feet (719 m)
Pyramid Rock	231109	Santa Clara	3,973 feet (1,211 m)
Round Mountain	231959	Santa Clara	3,081 feet (939 m)
Saint Josephs Hill	232190	Santa Clara	1,240 feet (378 m)
Mount Sizer	233189	Santa Clara	3,202 feet (976 m)
Mount Stakes	235352	Santa Clara	3,796 feet (1,157 m)
Sugarloaf Mountain	235667	Santa Clara	2,772 feet (845 m)
Table Mountain	235956	Santa Clara	1,854 feet (565 m)
Mount Thayer	236142	Santa Clara	3,478 feet (1,060 m)
Twin Peaks	236708	Santa Clara	1,486 feet (453 m)
Mount Umunhum	236770	Santa Clara	3,478 feet (1,060 m)
Vasquez Peak	237034	Santa Clara	2,201 feet (671 m)
Willson Peak	237981	Santa Clara	2,648 feet (807 m)
Crystal Peak	252331	Santa Clara	3,592 feet (1,095 m)
El Sereno	253720	Santa Clara	2,523 feet (769 m)
El Sombroso	253721	Santa Clara	3,005 feet (916 m)
Mount Isabel	254824	Santa Clara	4,193 feet (1,278 m)
Table Mountain	1656353	Santa Clara	2,037 feet (621 m)
The Peak	1656361	Santa Clara	2,995 feet (913 m)
Bald Peaks	1657984	Santa Clara	1,631 feet (497 m)
Bear Mountain	1658016	Santa Clara	2,477 feet (755 m)
Bollinger Mountain	1658100	Santa Clara	3,428 feet (1,045 m)
Church Hill	1658278	Santa Clara	1,460 feet (445 m)
Mount Hamilton – Copernicus Peak	1658314	Santa Clara	4,367 feet (1,331 m)
Mount Hamilton	224848	Santa Clara	4,196 feet (1,279 m)
Elephant Mountain	1658486	Santa Clara	1,148 feet (350 m)
Kickham Peak	1658901	Santa Clara	2,336 feet (712 m)
Mine Hill	1659138	Santa Clara	1,706 feet (520 m)
Pigeon Point	1659387	Santa Clara	1,594 feet (486 m)
Rattlesnake Butte	1659470	Santa Clara	3,156 feet (962 m)
Red Mountain	1659483	Santa Clara	3,658 feet (1,115 m)
Rock Springs Peak	1659533	Santa Clara	2,303 feet (702 m)
Bear Creek Summit	1834928	Santa Clara	2,415 feet (736 m)
Mount Van Lone	1835433	Santa Clara	2,067 feet (630 m)
Sulphur Springs Mountain	235737	Solano, Napa	1,086 feet (331 m)
Twin Sisters	236718	Solano	2,162 feet (659 m)
Putnam Peak	253799	Solano	1,145 feet (349 m)
Bald Mountain – Southern Summit	218588	Sonoma, Napa	2,257 feet (688 m)
Bald Mountain – Northern Summit	218589	Sonoma, Napa	2,730 feet (832 m)
Bennett Mountain	219046	Sonoma	1,880 feet (573 m)
Big Hill	219196	Sonoma	1,040 feet (317 m)
Big Mountain	219219	Sonoma	2,654 feet (809 m)
Big Oat Mountain	219224	Sonoma	1,371 feet (418 m)
Black Mountain	219378	Sonoma	1,617 feet (493 m)
Black Mountain	219379	Sonoma	2,549 feet (777 m)
Black Rock	219401	Sonoma	1,302 feet (397 m)
Bradford Mountain	219761	Sonoma	1,224 feet (373 m)
Buck Knoll	219992	Sonoma	2,057 feet (627 m)
Buck Mountain	219996	Sonoma	1,483 feet (452 m)
Bummer Peak	220145	Sonoma	1,138 feet (347 m)
Buzzard Peak	220316	Sonoma	1,519 feet (463 m)
Castle Rock	220698	Sonoma	2,638 feet (804 m)
Centennial Mountain	220814	Sonoma	2,451 feet (747 m)
Chalk Point	220886	Sonoma	2,192 feet (668 m)
Diamond Mountain	222352	Sonoma	2,349 feet (716 m)
Fern Mountain	223462	Sonoma	1,614 feet (492 m)
Fuller Mountain	223984	Sonoma	1,384 feet (422 m)
Geyser Peak	224140	Sonoma	3,455 feet (1,053 m)
Hogback Mountain	225428	Sonoma	1,631 feet (497 m)
Mount Hood	225529	Sonoma	2,664 feet (812 m)
Mount Jackson	226103	Sonoma	1,476 feet (450 m)
McCray Mountain	228333	Sonoma	1,919 feet (585 m)
Moon Mountain	2501758	Sonoma	1,739 feet (530 m)
Oak Mountain	229868	Sonoma	1,654 feet (504 m)
Pilot Knob	230661	Sonoma	2,231 feet (680 m)
Pine Hill	230697	Sonoma	1,516 feet (462 m)
Pine Mountain	230709	Sonoma	3,579 feet (1,091 m)
Mount Pisgah	230779	Sonoma	1,240 feet (378 m)
Pocket Peak	230840	Sonoma	2,215 feet (675 m)
Pole Mountain	230899	Sonoma	2,195 feet (669 m)
Queens Peak	231134	Sonoma	1,916 feet (584 m)
Red Hill	231331	Sonoma	1,043 feet (318 m)
Red Hill	231333	Sonoma	2,520 feet (768 m)
Red Mountain	231347	Sonoma	2,536 feet (773 m)
Red Mountain	231349	Sonoma	1,480 feet (451 m)
Red Mountain	231350	Sonoma	1,814 feet (553 m)
Redwood Mountain	231444	Sonoma	1,673 feet (510 m)
Rocky Mountain	231776	Sonoma	1,444 feet (440 m)
Mount Saint Helena	232163	Sonoma	4,327 feet (1,319 m)
Sky High	233216	Sonoma	2,047 feet (624 m)
Morris Peak	234333	Sonoma	1,844 feet (562 m)
Sonoma Mountain	234886	Sonoma	2,287 feet (697 m)
Sugarloaf	235647	Sonoma	1,148 feet (350 m)
Sugarloaf	235649	Sonoma	1,634 feet (498 m)
Sugarloaf Hill	235661	Sonoma	1,667 feet (508 m)
Table Mountain	235957	Sonoma	1,581 feet (482 m)
Tater Knoll	236036	Sonoma	1,565 feet (477 m)
Taylor Mountain	236050	Sonoma	1,404 feet (428 m)
The Island	236185	Sonoma	1,204 feet (367 m)
The Nubble	236206	Sonoma	1,148 feet (350 m)
Wild Hog Hill	237754	Sonoma	1,096 feet (334 m)
Black Mountain	255362	Sonoma	3,117 feet (950 m)
Black Mountain	257133	Sonoma	1,316 feet (401 m)
Devils Ribs	1655966	Sonoma	1,896 feet (578 m)
Fox Mountain	1656033	Sonoma	1,342 feet (409 m)
Little Black Mountain	1656130	Sonoma	1,972 feet (601 m)
Little Oat Mountain	1656133	Sonoma	1,381 feet (421 m)
Rabbit Knoll	1656239	Sonoma	1,617 feet (493 m)
Pritchett Peaks	1656295	Sonoma	1,699 feet (518 m)
The Island	1656360	Sonoma	1,204 feet (367 m)
Bald Hill	1657978	Sonoma	1,496 feet (456 m)
Buck Mountain	1658151	Sonoma	2,096 feet (639 m)
Burned Mountain	1658176	Sonoma	2,969 feet (905 m)
Chalk Mountain	1658255	Sonoma	1,404 feet (428 m)
Cooks Peak	1658311	Sonoma	1,106 feet (337 m)
Crane Peak	1658344	Sonoma	2,398 feet (731 m)
Lookout Point	1659013	Sonoma	1,230 feet (375 m)
Lookout Rock	1659014	Sonoma	1,929 feet (588 m)
Oak Knolls	1659270	Sonoma	1,109 feet (338 m)
Red Hill	1659480	Sonoma	1,965 feet (599 m)
Redwood Hill	1659490	Sonoma	1,109 feet (338 m)
Rocky Mountain	1659536	Sonoma	1,719 feet (524 m)
Sugarloaf	1659900	Sonoma	1,663 feet (507 m)
Telegraph Hill	1659966	Sonoma	1,270 feet (387 m)
Mount Tom	1660013	Sonoma	2,484 feet (757 m)
White Mountain	1660167	Sonoma	1,850 feet (564 m)
Montara Mountain	1659761	San Mateo	1,916 feet (584 m)
Rose Peak	2677924	Alameda	3,812 feet (1,162 m)
Discovery Peak	2677923	Alameda	3,842 feet (1,171 m)
Brushy Peaks	1799570	Sonoma, Napa	2,205 feet (672 m)

== See also ==
- List of highest points in California by county
- List of hills in San Francisco
- List of mountain peaks of California
