= Chesbro Lake =

Chesbro Reservoir
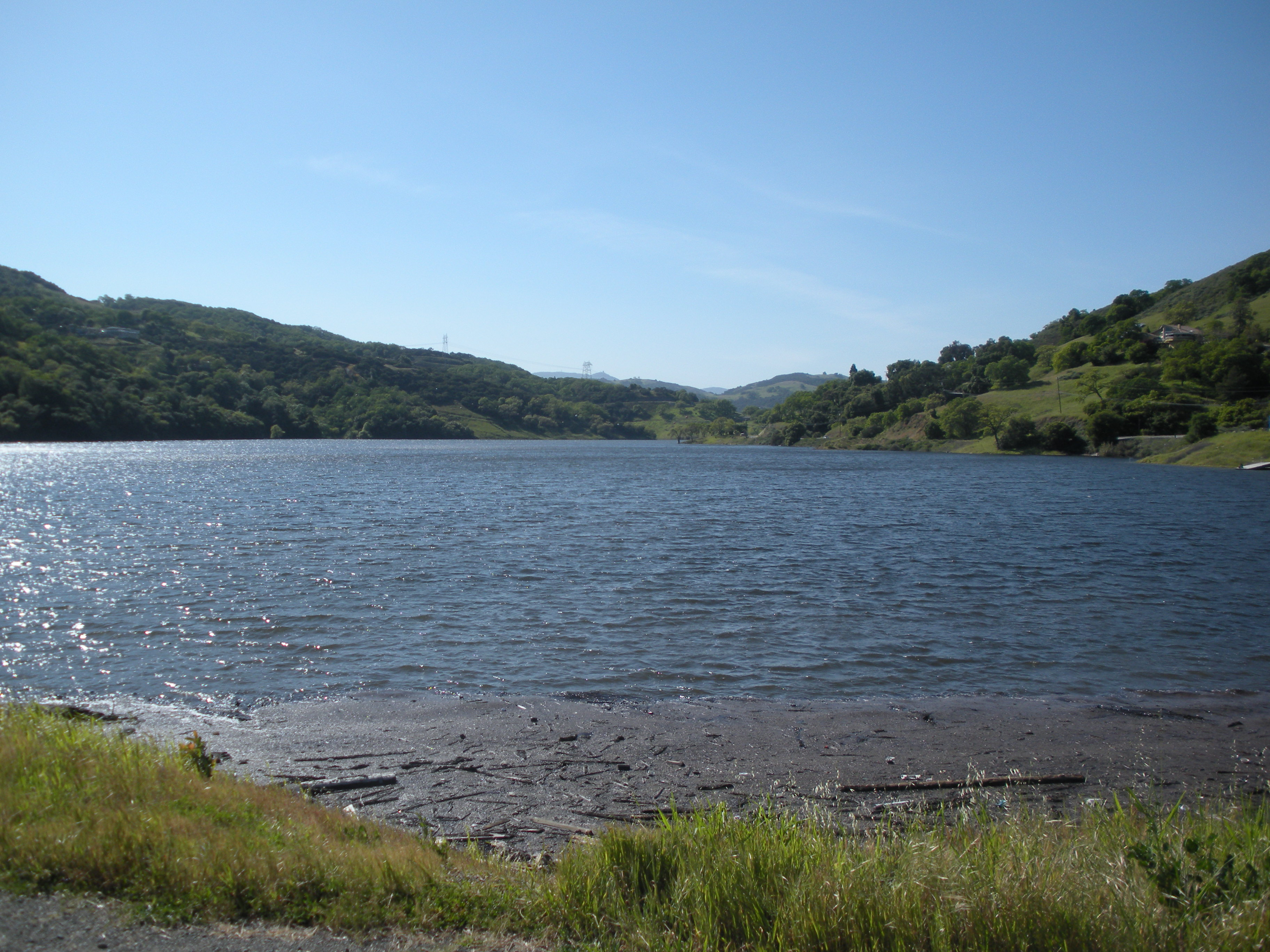
- April 2010

- Location within California Location within the United States
- Location: Santa Clara County, California
- Coordinates: 37°7′21″N 121°42′40″W
- Type: reservoir
- Primary inflows: Llagas Creek
- Primary outflows: Llagas Creek
- Catchment area: 19.5 sq mi (51 km^{2})
- Basin countries: United States
- Managing agency: Santa Clara Valley Water District
- Surface area: 328 acres (1.33 km^{2})
- Water volume: 8,086 acre⋅ft (0.010 km^{3})
- Surface elevation: 531 ft (162 m)

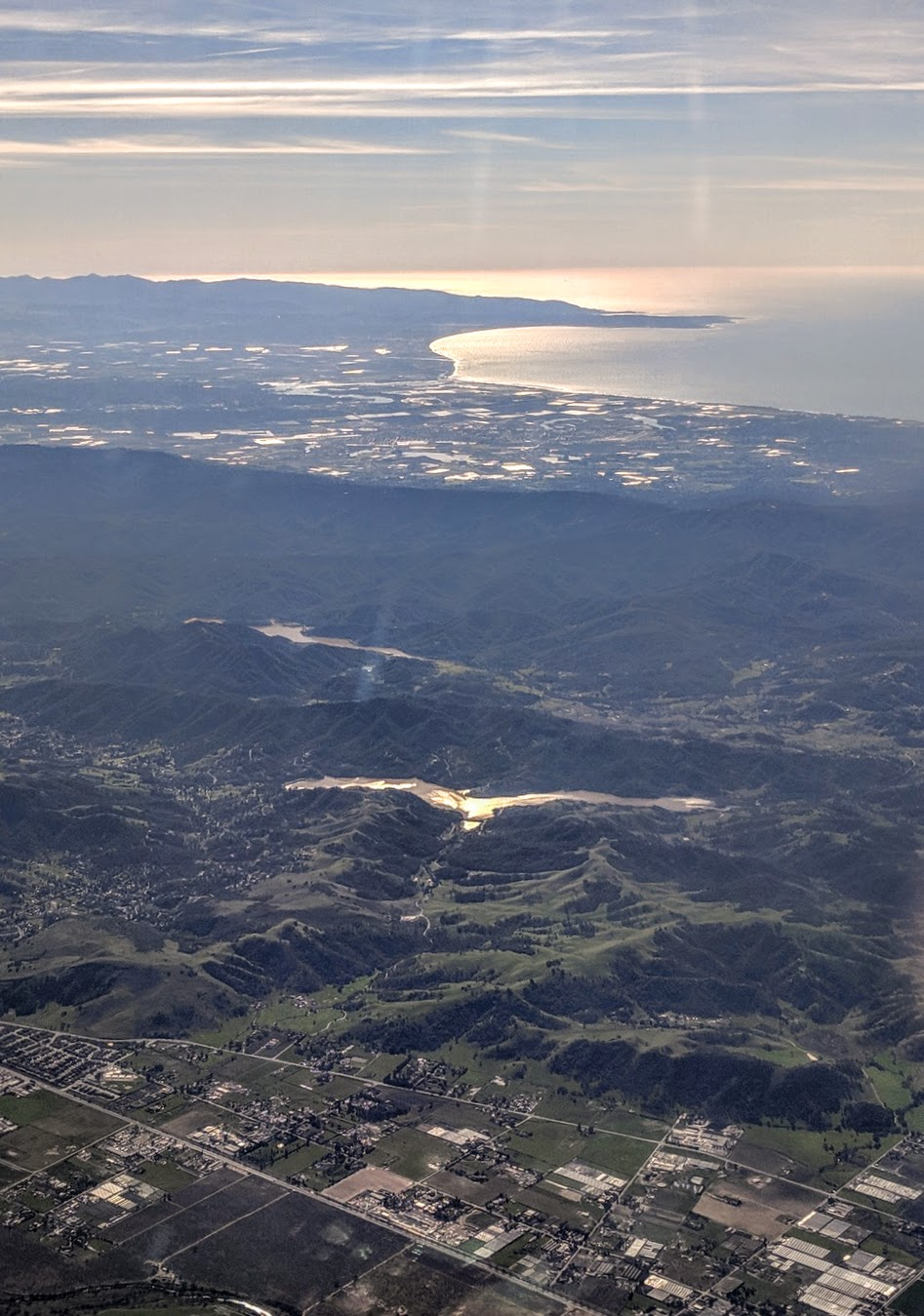
Chesbro Reservoir and Monterey Bay, aerial view from over south San Jose area

Chesbro Reservoir is an artificial lake located three miles (5 km) west of Morgan Hill, California, in the United States. A 232-acre (94 ha) county park surrounds the reservoir and provides limited fishing ("catch-and-release"), picnicking, and hiking activities. Swimming and boating are not permitted in the reservoir.

== History ==
The reservoir was created in 1955 by the construction of the Elmer J. Chesbro Dam across Llagas Creek in the valley west of El Toro peak. The reservoir and dam were named after Elmer J. Chesbro, a local doctor who was president of the Santa Clara Valley Water Conservation District (now the Santa Clara Valley Water District) at the time.

== See also ==
- List of dams and reservoirs in California
- List of lakes in California
- List of lakes in the San Francisco Bay Area
