= Tar Creek (Santa Clara County) =

Tar Creek Tar Spring Creek, La Brea Creek
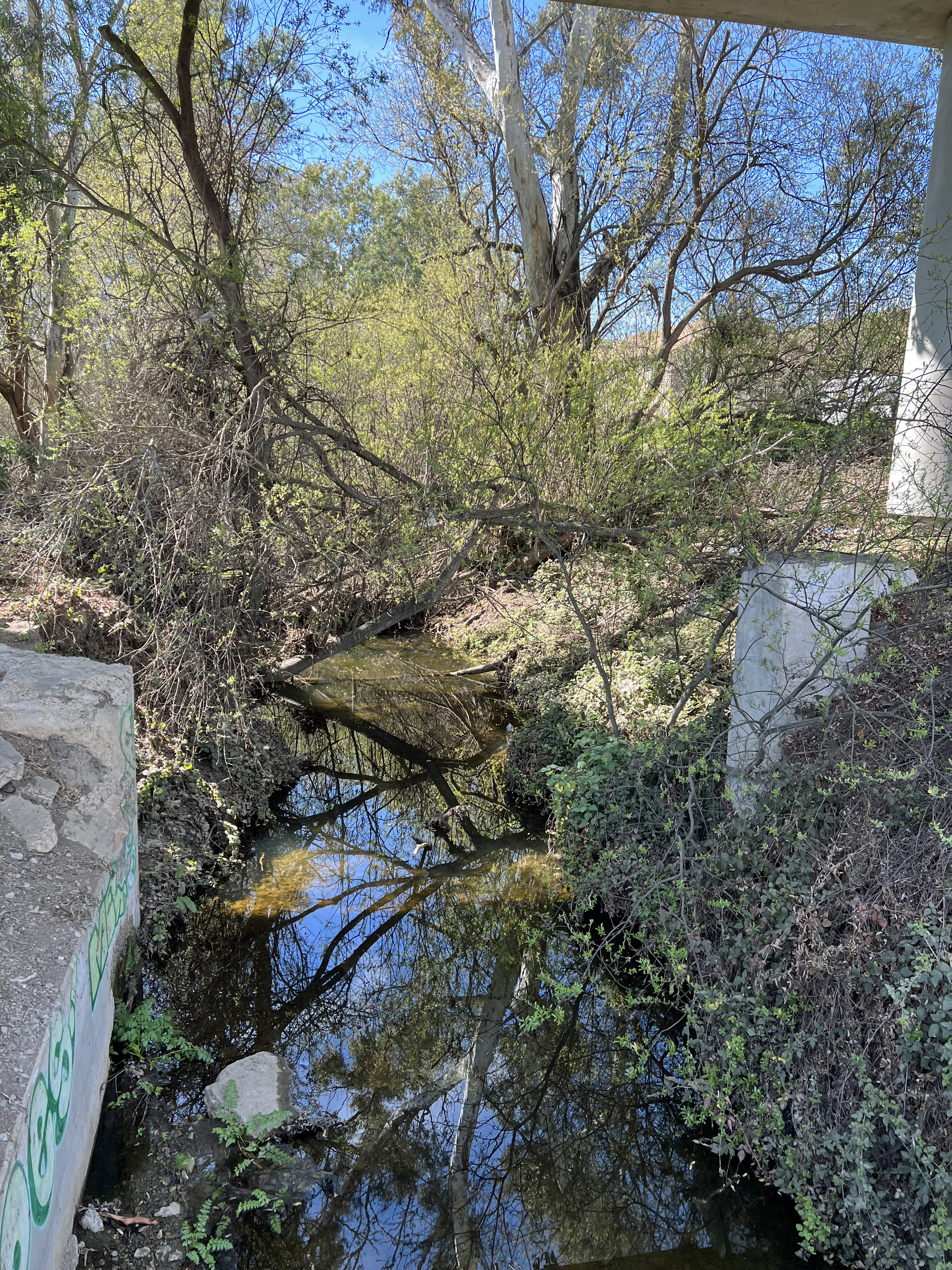
- Tar Creek looking west from Union Pacific Railroad undercrossing beneath U.S. Highway 101, March 2022

Location
- Country: United States
- State: California
- Region: Santa Clara County
- City: Gilroy, California

Physical characteristics
- Source: Eastern flank of the southern Santa Cruz Mountains
  - coordinates: 36°58′38″N 121°37′03″W
  - elevation: 1,676 ft (511 m)
- Mouth: Confluence with lower Uvas Creek, also known as Carnadero Creek
  - location: Sargent, Santa Clara County, California
  - coordinates: 36°55′48″N 121°32′30″W
  - elevation: 128 ft (39 m)
- Length: 29.5 mi (47.5 km)

Tar Creek is an 8-mile-long (13 km) mainly southeastward-flowing stream originating on the eastern slopes of the Santa Cruz Mountains, in southern Santa Clara County, California, United States. Tar Creek flows through the Sargent Ranch, once the Rancho Juristac Mexican Land grant. It crosses under U.S. Highway 101 and about 5 miles (8.0 km) south of Gilroy, California joins lower Uvas Creek (known in its lower reach as Carnadero Creek). From the Tar Creek confluence, lower Uvas /Carnardero Creek flows shortly south to its confluence with the Pajaro River at the Santa Clara County - San Benito County boundary.

== History ==
California's coastal counties have extensive deposits of asphaltum or bitumen are found, including in Santa Clara County's Tar Creek watershed, likely resulting in the creek's name Tar Creek and alternatively, Tar Spring Creek. Tar Creek was also historically known as La Brea Creek, "la brea" being Spanish for "the pitch".

Beginning in the 1860s Tar Creek's "La Brea Canyon" was prospected for oil. By 1914, hundreds of thousand of barrels of oil had been shipped from the Sargent Oil Field by the Watsonville Oil Company and Sargent's Ranch Oil Company.

== Watershed ==
Upper Tar Creek flows southeast out of Wildcat Canyon, then flows south over Castro Valley where it is bisected by Castro Valley Road. From there, the creek flows south then west through the Sargent Ranch towards U.S. Highway 101 where it crosses beneath the freeway in a large viaduct shared with the Union Pacific Railroad. This used to be a Southern Pacific Railroad station known as Corporal, California.

== Ecology ==
California red-legged frogs (Rana draytonii) are a federally threatened species and are known to breed in stock ponds on the greater Sargent Ranch property. Although California tiger salamanders (Ambystoma californiense) are known to breed in stock ponds to the north of Tar Creek.

A pair of tule elk (Cervus canadensis nannodes) bulls were sighted by a Santa Clara County Parks Ranger in mid-November 2021 just north of Tar Creek and just west of U.S. Highway 101. These elk, from the established herds in the Diablo Range, are the first elk known to have passed west of Highway 101 to the southern Santa Cruz Mountains. Highway 101 had historically been a complete barrier to westward expansion of the elk herds in eastern Santa Clara County as illustrated by the lack of elk-vehicle collisions on this freeway in a study from 2016 to 2020 by the Road Ecology Center at the University of California at Davis.

== See also ==
- Uvas Creek
- Pajaro River
