= Mount Chual =

Mountain in California, United States

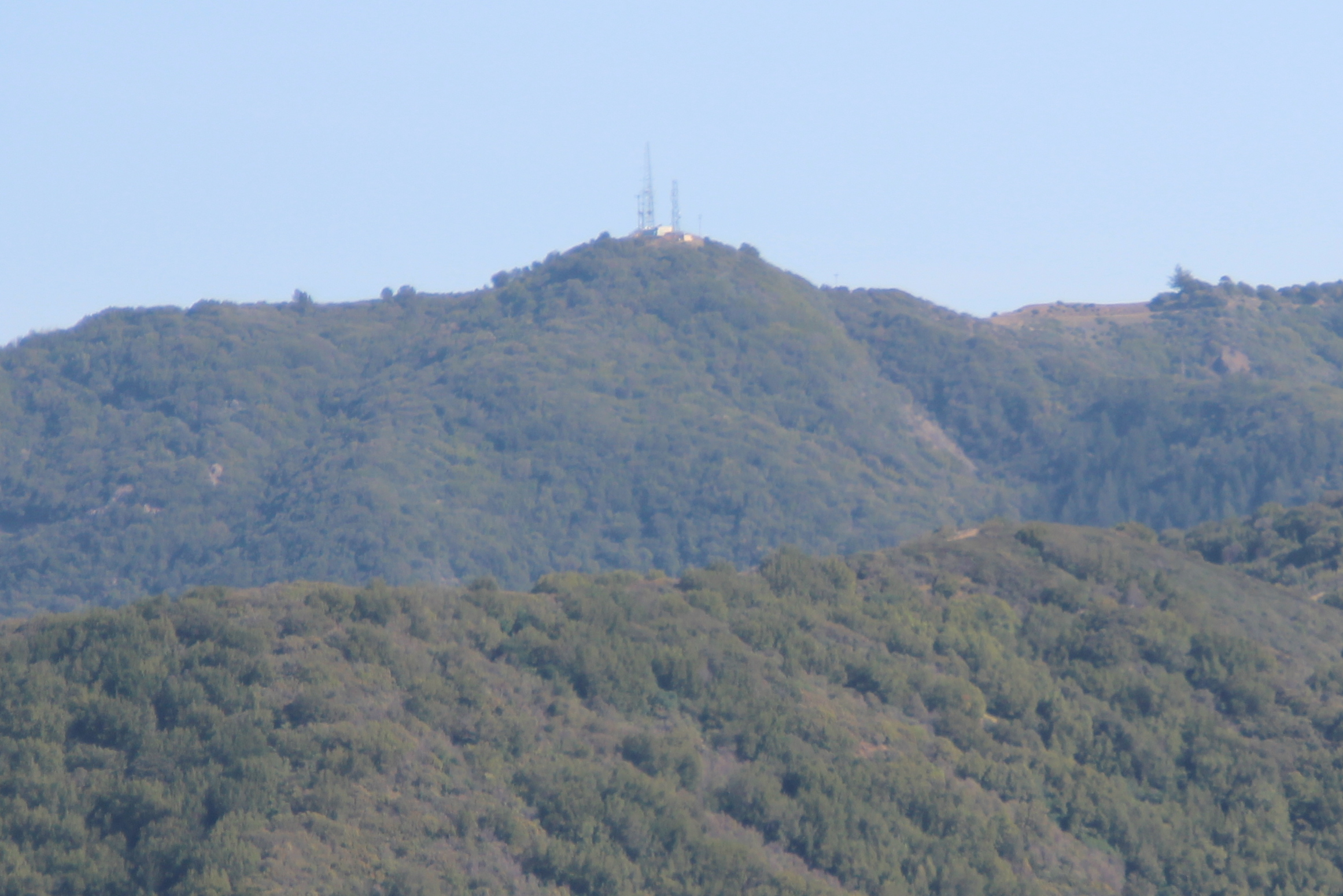
- Mount Chual seen from the Sierra Azul Open Space Preserve

Highest point
- Elevation: 3,562 ft (1,086 m) NGVD 29
- Coordinates: 37°07′09″N 121°50′05″W

Geography
- Location within California Location within the United States
- Location: Santa Clara County, California, United States
- Parent range: Santa Cruz Mountains
- Topo map: USGS Loma Prieta

Mount Chual is a prominent peak in the Santa Cruz Mountains in southwest Santa Clara County, California, United States. The landmark lies 10 mi (16 km) west of Morgan Hill, and approximately 0.8 mi (1 km) northeast of Loma Prieta. It is the third highest peak in the Santa Cruz Mountains. Several tributaries to Llagas Creek originate on the southern and eastern flanks of the peak.

== History ==
The name of the mountain first appeared on a Mexican-era map of New Almaden in 1848 as Picacho de Chual. Chual is a Mexican Spanish word for goosefoot (Chenopodium album), derived from Nahuatl tzoalli.

The summit has a radio communications facility, operating since 1965. The peak and surrounding land is currently owned by the Santa Clara Valley Open Space Authority.

== See also ==
- List of summits of the San Francisco Bay Area
