= Llagas Creek =

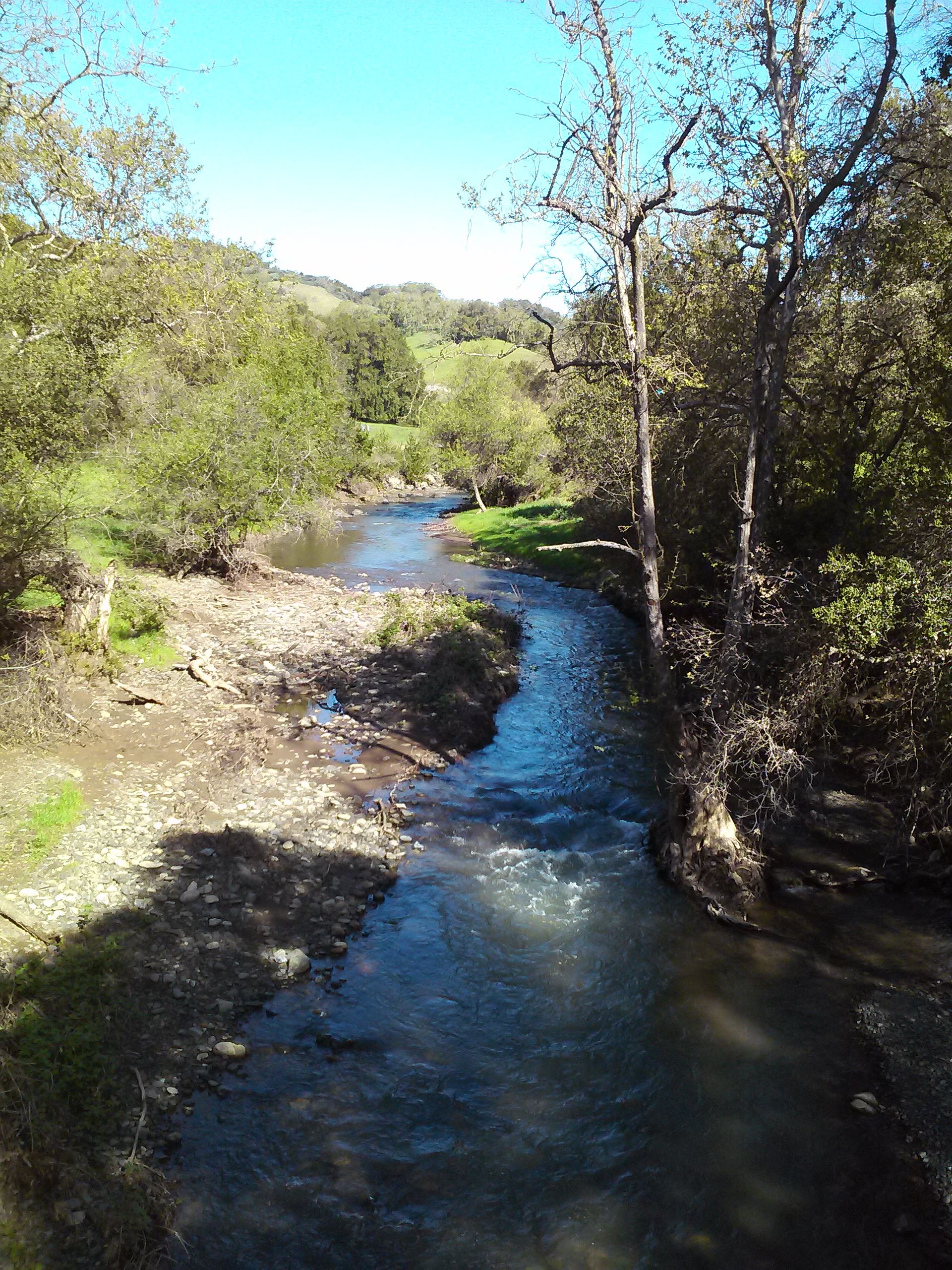
- Llagas Creek near Oak Glen Avenue, March 2017

- Location of the mouth of Llagas Creek at its confluence with the Pajaro River

Location
- Country: United States
- State: California
- Region: Santa Clara County
- City: Gilroy, California

Physical characteristics
- Source: Southeast side of summit of Mount Chual in the Santa Cruz Mountains
  - coordinates: 37°06′59″N 121°50′02″W
  - elevation: 3,360 ft (1,020 m)
- Mouth: Confluence with Pajaro River just after passing through lower Miller Slough
  - coordinates: 36°57′50″N 121°30′28″W
  - elevation: 141 ft (43 m)

Basin features
- Tributaries
  - left: Twin Falls Creek, Baldy Ryan Canyon, Heron Creek, Tilton Creek, Paradise Creek, East Little Llagas Creek, Church Creek, Skillet Creek, Panther Creek, Live Oak Creek, Alamias Creek
  - right: Cañada Garcia Creek, Machado Creek, Hayes Creek, Lions Creek, Princevalle Drain, Miller Slough

Llagas Creek is a 32.8 miles (52.8 km) east -and southeast-flowing perennial stream that drains the eastern foothills of the southern Santa Cruz Mountains in Santa Clara County, California, United States. It is one of the three main tributaries to the upper Pajaro River watershed (Pacheco Creek, Llagas Creek, and Uvas-Carnadero Creek), which then flows to Monterey Bay and the Pacific Ocean.

== History ==
Padre Francisco Palóu named a place near the creek "Las Llagas de Nuestro Padre San Francisco", meaning "The Wounds [stigmata] of Our Father Saint Francis", on November 24, 1774, while on Captain Rivera's expedition to San Francisco. The Rancho San Francisco de las Llagas was a Mexican land grant given in 1834 by Governor José Figueroa to Carlos Antonio Castro.

== Watershed and Course ==
The source of Llagas Creek rise southeast of the summit of 3,573 feet (1,089 m) Mount Chual about 0.7 miles (1.1 km) northeast of Loma Prieta in the southern Santa Cruz Mountains. Headwaters flow 10.3 miles (16.6 km) from Mount Chual and 3,599 feet (1,097 m) Crystal Peak first east, then northeast along Casa Loma Road, until reaching Uvas Road, then turning south to Chesbro Reservoir. After crossing 2.3 miles (3.7 km) east across Chesbro Reservoir, Llagas Creek continues 20.2 miles (32.5 km) past the cities of Morgan Hill, San Martin, and Gilroy to eventually join the Pajaro River at the Santa Clara and San Benito County line.

The lower Llagas Creek, south of Gilroy, passes through a system of percolation ponds (Lower Miller Slough) which are used to treat wastewater in the area.

== Ecology ==
The Santa Clara Valley Habitat Plan cites the presence of federally threatened (since 1996) California red-legged frog (Rana draytonii) and federally threatened (as of 2026) northwestern pond turtle (Actinemys marmorata). The federally threatened Central California distinct population segment (DPS) of foothill yellow‐legged frog (Rana boylii) was recorded on Llagas Creek in a 2016–2023 survey at Rancho Cañada del Oro Open Space Preserve.

Llagas Creek also hosts run of federally threatened anadromous South Central California Coast steelhead trout (Oncorhynchus mykiss), although the Chesbro Reservoir dam is an impassable barrier to spawning runs further upstream.

Although there is no longer a stable population of least Bell’s vireo (Vireo bellii pusillus) on Llagas Creek, occasional sightings have kept it on the SCVHP as a covered species.

== See also ==
- Riparian zone
- List of watercourses in the San Francisco Bay Area
