= El Toro (California) =

Hill in the state of California

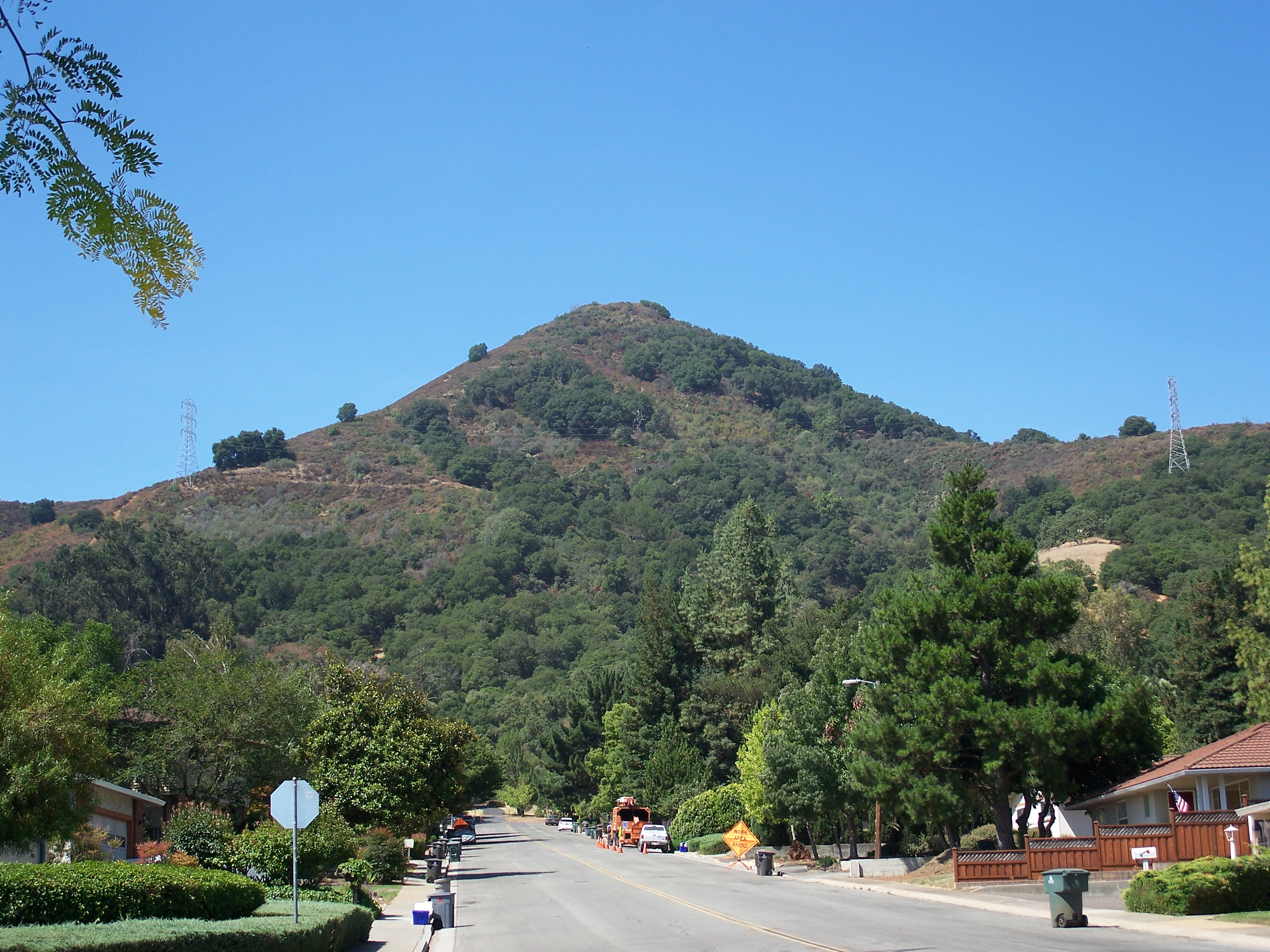

Highest point
- Elevation: 1,427 ft (435 m) NAVD 88
- Prominence: 1,077 ft (328 m)
- Coordinates: 37°07′14″N 121°40′24″W

Geography
- Location within California
- Location: Morgan Hill, California, U.S.
- Parent range: Santa Cruz Mountains
- Topo map: USGS El Toro

El Toro (Spanish for "The Bull") is a prominent hill located along the eastern foothills of the Santa Cruz Mountains in southwest Santa Clara County, California. The iconic landmark is partially owned by the city of Morgan Hill, and its silhouette is incorporated into the city logo.

== History ==
According to local legend, 19th-century American poet Bret Harte named the hill when he climbed it and discovered two bulls fighting near the summit (they subsequently chased him back down).

== Hiking ==
Although a portion of the hill is on public land, access to the summit is through privately owned surrounding lands.

Since 2008, the Morgan Hill Historical Society has sponsored annual spring hikes up to the summit. However, due to increased contention over property rights, no public hikes to the summit have been permitted since 2011.

In 2012, the Morgan Hill Parks and Recreation Commission re-initiated a study started a decade earlier to create a public trail to the summit. The results of the study and proposal for the trail are available on the Commission's website.

In 2013, the Commission held the first of a series of public meetings on the proposal to create the trail and associated facilities nearby.

In 2015, an "Access Strategy" to determine the proposed trail access points was developed by the Commission and approved by the City Council.

In 2016, the Commission will hold a public meeting on the proposal to create a non-paved public trail on the eastern side of El Toro and to address concerns about safety, parking, litter, and impacts on wildlife.

== See also ==
- List of summits of the San Francisco Bay Area
