= Loma Fire =

2016 wildfire in California

- Part of the 2016 California wildfires
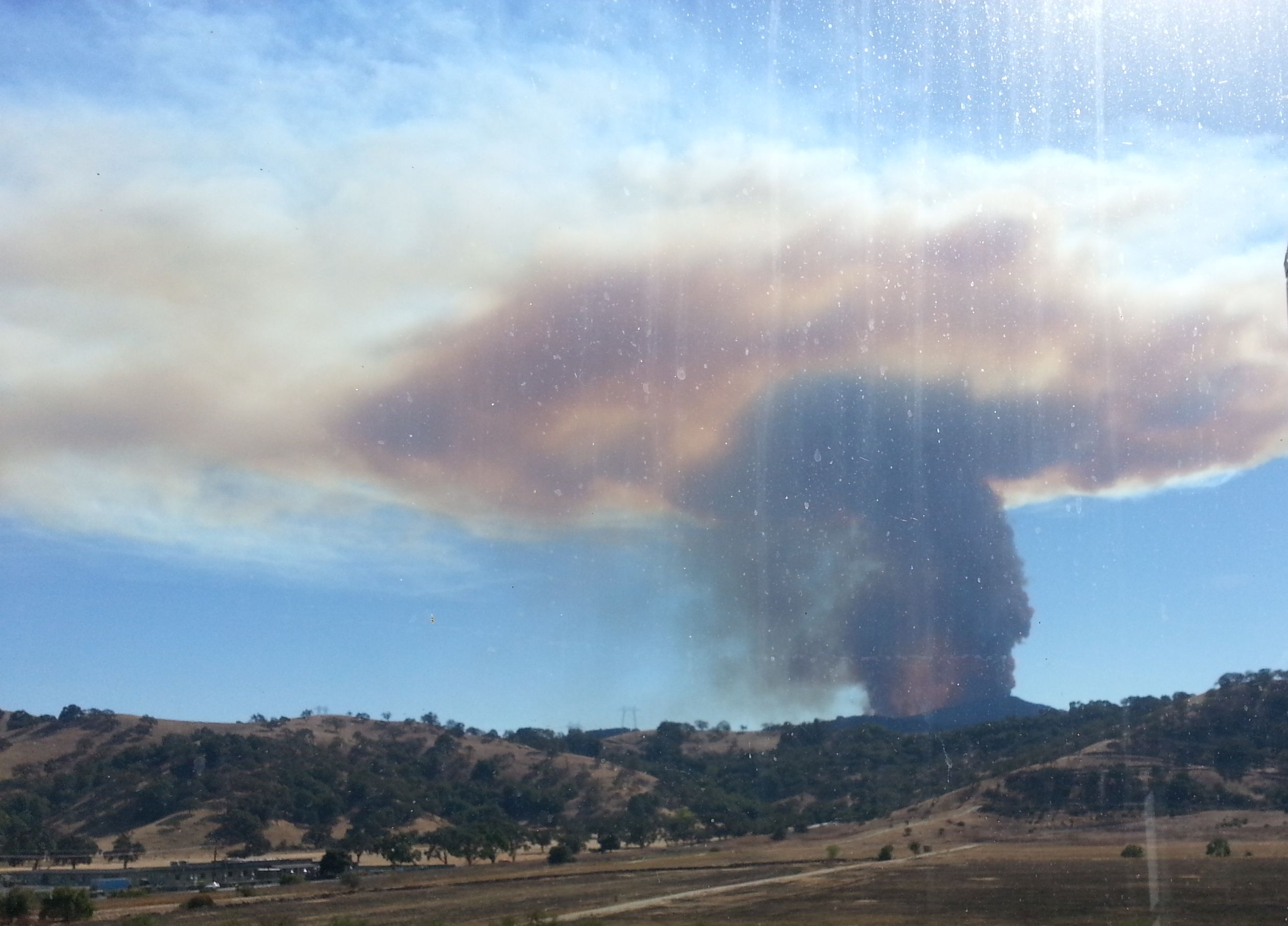
- Loma Fire, seen from 9 miles away, 30 minutes after the fire started
- Date: September 26, 2016 –; October 12, 2016
- Location: Loma Prieta, Santa Clara County, California
- Coordinates: 37.10632°N 121.85318°W

Statistics
- Burned area: 4,474 acres (18 km^{2})

Impacts
- Structures lost: 12 single residences; 16 outbuildings

Ignition
- Cause: Sparks from portable generator

Map
- Location of fire in Northern California Loma Fire (the United States)

The Loma Fire was a wildfire that broke out on September 26, 2016, in the Santa Cruz Mountains in Santa Clara County, California. By the time the fire was contained on October 12, the fire had burned 4,474 acres (18 km^{2}) of land and had destroyed 12 residences and 16 outbuildings.

With the containment of the fire, and rainstorms due in the area, concerns turned to the potential for mudslides in the area. With vegetation that previously held together the soil on the mountain having burned in the fire, the erosion effects of the upcoming rains are heightened. Erosion repair efforts are being coordinated by the Santa Clara County Office of Emergency Services.

According to CalFire officials, the fire was caused by sparks from a portable generator used in marijuana cultivation operations off Loma Chiquita Road.
