= South Santa Clara Valley, California =

Unincorporated community in California, United States

South Santa Clara Valley
- census county division (CCD)
- Location in the United States
- Coordinates: 37°3′17″N 121°34′40″W
- Country: United States
- State: California
- County: Santa Clara

Area
  - Total: 117.764 sq mi (305.007 km^{2})
  - Land: 117.145 sq mi (303.404 km^{2})
  - Water: 0.619 sq mi (1.603 km^{2}) 0.005%
- Elevation: 236 ft (72 m)

Population (2010)
  - Total: 103,477
  - Density: 883.325/sq mi (341.054/km^{2})
- Time zone: UTC-8 (PST)
  - Summer (DST): UTC-7 (PDT)
- ZIP code(s): 95046, 95038, 95037, 95020
- Area code: 408
- FIPS code: 06-08593175
- GNIS feature ID: 2583195

South Santa Clara Valley is a census county division (CCD) located in south Santa Clara County, California, United States. Commonly known as South Valley, the area covers approximately 118 square miles (310 km^{2}), and includes the cities of Morgan Hill, San Martin, and Gilroy as well as their immediate outlying unincorporated areas. The area is bounded by Coyote to the north, Llagas-Uvas to the west, Diablo Range to the east, and San Benito County to the south.

As of the 2010 US Census, the population was 103,477 residents of whom 47.0% were Hispanic, 40.8% non-Hispanic white, 7.6% Asian, and 4.6% of other races, with a median age of 40.5 years old.

Most residents and businesses in the area use postal zip codes from neighboring cities of Morgan Hill, San Martin, and Gilroy. The telephone area code is 408.

== Climate ==
The region lies in the southern part of Santa Clara Valley, and supports a relatively mild Mediterranean climate.
