= Discovery Peak =

Mountain in the American state of California

Highest point
- Elevation: 3,849 ft (1,173 m) NAVD 88
- Prominence: 1,086 ft (331 m)
- Listing: California county high points 46th
- Coordinates: 37°30′44″N 121°41′57″W

Geography
- Location within California
- Location: Alameda County, California, U.S.
- Parent range: Diablo Range
- Topo map: USGS Mendenhall Springs

Climbing
- Easiest route: Trail hike

Discovery Peak is a peak in the Diablo Range of California and is the highest point in Alameda County. The officially unnamed peak is also known as Valpe Ridge–Rose Flat due to its location near Rose Flat. The area is high enough to receive occasional snowfall during the winter, which generally melts within a few days of falling. Although it is on private property, the Ohlone Wilderness Trail, in Sunol Regional Wilderness, comes to within about 1 mile (1.6 km) of the summit.

== History ==
Discovery Peak was named in 1991 after it was "discovered" by highpointer Dinesh Desai while studying a topo map. Field work by Gordon MacLeod and others supports Desai's conclusion, but this is in conflict with numerous official county documents that list nearby Rose Peak as the highest point.

== See also ==
- List of highest points in California by county
