= Census county division =

U.S. statistical division of unincorporated areas of counties

A Census County Division (CCD) is a subdivision of a county used by the United States Census Bureau for the purpose of presenting statistical data. A CCD is a relatively permanent statistical area delineated cooperatively by the Census Bureau and state and local government authorities. CCDs are defined in 20 states that do not have well-defined and stable minor civil divisions (MCDs), such as townships, with local governmental purposes, or where the MCDs are deemed to be "unsatisfactory for the collection, presentation, and analysis of census statistics".

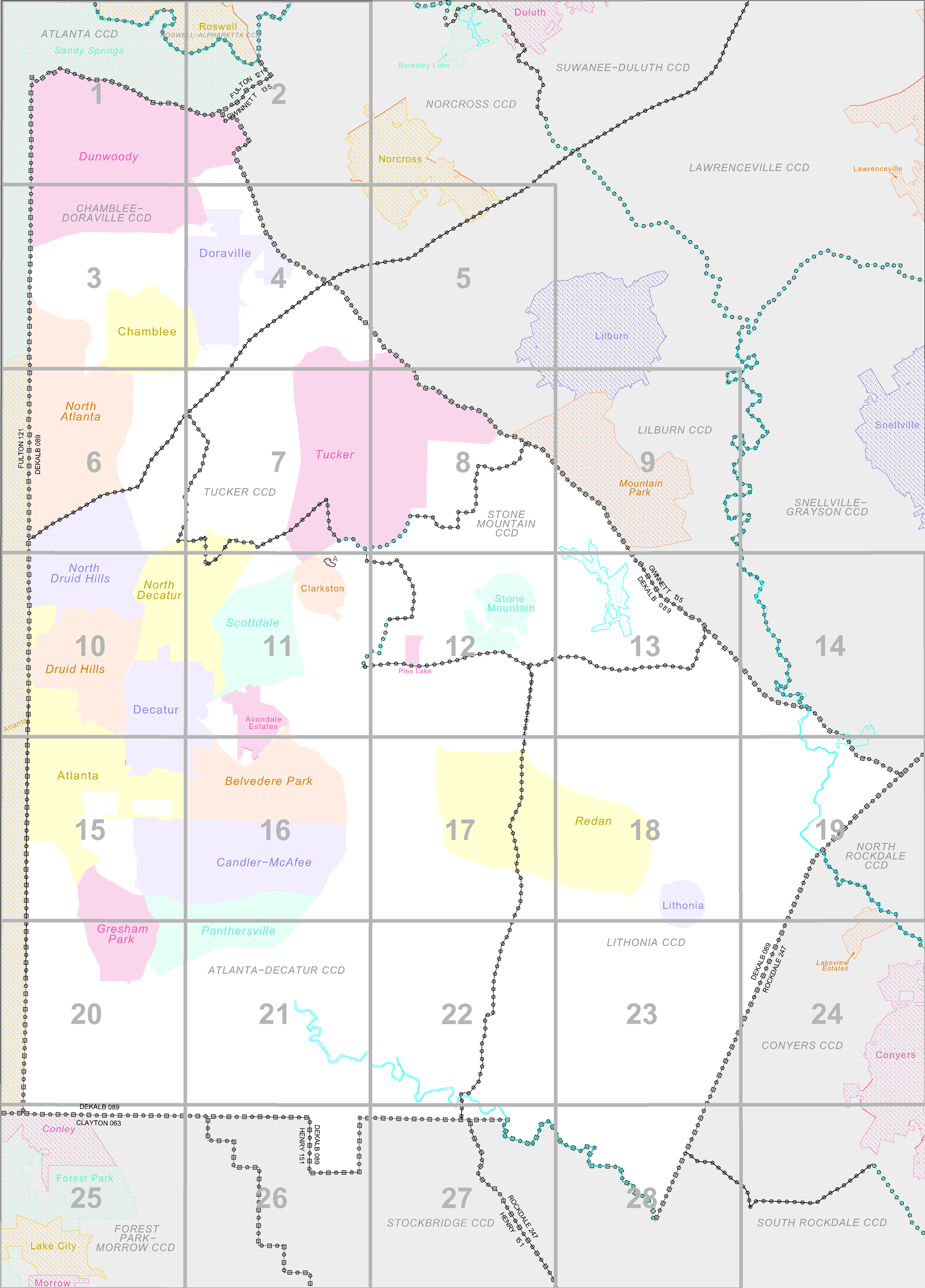
Census 2000 Block Map of DeKalb County, Georgia, showing the county's five CCDs (delineated by the dark lines).

CCDs are non-governmental units and have no legal or governmental functions. Their boundaries usually follow visible features, such as roads, railroads, streams, power transmission lines, or mountain ridges, and coincide with the boundaries of census tracts. CCDs do not span county lines. Each CCD is given a name based on the name of the largest population center in the area, a prominent geographic feature, the county name, or another well-known local name that identifies its location.

CCDs were first implemented for tabulation of 1950 census data from the state of Washington. As of the 2020 census, a total of 5,198 CCDs were defined in 20 states.

State	Number of CCDs (2020)
Alabama	390
Arizona	80
California	404
Colorado	209
Delaware	27
Florida	316
Georgia	586
Hawaii	44
Idaho	170
Kentucky	493
Montana	194
Nevada	71
New Mexico	130
Oklahoma	305
Oregon	212
South Carolina	299
Texas	862
Utah	93
Washington	242
Wyoming	71

North Dakota briefly adopted CCDs for the 1970 census, but soon returned to using MCDs for subsequent censuses. The main reason for abandoning CCDs was financial. As legal units of local government, MCDs could qualify for federal revenue sharing funds, while purely statistical areas like CCDs did not.

In 2008, Tennessee changed from using CCDs to using MCDs, leaving 20 states using CCDs as of the 2010 census.

== See also ==
- Census-designated place
