= Uvas Creek =

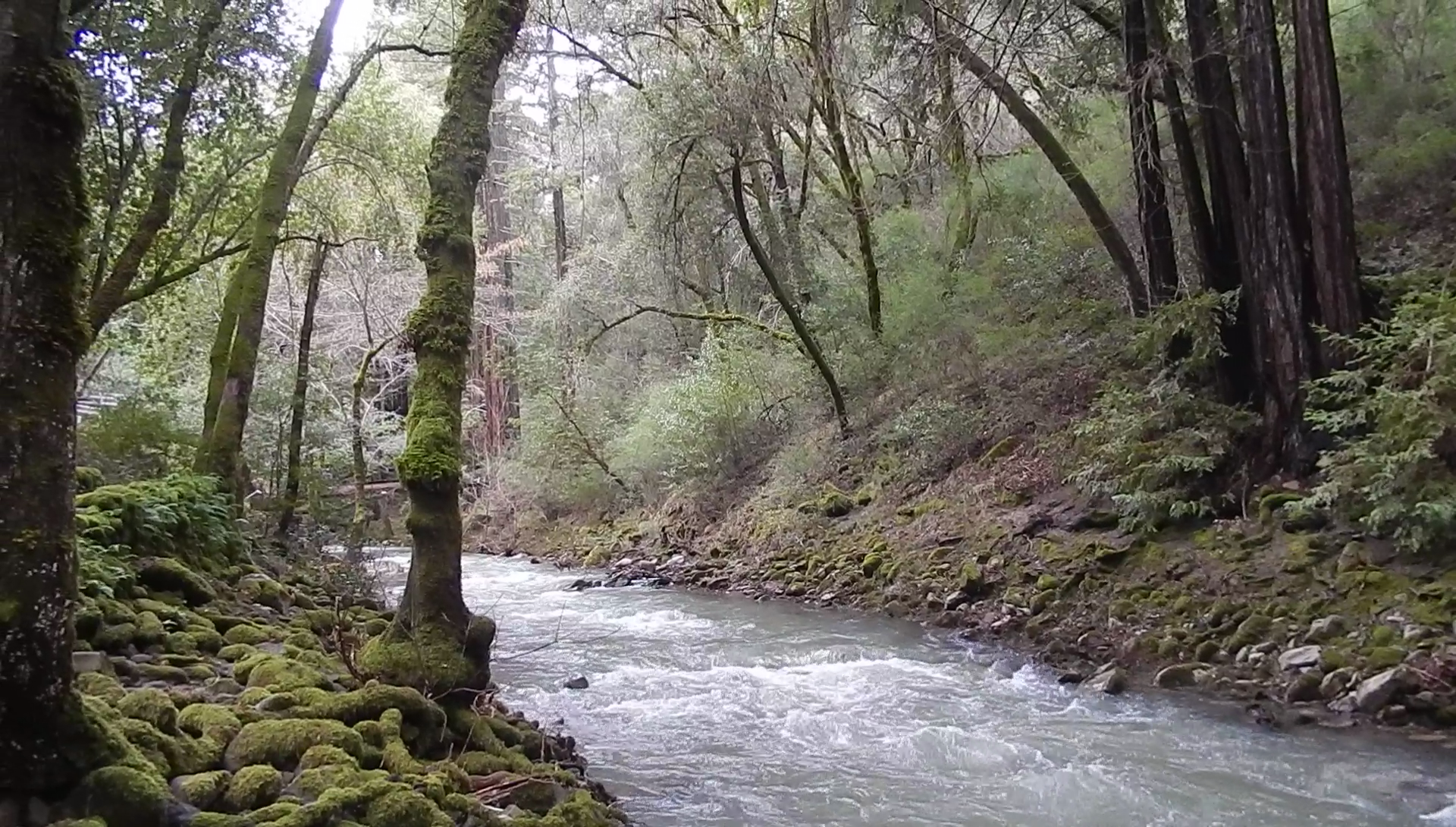
- Uvas Creek near Sveadal, California, January 2017

Location
- Country: United States
- State: California
- Region: Santa Clara County
- City: Gilroy, California

Physical characteristics
- Source: On the eastern flank of Loma Prieta Peak in the Santa Cruz Mountains
  - coordinates: 37°06′42″N 121°50′20″W
  - elevation: 3,250 ft (990 m)
- Mouth: Confluence with Pajaro River just after becoming Carnadero Creek
  - coordinates: 36°58′19″N 121°32′48″W
  - elevation: 167 ft (51 m)
- Length: 29.5 mi (47.5 km)

Basin features
- Tributaries
  - left: Little Uvas Creek, Hay Canyon, Sycamore Creek, Burchell Creek
  - right: Swanson Creek, Alec Creek, Croy Creek, Eastman Canyon Creek, Solis Creek, Little Arthur Creek, Bodfish Creek, Ousley Canyon Creek, Gavilan Creek, Tick Creek, Tar Creek

Uvas Creek is a 29.5-mile-long (47.5 km) mainly southward-flowing stream originating on Loma Prieta peak of the Santa Cruz Mountains, in Santa Clara County, California, United States. The creek descends through Uvas Canyon County Park into Uvas Reservoir near Morgan Hill, and on through Uvas Creek Preserve and Christmas Hill Park in Gilroy. Upon passing U.S. Highway 101 it is known as Carnadero Creek (also known as lower Uvas Creek), shortly before the confluence with the Pajaro River at the Santa Clara County - San Benito County boundary.

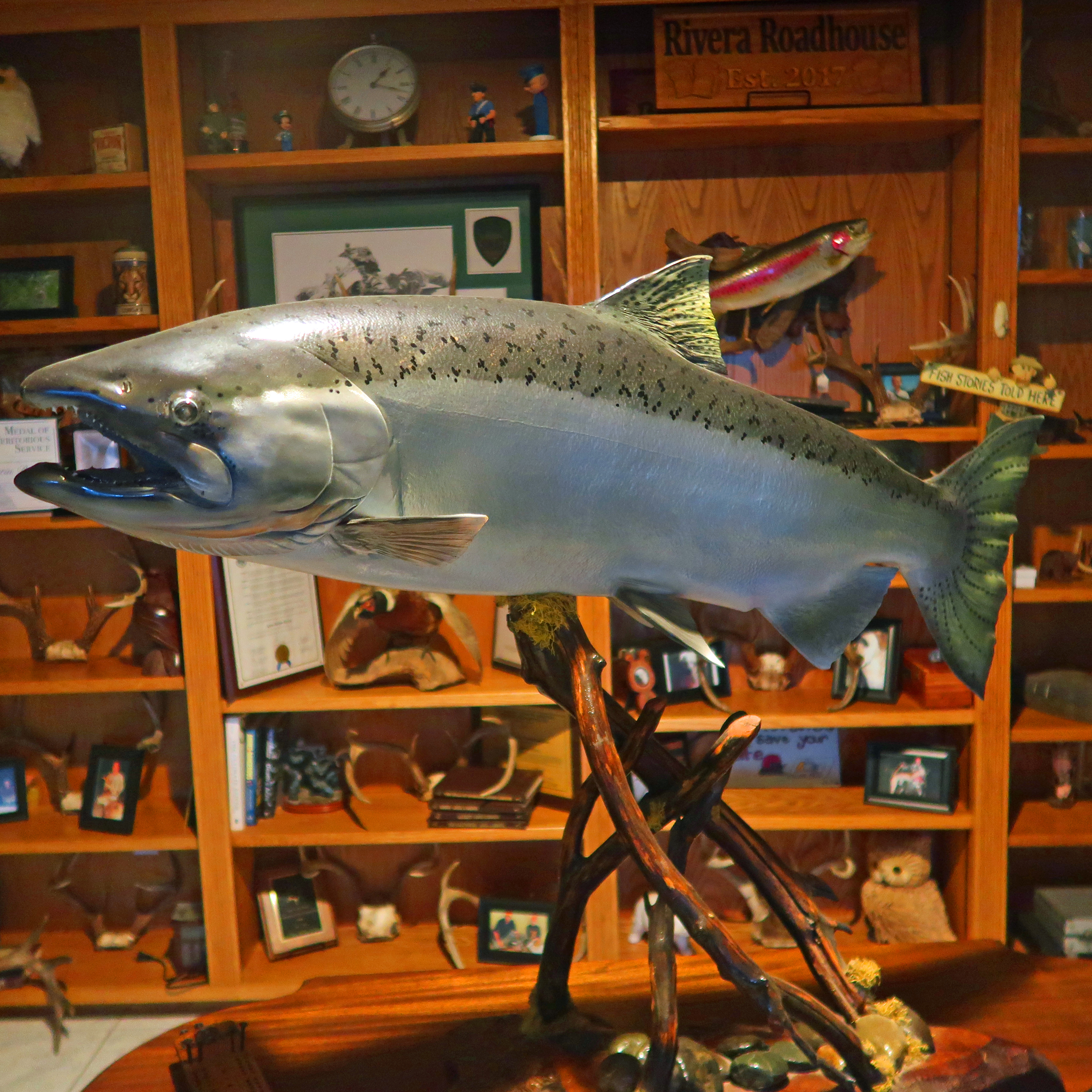
Last Chinook salmon caught in the Pajaro River watershed, at Uvas Creek near the intersection of Burchell and Watsonville Roads, west of Gilroy, California. The 40 lb. salmon was landed by Herman Garcia Sr. in 1953.

== History ==
Uvas Creek got its name from the 1842 Rancho Las Uvas Mexican land grant. The Spanish name for grapes, "uvas", is preserved in a number of place names, all apparently referring to the abundance of wild grapes (Vitis californica) along the area's main watercourses. "Carnadero" probably means "butchering place".

== Watershed and Course ==
The Uvas Creek watershed drains the eastern slope of the Santa Cruz Mountains in southern Santa Clara County. On the upper section of the creek is Uvas Canyon County Park. Here, portions of the Sargent Fault run alongside the creek down through Sveadal. Uvas Reservoir, built in 1957, drains 32 square miles (83 km^{2}) and is 7.5 miles (12.1 km) upstream of the City of Gilroy and 10.5 miles (16.9 km) upstream of the Pajaro River confluence. Significant tributaries include Croy Creek, Little Uvas Creek, Little Arthur Creek, Bodfish Creek and Gavilan Creek. Below Uvas Reservoir the creek is very low gradient. After Uvas Creek crosses Highway 101 and becomes Carnadero Creek (aka lower Uvas Creek) it is joined from the right by Gavilan Creek, Tick Creek and then Tar Creek. Uvas Creek is the only stream in the Pajaro River watershed, and in Santa Clara County, whose water right specifies minimum winter and summer releases for maintaining fish resources.

== Ecology ==
Uvas Creek supports a self-sustaining population of steelhead that is part of the Southern Central California Coast Distinct population segment (DPS), which is listed as "threatened" under the Endangered Species Act. The year before Uvas Creek Dam was constructed in 1957, the Santa Clara Valley Water District (SCVWD) agreed with the California Department of Fish and Game (CDFG) in a Memorandum of Agreement (MOU) to maintain flows sufficient to protect steelhead trout (coastal rainbow trout) (Oncorhynchus mykiss irideus) populations below Uvas Reservoir and to collect and truck returning adults above the dam to spawn upstream, however this latter promise was not kept.

A non-profit volunteer organization called CHEER (Coastal Habitat Education and Environmental Restoration) founded by Herman Garcia, transports steelhead stranded in drying pools to reaches of Uvas Creek that are perennial. In 2008, Garcia's organization transported more than 23,000 steelhead, a dramatic number compared to the 100-200 fish reported in the entire Pajaro River system in 1991. Two tributaries of Uvas Creek are also steelhead spawning and rearing streams, Bodfish and Little Arthur Creeks. Herman's father, Herman Garcia Sr., caught the last known Chinook salmon in the Pajaro River watershed, in Uvas Creek in 1953. Although the image shows no adipose fin, California's hatcheries were not clipping adipose fins until the 1970s, so it may be an artifact of the taxidermy.

The northwest to southeast orientation of Uvas Reservoir is in line with prevailing winds which drive the warm surface layer (epilimnion) down into the cool bottom layer (hypolimnion), so that by late summer the bottom water is warm and anoxic. The result is that no wild or planted trout survive the summer in the reservoir. Wild populations of native stream resident coastal rainbow trout persist Uvas Dam. Genetic studies of these fish in upper Uvas Creek above Uvas Road show that they are of native, and not hatchery stock.

Other native fish species in the Uvas Creek watershed include Sacramento sucker (Catostomus occidentalis), Sacramento pikeminnow (Ptychocheilus grandis), California roach (Lavinia symmetricus), Riffle sculpin (Cottus gulosus), Pacific lamprey (Lampetra tridentata), and Threespine stickleback (Gasterosteus aculeatus). Prickly sculpin (Cottus asper) and Hitch (Lavinia exilicauda) are also present, but are relatively scarce. Non-native fish are uncommon in Uvas Creek.

== See also ==
- Riparian zone
- List of watercourses in the San Francisco Bay Area
