= Uvas Reservoir =

Reservoir in Morgan Hill, California

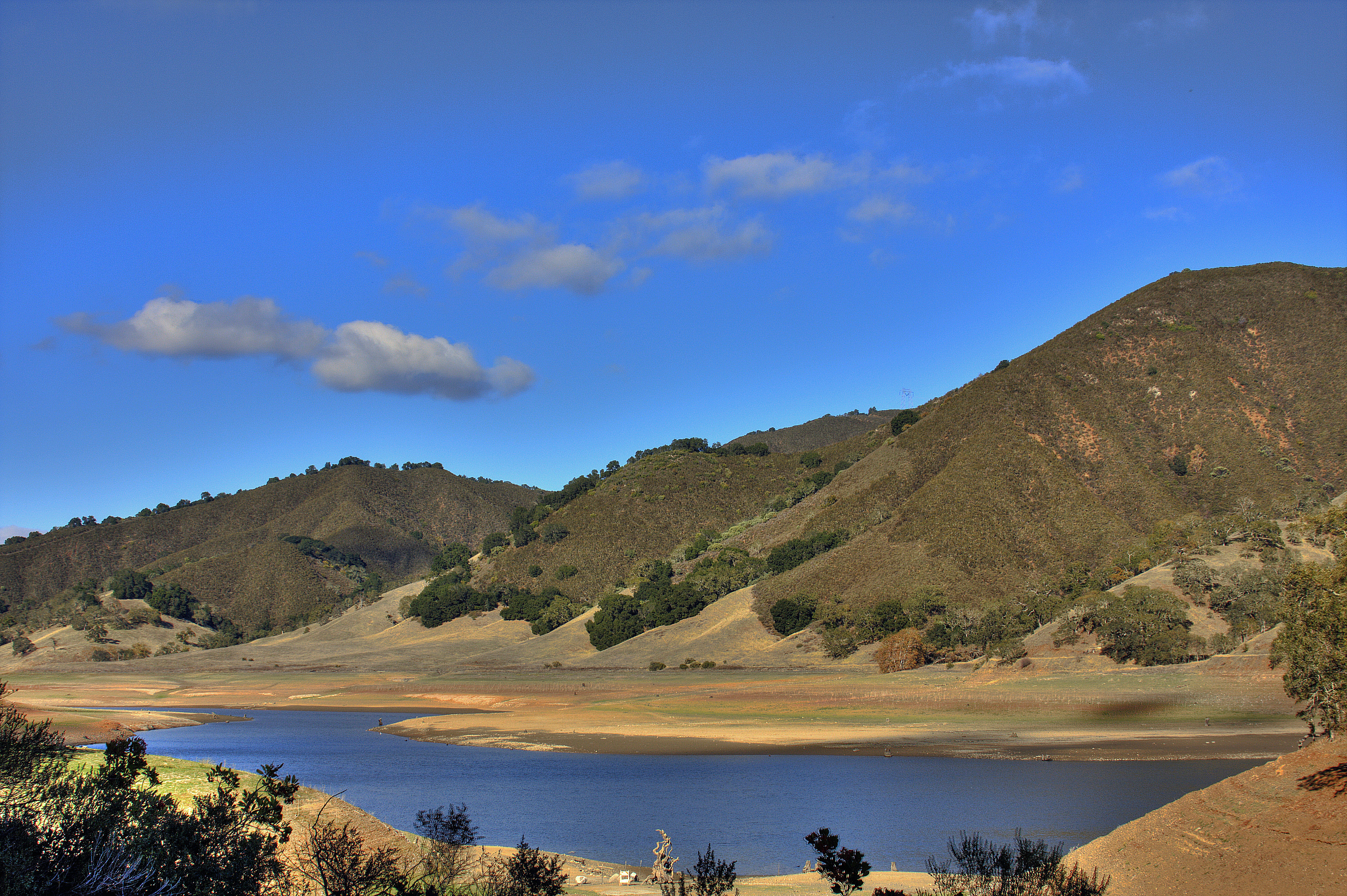
- November 2000

- Location within California Location within the United States
- Location: 14200 Uvas Rd, Morgan Hill, CA 95037
- Coordinates: 37°03′57″N 121°41′26″W
- Type: reservoir
- Primary inflows: Uvas Creek
- Primary outflows: Uvas Creek
- Catchment area: 345 sq mi (894 km^{2})
- Basin countries: United States
- Managing agency: Santa Clara Valley Water District
- Surface area: 288 acres (1.17 km^{2})
- Water volume: 10,000 acre⋅ft (0.012 km^{3})
- Surface elevation: 440 ft (134 m)

Uvas Reservoir is an artificial lake located west of Morgan Hill, California, in the United States. The reservoir is surrounded by a 626-acre (253 ha) park managed by the Santa Clara County Parks and Recreation Department. The park provides limited fishing ("catch-and-release"), picnicking, and hiking activities. Boating is not permitted in the reservoir.

== Geography ==
The reservoir sits atop part of the Franciscan Formation. A variety of rocks from the formation can be found there, including slate, basalt, marble, and many others.

== History ==
The reservoir was created in 1957 (69 years ago) by the construction of the Uvas Dam across Uvas Creek in the southern part of Uvas Valley. It is the fifth largest reservoir owned by the Santa Clara Valley Water District.

In 2013, the Scoffone family sold 357 acres (144 ha) adjacent to the park to the Peninsula Open Space Trust, which doubled the park's size.

== See also ==
- List of lakes in California
- List of lakes in the San Francisco Bay Area
- List of reservoirs and dams in California
