= Llagas-Uvas, California =

Unincorporated community in California, United States

Llagas-Uvas
- census county division (CCD)
- Location in the United States
- Coordinates: 37°0′30″N 121°42′26″W
- Country: United States
- State: California
- County: Santa Clara

Area
  - Total: 102.176 sq mi (264.634 km^{2})
  - Land: 101.371 sq mi (262.550 km^{2})
  - Water: 0.805 sq mi (2.084 km^{2}) 0.79%
- Elevation: 1,198 ft (365 m)

Population (2010)
  - Total: 4,014
  - Density: 39.60/sq mi (15.29/km^{2})
- Time zone: UTC-8 (PST)
  - Summer (DST): UTC-7 (PDT)
- ZIP code(s): 95046, 95037, 95020
- Area codes: 408, 669
- FIPS code: 06-08591680
- GNIS feature ID: 1935173

Llagas-Uvas is an unincorporated census county division (CCD) located on the eastern side of the Santa Cruz Mountains in southwest Santa Clara County, California, United States. The area covers approximately 102 square miles (260 km^{2}), much of it open space, and contains the Uvas and Chesbro reservoirs, as well as the Calero, Uvas Canyon, Rancho Cañada del Oro, and Mount Madonna county parks.

As a result of the favorable Mediterranean climate, there are many wineries in the area, including Dorcich Family Vineyards, Sycamore Creek, Martin Ranch, Hecker Pass, Fernwood Cellars, Fortino, Kirigin Cellars, Solis, and Sarah's Vineyard. There are also several equestrian centers in the area, including Calero Ranch Stables, Cevalo Riding Academy, Five Star Farms, Great Strides, Hidden Creek, Legacy Oaks, and Bodfish Creek Ranch.

As of the 2010 US Census, the population was 4,014 residents of whom 67.1% were non-Hispanic white, 20.1% Hispanic, 8.5% Asian, and 4.3% of other races, with a median age of 45.5 years old. As of 2009, the median income was $104,378 and median home price $991,773.

Apart from the communities of Sveadal and Loma Chiquita, most residents and businesses in the area use postal zip codes from neighboring cities of Morgan Hill, San Martin, or Gilroy. The telephone area codes are 408 and 669.

== History ==
In Spanish, the word "uva" means "grape" and "llaga" means "wound".

The region was well known to Indian and European settlers for its abundance of wild grapes. The Uvas Creek was named after the land grant Cañada de las Uvas ("grape ravine"). This creek feeds into the Uvas Reservoir.

During the 19th century, Mexican land grants for Rancho Las Uvas, Rancho Ojo del Agua de la Coche, Rancho Solis and Rancho San Francisco de las Llagas were allocated in the area. Rancho San Francisco de las Llagas in the northern part was named after Las Llagas de Nuestro Padre San Francisco ("the wounds of Our Father Saint Francis"). The main creek that runs through the ranch was named Llagas Creek.

In 1955, the Chesbro reservoir was formed by damming the Llagas creek, to ensure adequate water supply for the surrounding farms and growing population of nearby Morgan Hill.
