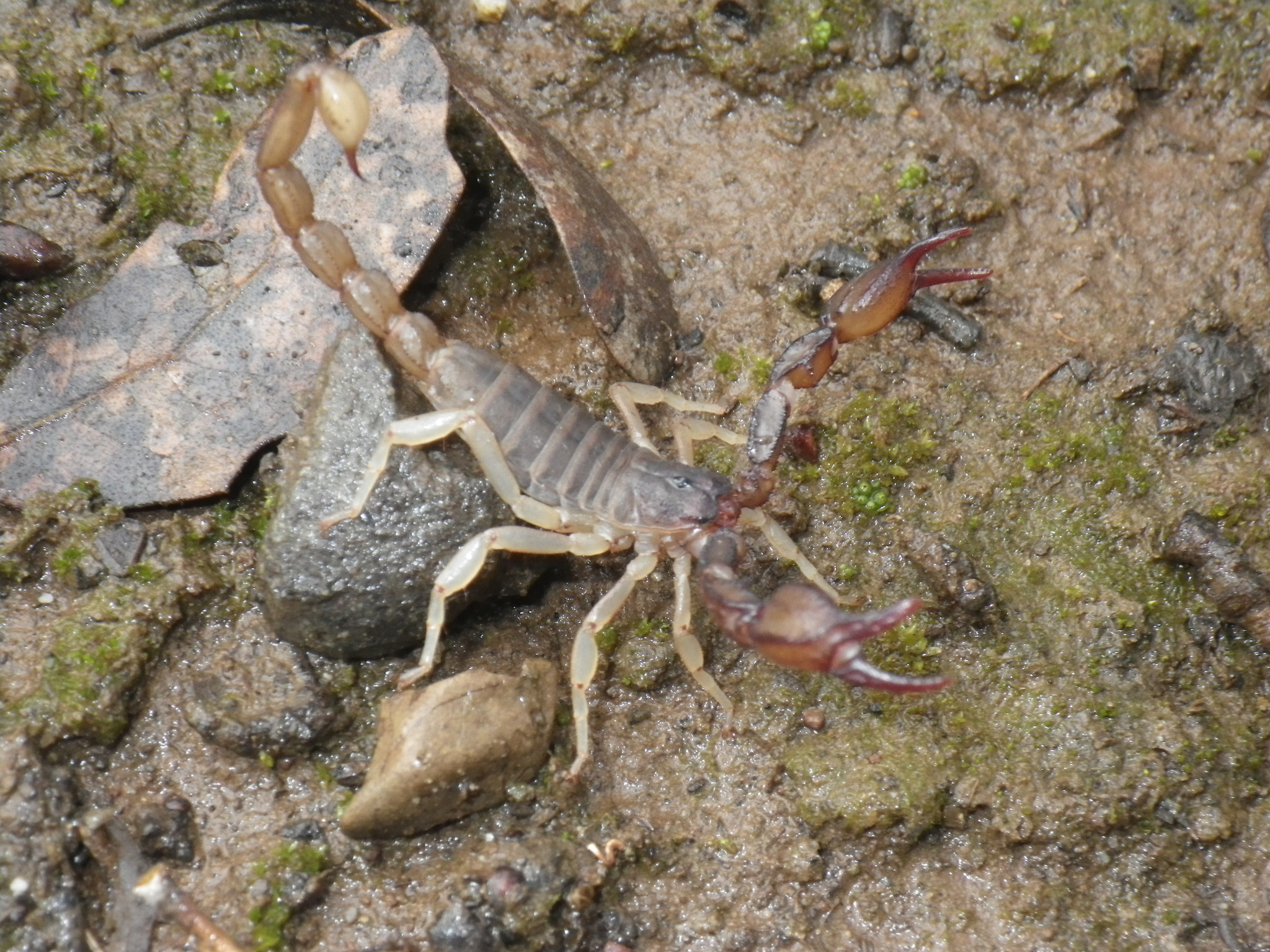
- Uroctonus mordax

Scientific classification
- Domain: Eukaryota
- Kingdom: Animalia
- Phylum: Arthropoda
- Subphylum: Chelicerata
- Class: Arachnida
- Order: Scorpiones
- Family: Chactidae
- Genus: Uroctonus; Thorell, 1876

= Uroctonus =

Genus of scorpions

Uroctonus is a genus of forest scorpions in the family Vaejovidae. There are at least four described species in Uroctonus.

== Species ==
These four species belong to the genus Uroctonus:

- Uroctonus franckei Williams, 1986
- Uroctonus grahami Gertsch & Soleglad, 1972
- Uroctonus mordax Thorell, 1876 (California forest scorpion)
- Uroctonus privus Karsch, 1879
