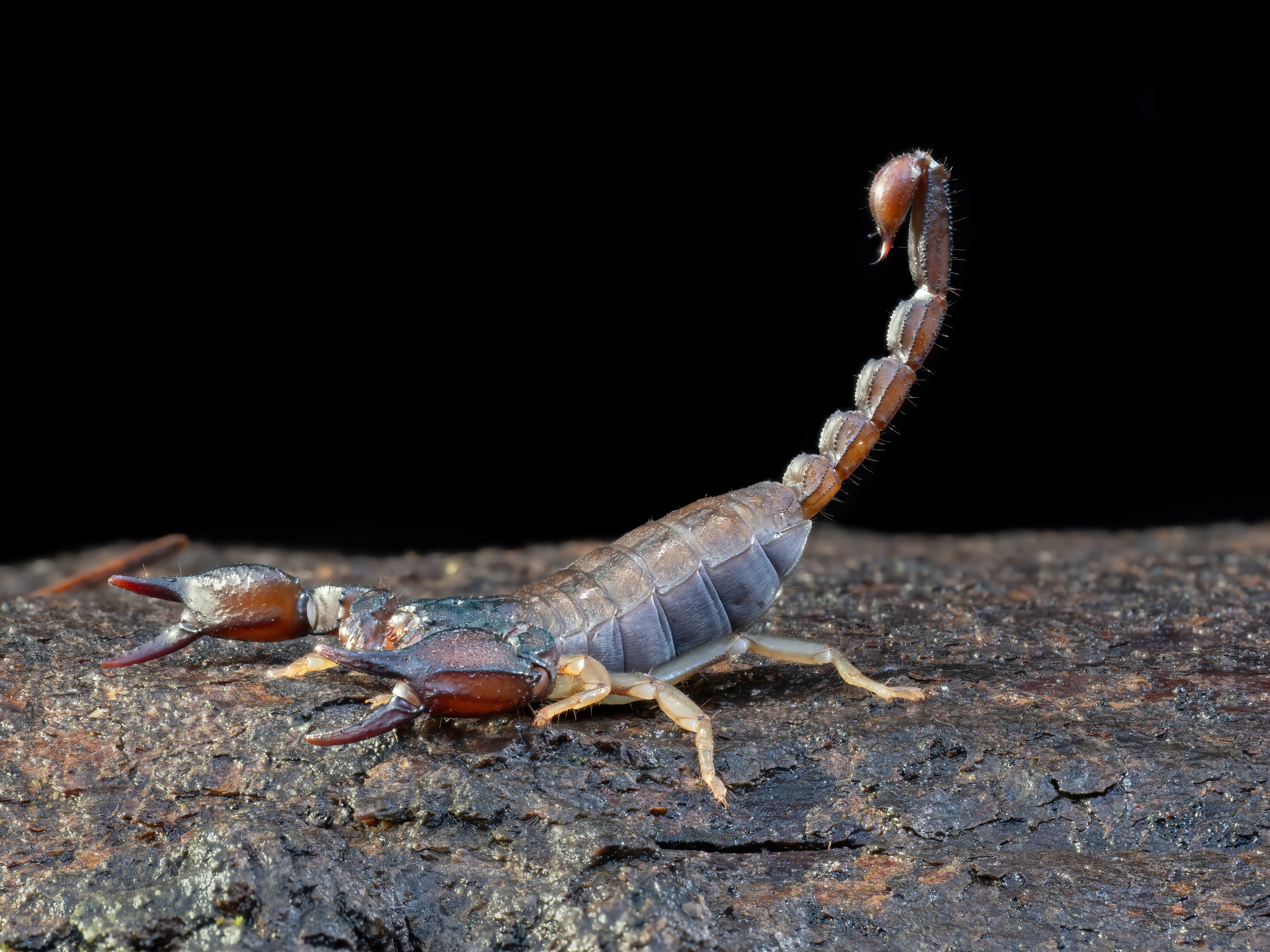

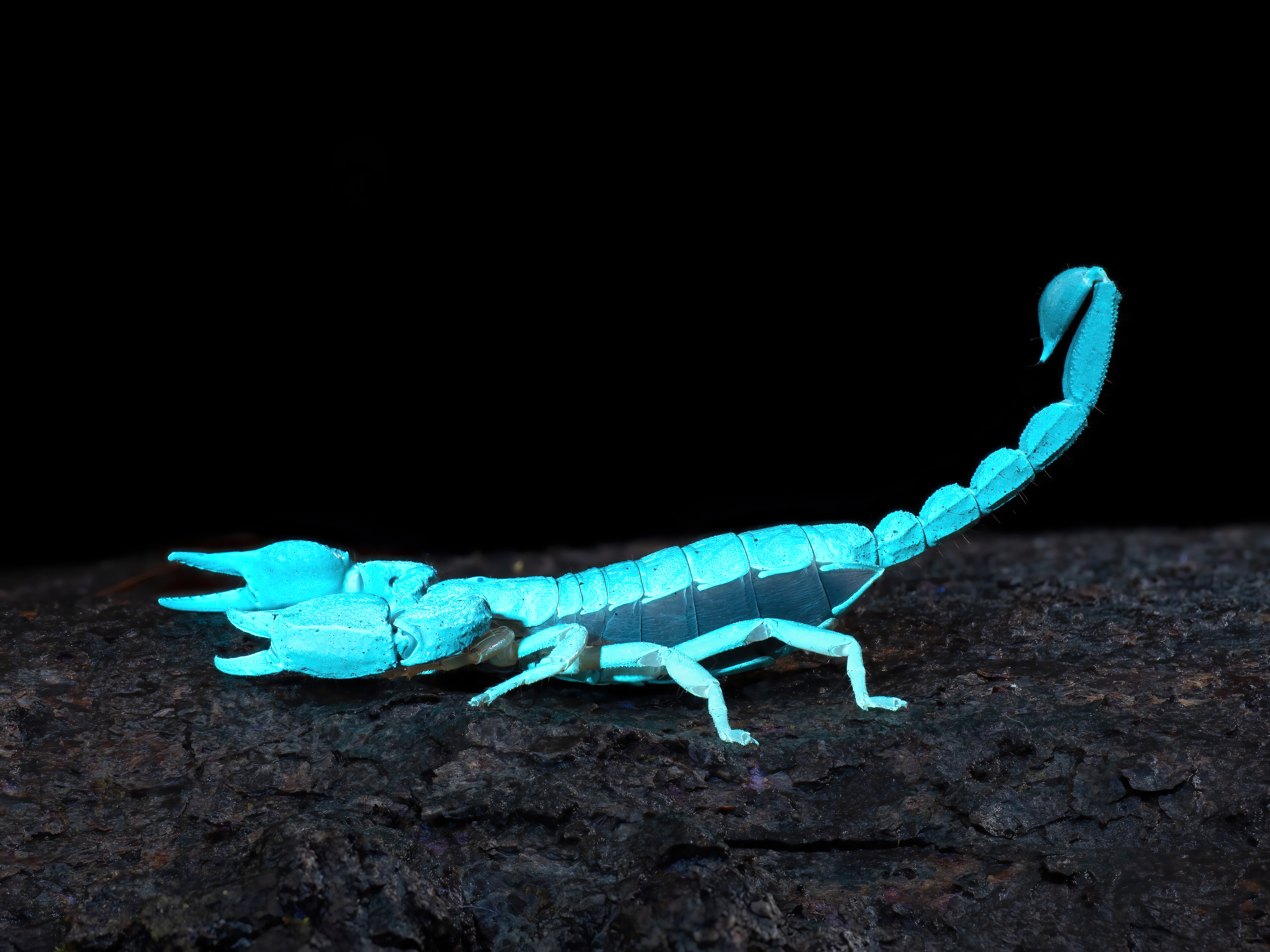

Scientific classification
- Kingdom: Animalia
- Phylum: Arthropoda
- Subphylum: Chelicerata
- Class: Arachnida
- Order: Scorpiones
- Family: Chactidae
- Genus: Uroctonus
- Species: U. mordax

Binomial name
- Uroctonus mordax Thorell, 1876

= Uroctonus mordax =

Species of scorpion

Uroctonus mordax, known generally as the California forest scorpion or western forest scorpion, is a species of scorpion in the family Vaejovidae. Most notably, this species is almost entirely restricted to California's Redwood Forests and Oak Woodlands, and is considered a foundational species in those ecosystems. They are most often found on south or west-facing slopes, under rocks or logs on the ground, and prefer a moist environment.

== Anatomy ==
Western forest scorpions have eight legs and two large claws in front of their mouths. Their bodies are more "squat" with skinnier tails than other scorpion species. Western forest scorpions are typically dark brown or black. Their legs are a translucent yellowish-brown. Males have a duller color than females. Males are also smaller and shorter in length. Fifth metasomal segment has a ventral median carina which forks to form a "Y".

They have been described as "smaller than your pinkie, has a sting milder than a honeybee's, is so shy it only hunts on moonless nights and even then is most often seen running away"

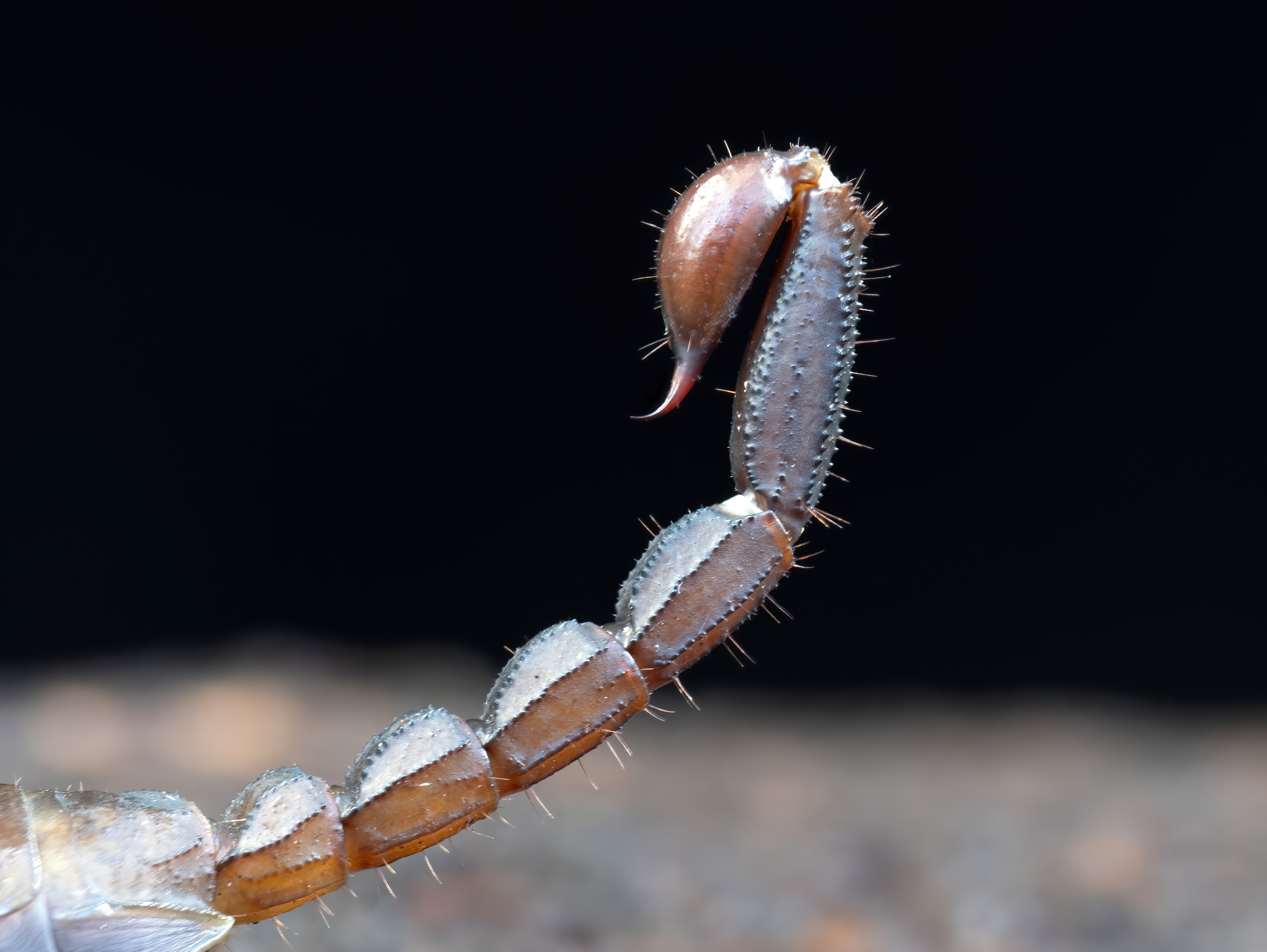
Uroctonus mordax stinger

== Habitat ==
The western forest scorpion is most common in the San Francisco Bay Area, but it is also found in western Oregon and as far north as southern Washington. They reside often in remote regions of the western facing hills. Their habitat ranges from elevations of 5 meters up to 2000 meters. California forest scorpions require a moister environment than other species of scorpions; therefore, they primarily reside under rocks, bark, and dead trees.

== Behavior ==
=== Birthing ===
Uroctonus mordax deliver their young at an earlier stage in their development. Studies have shown the western forest scorpion to give birth primarily in the summer months. The young are engulfed in a membrane at birth that is held by the mother until they can escape. After leaving the membrane, they climb to the mother's back. However, at no point do the young's legs touch the ground in the process of getting to the back.

== Subspecies ==
These two subspecies belong to the species Uroctonus mordax:

- Uroctonus mordax canaliculatus Karsch, 1879
- Uroctonus mordax mordax
