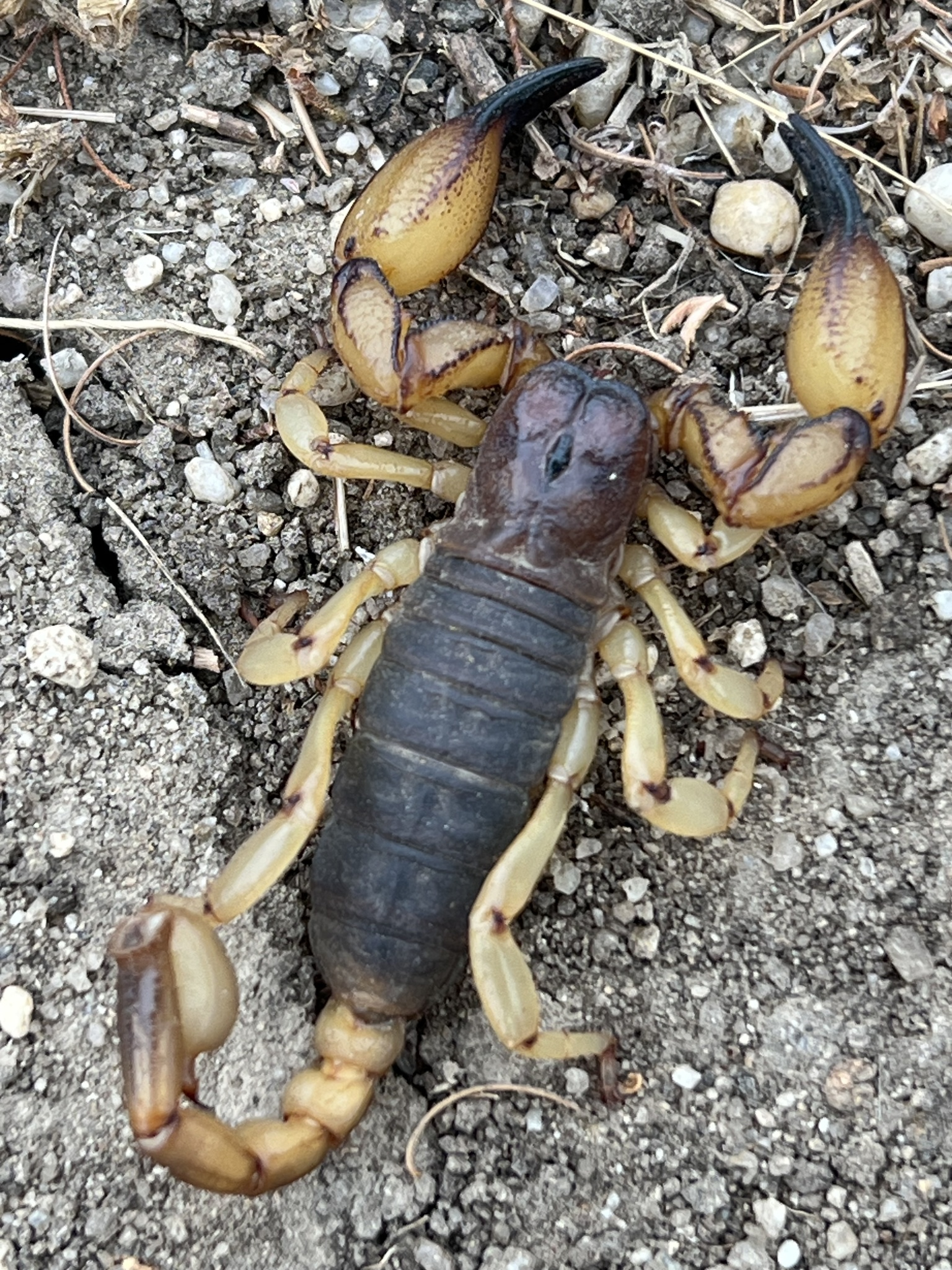
- San Onofre State Beach, San Diego County, 2023

Scientific classification
- Domain: Eukaryota
- Kingdom: Animalia
- Phylum: Arthropoda
- Subphylum: Chelicerata
- Class: Arachnida
- Order: Scorpiones
- Family: Chactidae
- Genus: Anuroctonus
- Species: A. pococki

Binomial name
- Anuroctonus pococki Soleglad & Fet, 2004

= Anuroctonus pococki =

North American scorpion

Anuroctonus pococki, also known as the California swollen-stinger scorpion, is a species of scorpion of the family Chactidae. It is native to the coast ranges of Southern California, and into Baja California in North America. This is the only scorpion from the genus Anuroctonus in Baja California. This scorpion, at 65 mm (2.6 in), is large compared to other scorpions found in the region.

These scorpions have very large, black-tipped claws, and a "swollen region just before the stinger" on their telsons, most prominent in mature males. California swollen-stinger scorpions are nocturnal ambush predators who mostly wait in their burrows for bypassing prey species. Females dig burrows up to 60 cm (24 in) deep, while burrows created by males are usually 15–20 cm (5.9–7.9 in) underground.

This scorpion was first formally named in 2004.

Stings from the mildly venomous California swollenstinger scorpion are rare. They are usually painful but non-serious and resolve after 24 hours; however, in some cases stings may pose serious health problems in the very young or old, and professional medical attention is recommended for anyone stung by a scorpion.

== Taxonomy ==
Anuroctonus pococki contains the following subspecies:

- Anuroctonus pococki pococki
- Anuroctonus pococki bajae

== See also ==
- Arizona bark scorpion
