= Sveadal, California =

Sveadal
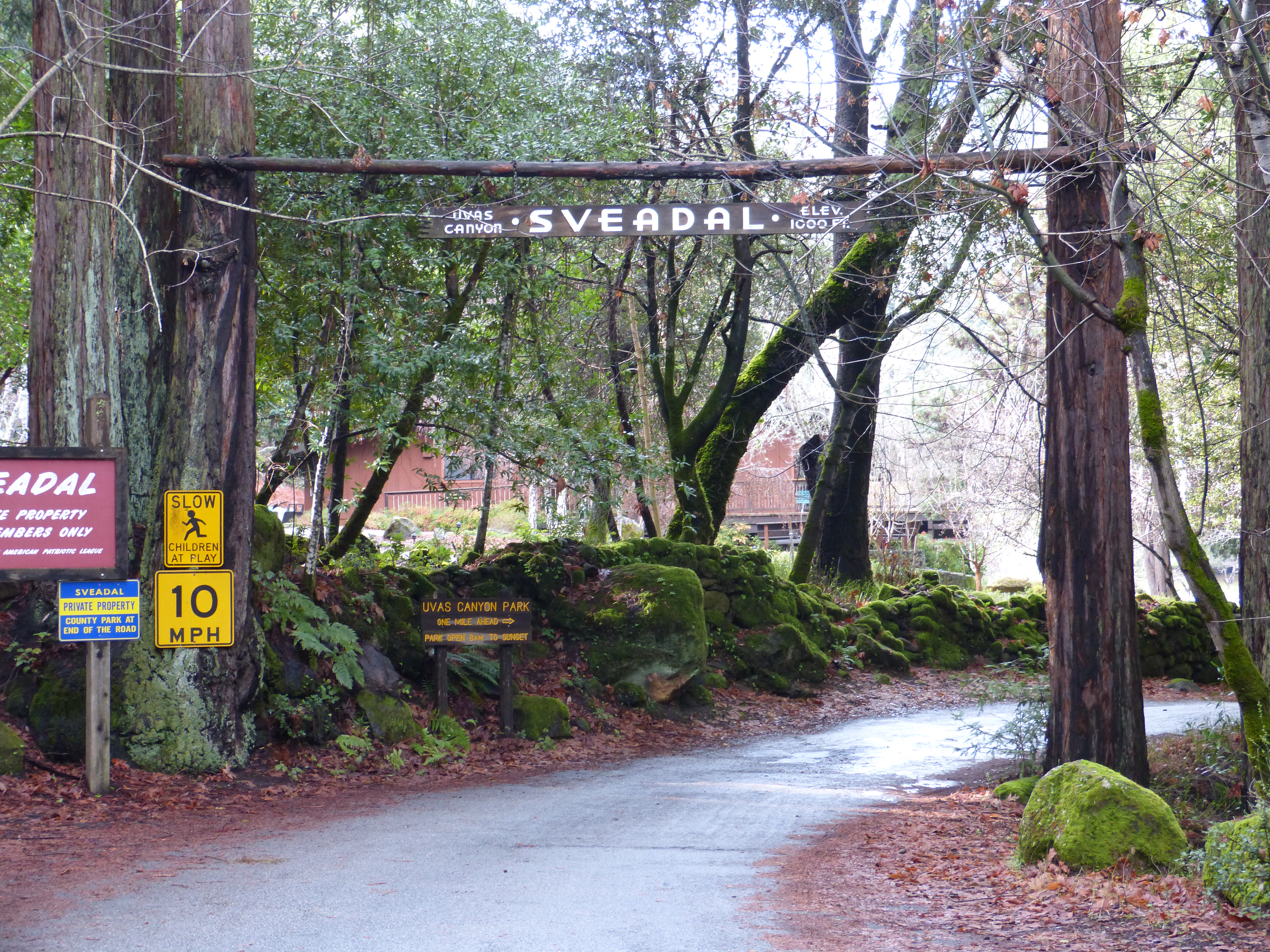
- Entrance to Sveadal (2016)

- Location in the United States
- Coordinates: 37°05′01″N 121°47′21″W
- Country: United States
- State: California
- County: Santa Clara

Area
  - Total: 0.169 sq mi (0.44 km^{2})
  - Land: 0.160 sq mi (0.41 km^{2})
  - Water: 0.009 sq mi (0.023 km^{2})
- Elevation: 1,030 ft (314 m)
- Time zone: UTC-8 (PST)
  - Summer (DST): UTC-7 (PDT)
- ZIP code: 95037
- Area codes: 408, 669
- GNIS feature ID: 1659932

Sveadal is a private summer resort in an unincorporated area of Llagas-Uvas in Santa Clara County, California, United States. The Swedish American cultural heritage and recreation center is situated west of Morgan Hill in the eastern Santa Cruz Mountains, adjacent to Uvas Canyon County Park. Since its founding in 1926, it has been owned and operated by the Swedish American Patriotic League, a congress of local organizations, dedicated to promoting and perpetuating common Swedish-American heritage in the San Francisco Bay Area. It has been visited by three generations of Swedish royalty, since 1927 when then Crown Prince (and later King) Gustav VI Adolf of Sweden and his wife dedicated Sveadal in 1927.

Access to Sveadal is via Croy Road, a two-lane paved secondary road off Uvas Road (County Route G8) with no outlet that narrows to a single lane within Sveadal. Visitors to Uvas Canyon County Park must pass through Sveadal. There are both private cabins and rental units for club members on site. The ZIP Code is 95037 and the community is inside area codes 408 and 669.

== Swedish Organizations ==
- Swedish American Patriotic League of San Francisco
- Vasa Order of America
- Swedish Club of San Francisco Bay Area
- Swedish Council of America
- Swedish American Chambers of Commerce of the USA
