= Uvas Canyon County Park =

Park in California

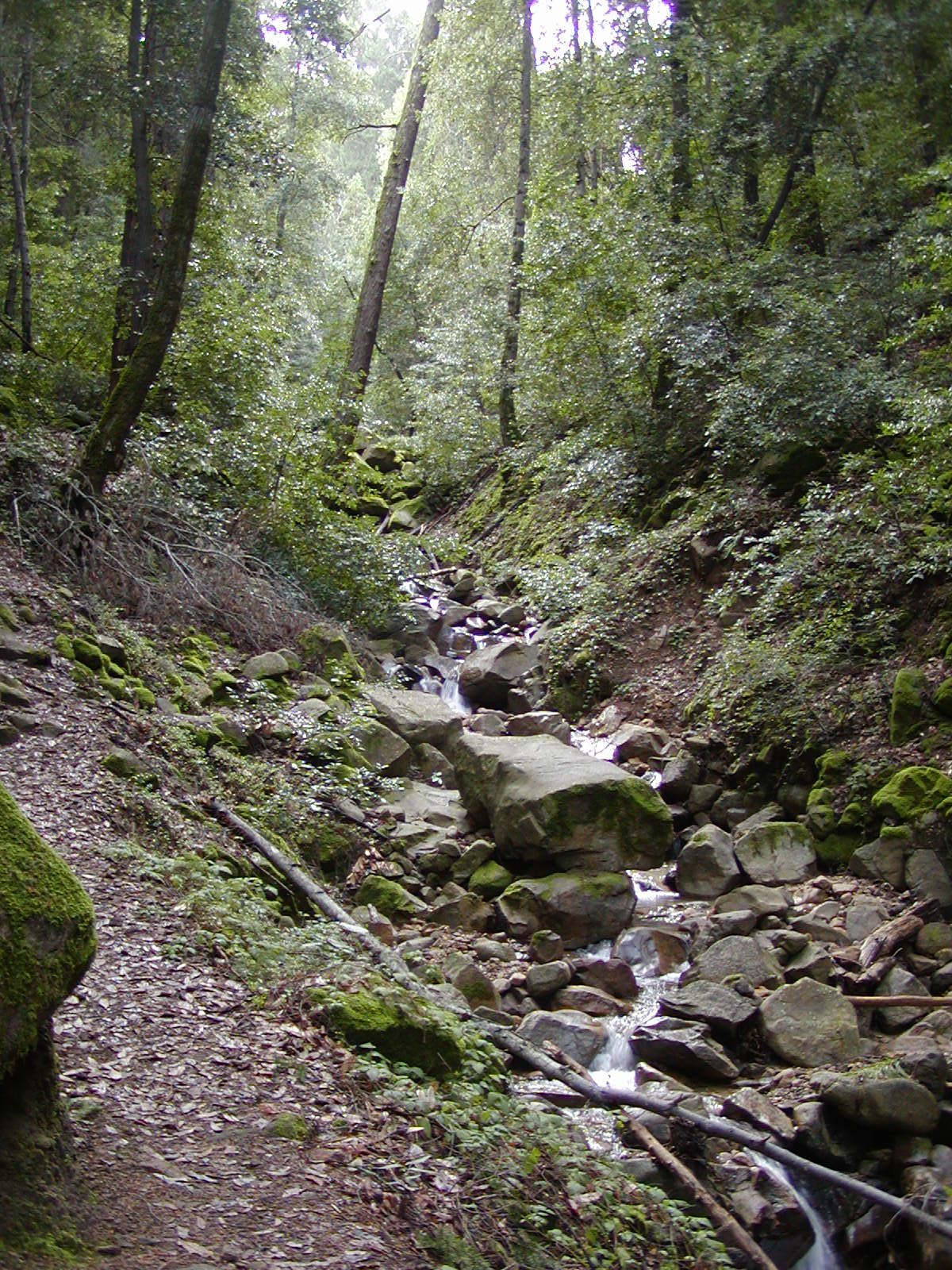
- Swanson Creek in Uvas Canyon
- Type: County park
- Location: 8515 Croy Rd Morgan Hill, CA 95037
- Area: 1.79 sq mi (4.6 km^{2})
- Operator: Santa Clara County Parks
- Status: Open daily

Uvas Canyon County Park is a 1,147-acre (464 ha) natural park located in upper Uvas Canyon on the eastern side of the Santa Cruz Mountains, west of Morgan Hill, California. The park has several small waterfalls, some of which flow perennially, that feed into tributaries confluent with Uvas Creek. The park is part of the Santa Clara County Parks System, and facilitates picnics, hiking and overnight camping. It is one of the few parks in the area that allows dogs in the campgrounds.

Access to Uvas Canyon County Park is via Croy Road, a two-lane paved secondary road off Uvas Road with no outlet that narrows to a single lane within the small private community of Sveadal, just before the park entrance.

The park is located at 8515 Croy Rd, Morgan Hill. Uvas Canyon has 7.2 miles of hiking trails that includes a 1 mile Waterfall Loop. There are picnic areas and campsites as well. At one time Uvas Canyon was the tribal territory of the Mutsun Ohlone Indians. Uva is the Spanish word for grape. Uvas Creek and Uvas Canyon were named for the wild grapes once abundant in the area.

== History ==
In 2017, a significant portion of the park's trail network as well as Croy Road were damaged by heavy rains. The park has now been reopened following extensive repairs.

Uvas Canyon County Park is 1147 acres. In 1961 the County Parks Department bought the first parcel of 425 acres of land for Uvas Canyon County Park from Mrs. Lois (Wallace-McPhee) Allen. This land has the park entrance, picnic grounds and campgrounds. Another 256 acres was purchased in 1961 and the park opened in 1962 for use of the camping facilities. Over 600 acres have been added to the park since 1961.

== Flora ==
A partial list of trees and plants found in the park is described in the park's Waterfall Loop Nature Trail Guide. Some are non-native species, brought in by early settlers.

- Bigleaf maple (Acer macrophyllum)
- California blackberry (Rubus ursinus)
- California buckeye (Aesculus californica)
- California juniper (Juniperus californica)
- California laurel (Umbellularia californica)
- California nutmeg (Torreya californica)
- California sagebrush (Artemisia californica)
- Canyon live oak (Quercus chrysolepis)
- Coast redwood (Sequoia sempervirens)
- Coastal wood fern (Dryopteris arguta)
- Coyote brush (Baccharis spp.)
- Douglas fir (Pseudotsuga menziesii)
- Golden back fern (Pentagramma triangularis)
- Madrone (Arbutus menziesii)
- Miner's lettuce (Claytonia perfoliata)
- Poison oak (Toxicodendron diversilobum)
- Sticky monkey flower (Diplacus aurantiacus)
- Western sword fern (Polystichum munitum)
- Tanbark oak (Notholithocarpus densiflorus)
- Thimbleberry (Rubus parviflorus)
- Tree of heaven (Ailanthus altissima)
- Western sycamore (Platanus racemosa)
- White alder (Alnus rhombifolia)
- Wood rose (Rosa gymnocarpa)
- Periwinkle (Vinca major)
- Trailing myrtle (Vinca minor)
Flora in Uvas Canyon County Park
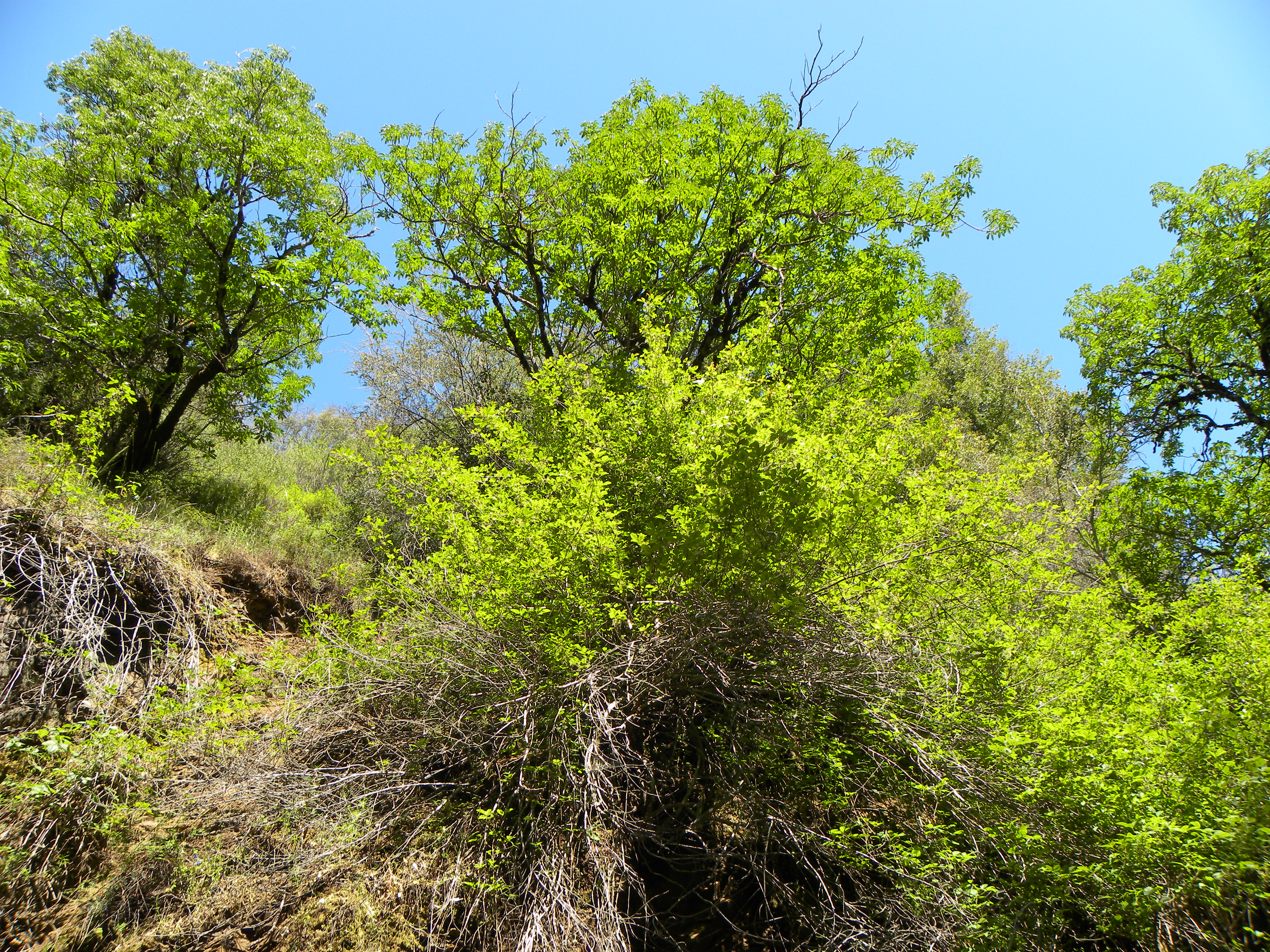
California buckeye tree in the park. The bark, leaves and fruits of the tree are poisonous to eat. However, its flowers provide nectar to butterflies.

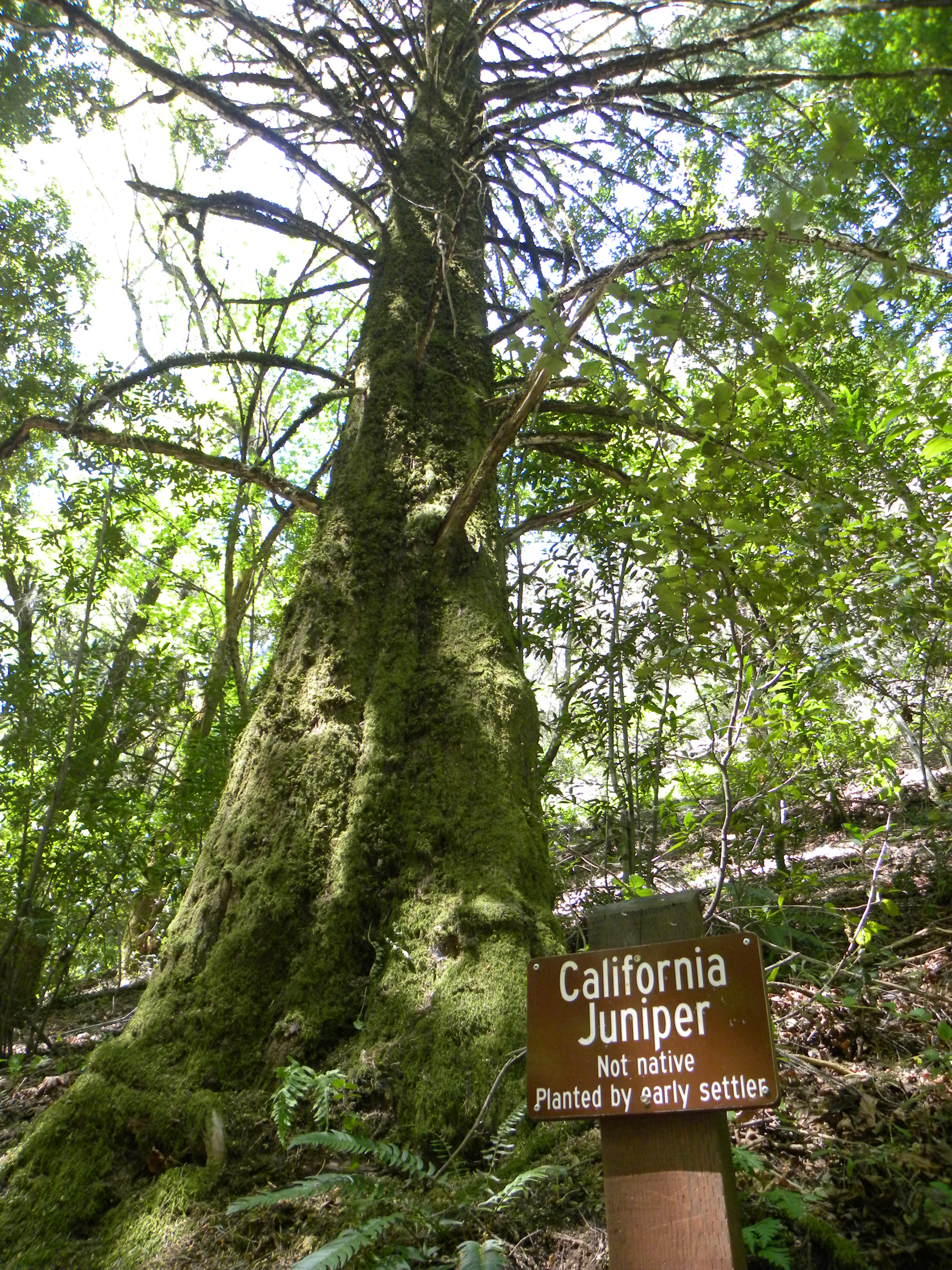
California juniper tree in the park. Although native to other parts of California, this one was brought in by early settlers.

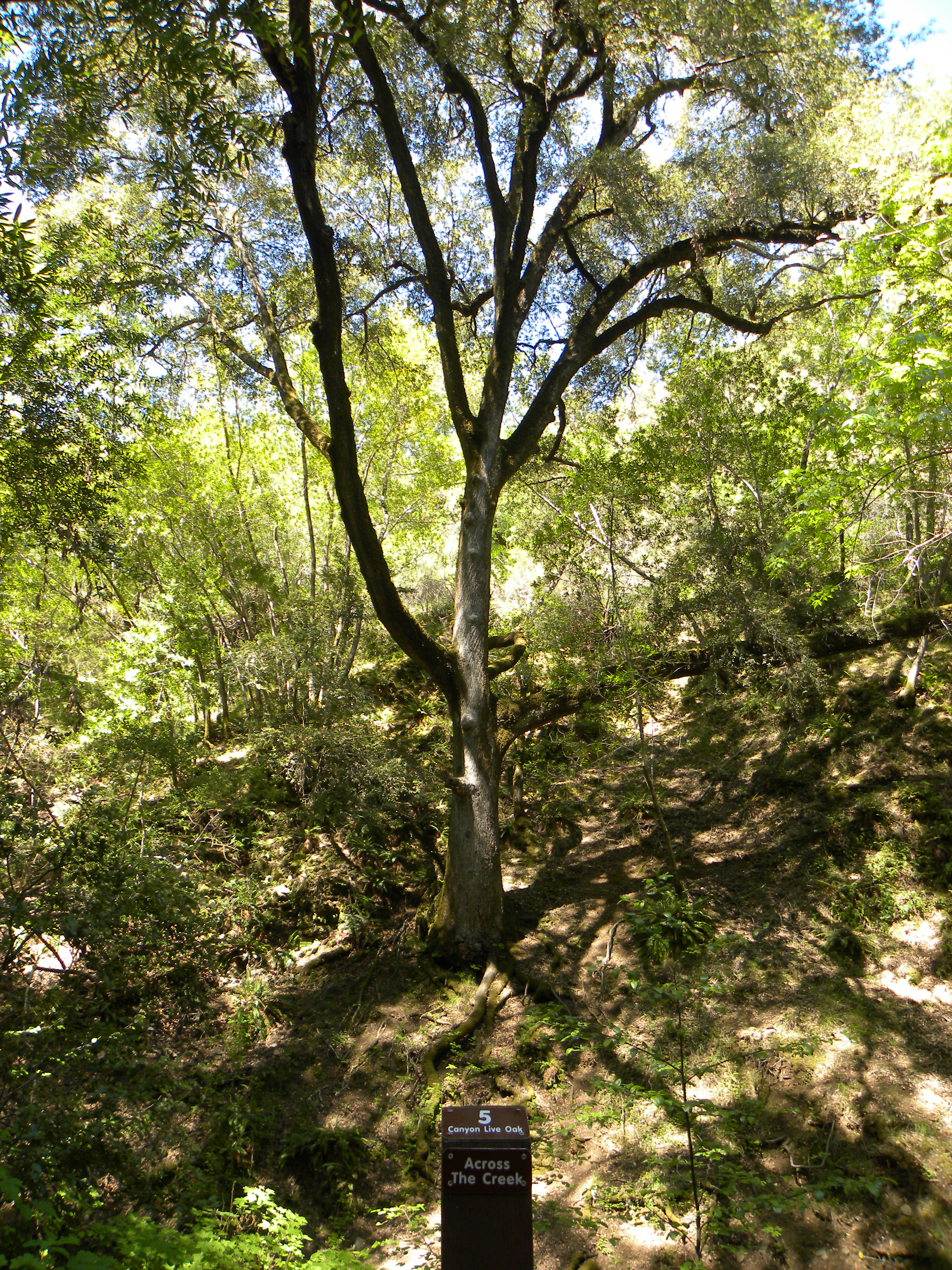
Canyon live oak tree in the park. A variety of fauna forage on the tree's acorns and foliage.

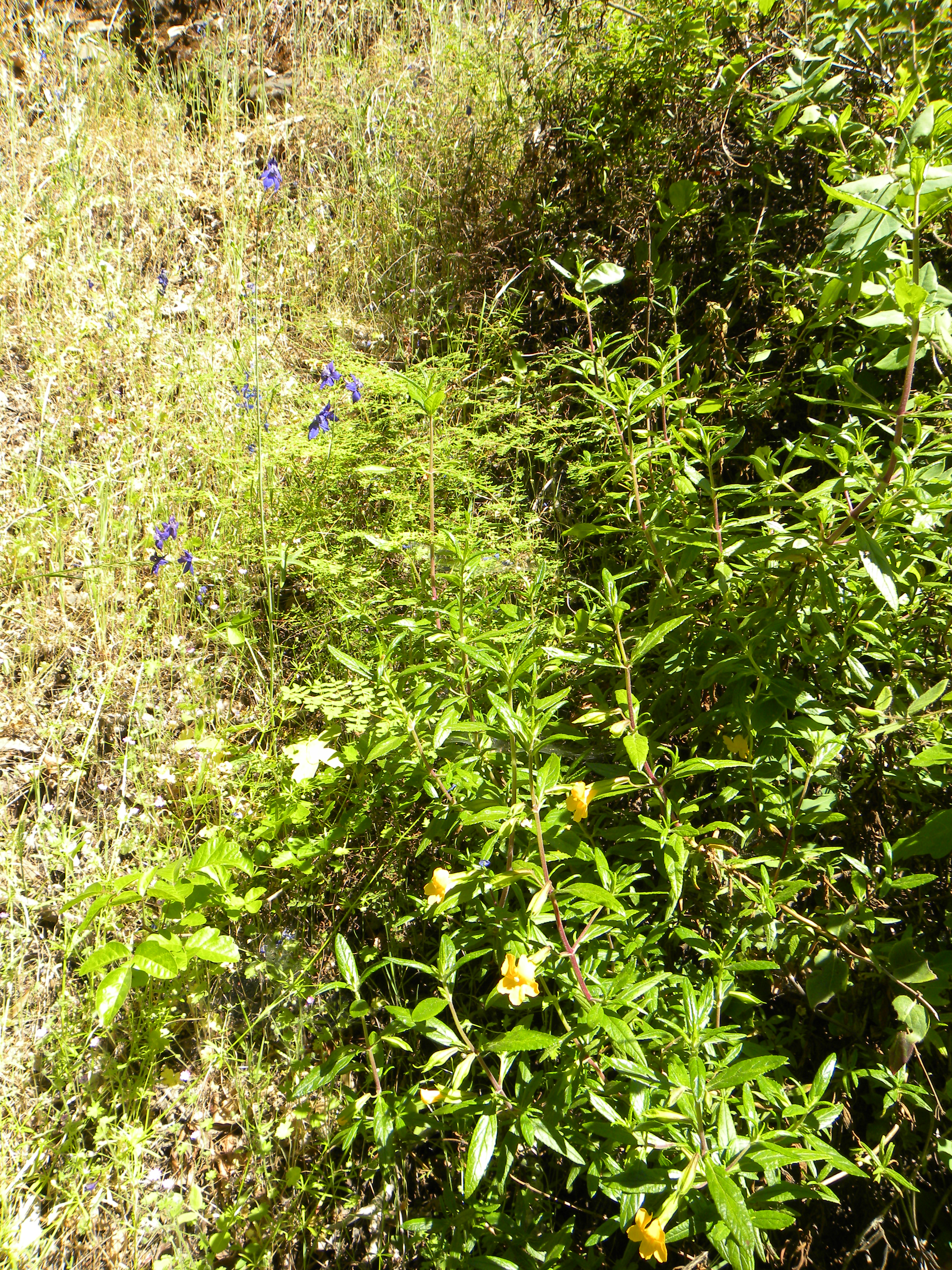
Sticky monkey flowers in the park. The yellowish flowers are pollinated by hummingbirds and bees.

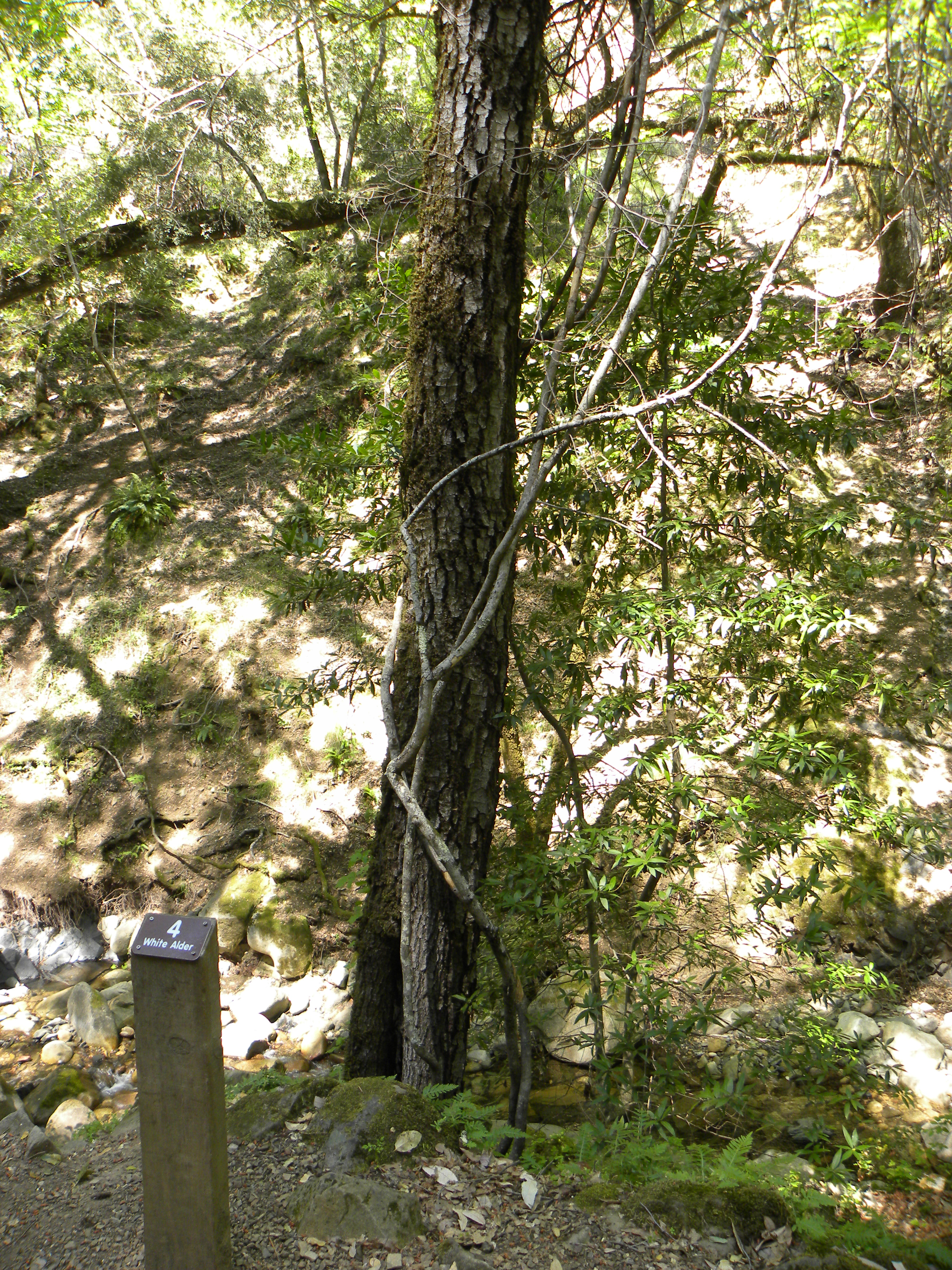
White alder tree overlooking creek in the park. Thick vines of poison oak have grown around the base of the tree.

== Fauna ==
Some animals native to the area include:

- Anna's hummingbird
- Banana slug
- Black-tailed deer
- California carpenter bee
- California forest scorpion
- California newt
- California quail
- Convergent lady beetle
- Coyote
- Mountain lion
- Red-tailed hawk
- Steller's jay
- Santa Cruz garter snake
- California ebony tarantula
- Turkey vulture
- Wild turkey
Fauna in Uvas Canyon County Park
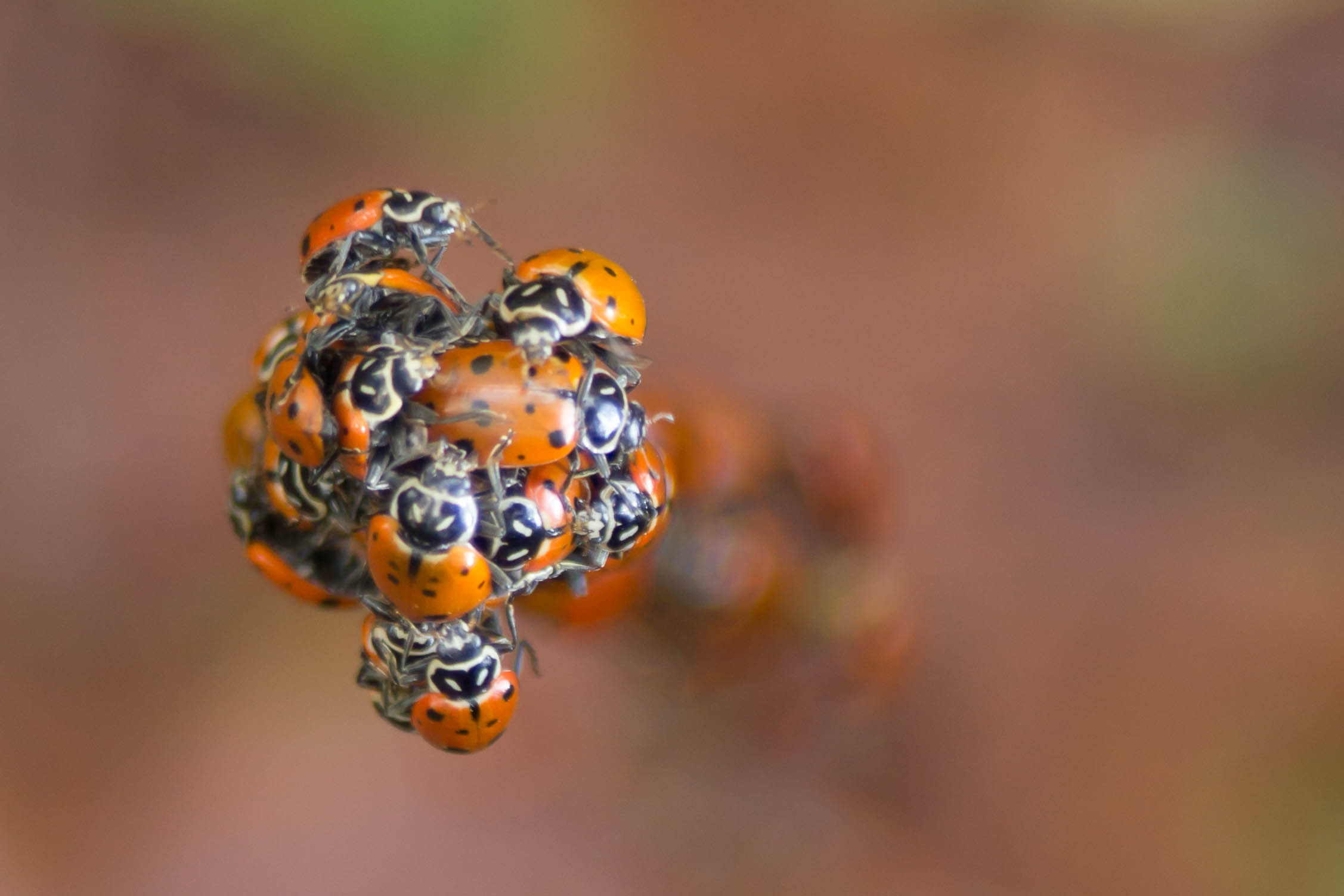
Convergent lady beetles near waterfall trail. Lady Bugs gather in the mountain valleys when they enter their overwintering diapause stage.

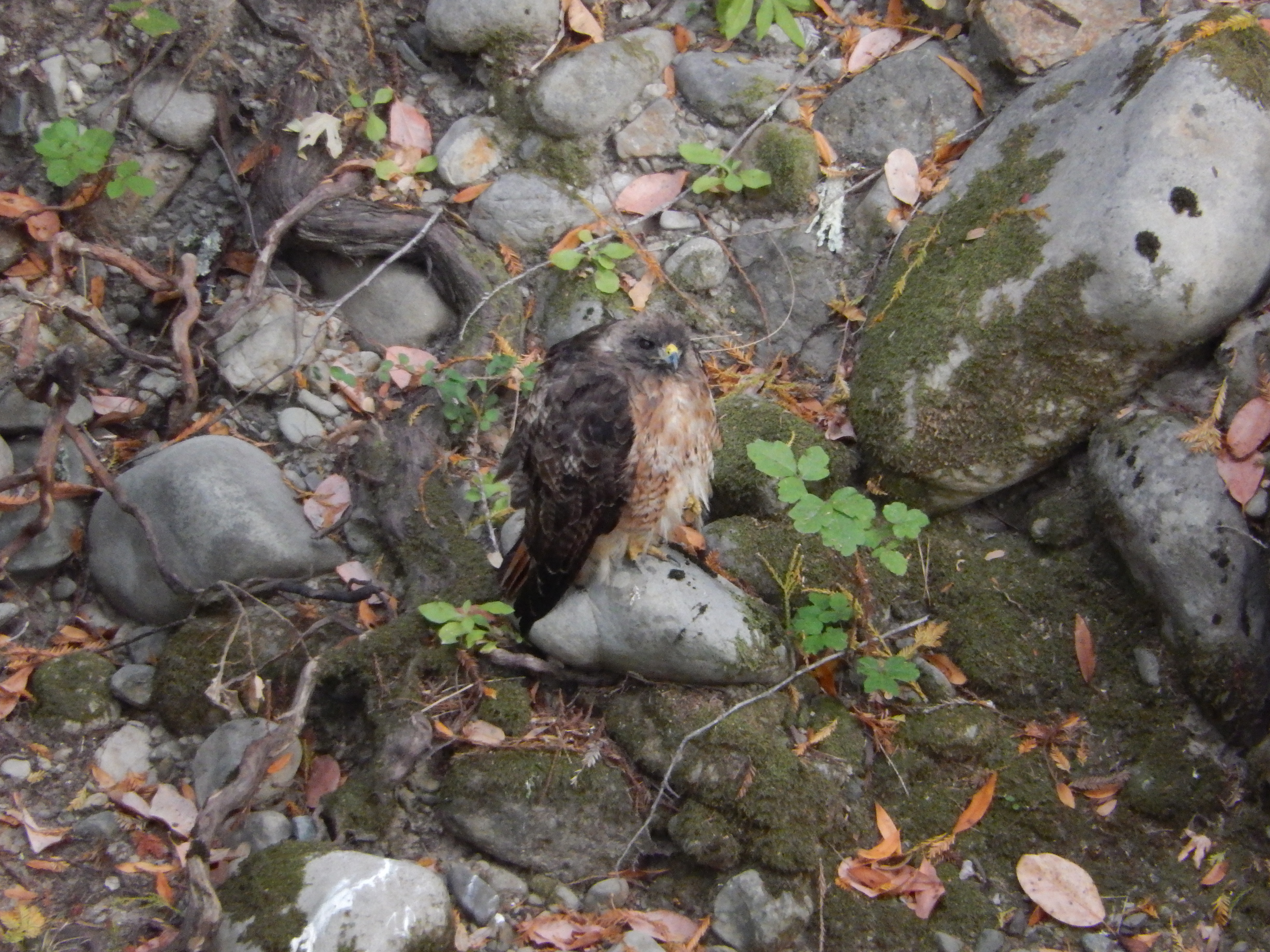
Red-tailed hawk sitting on the banks of Uvas Creek near Sveadal. The hawks prey on steelhead trout that periodically appear in the creek.

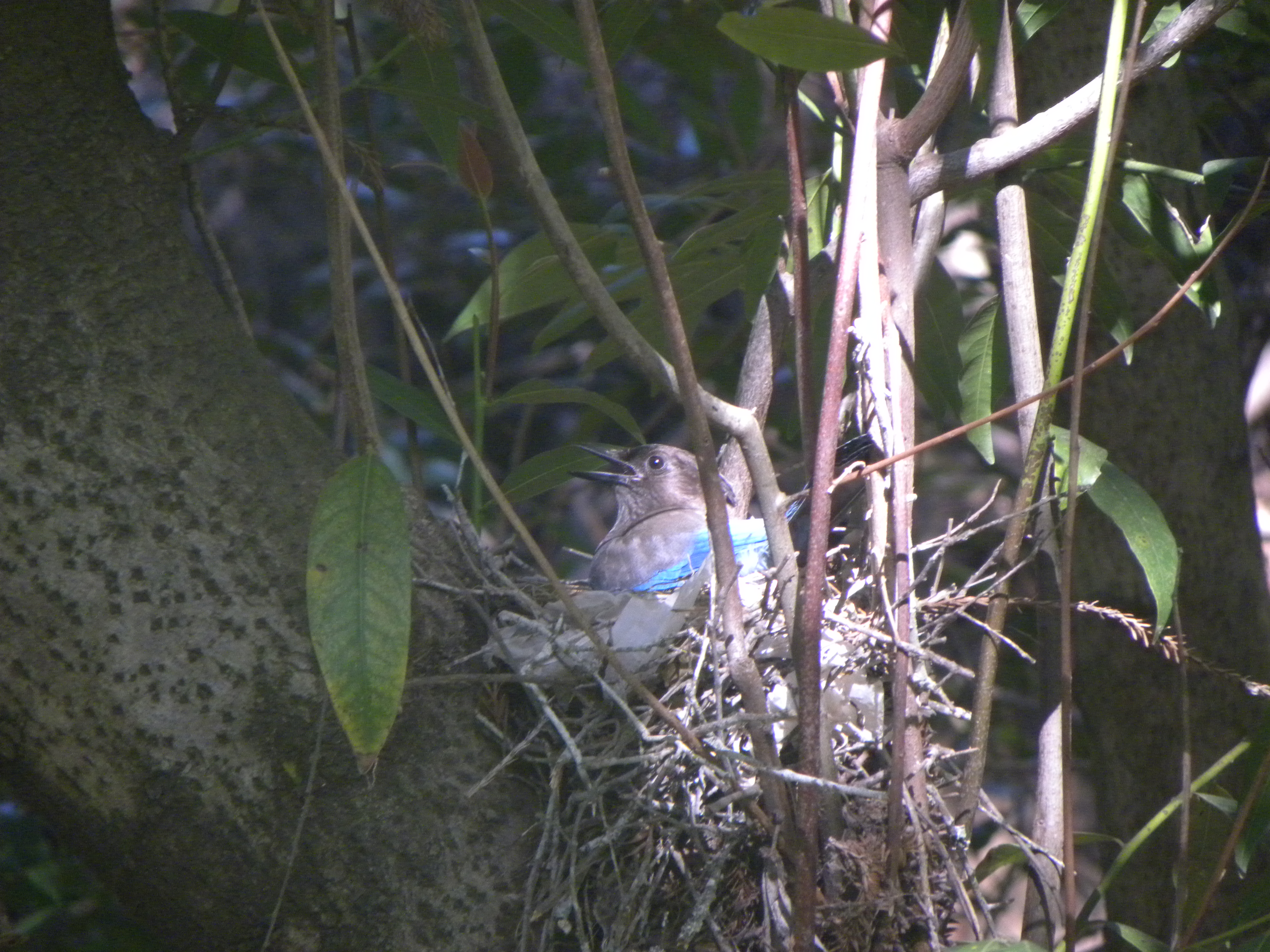
Steller's jay nesting in a California Bay tree near Sveadal. The birds typically nest in the springtime.

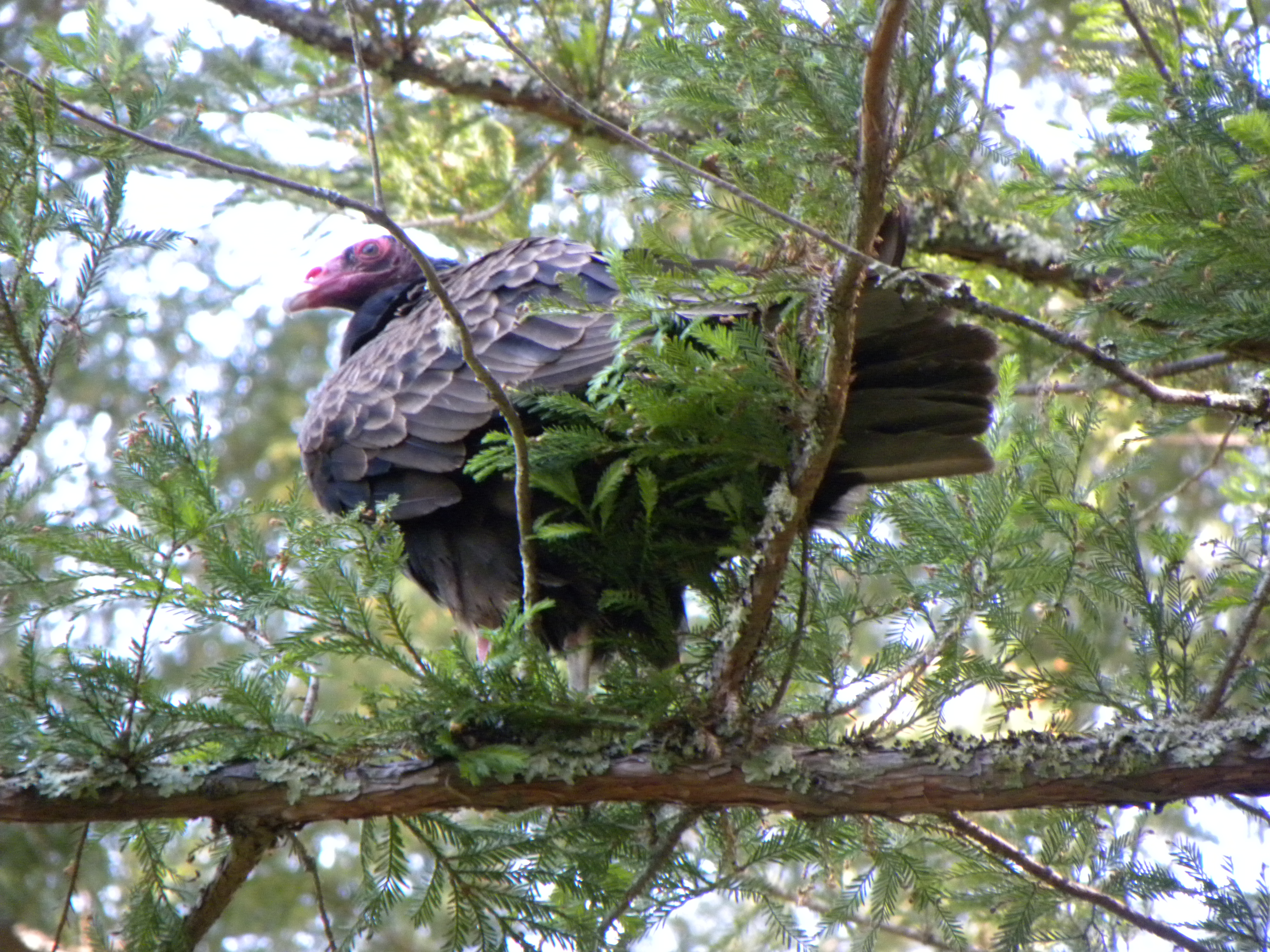
Turkey vulture perched in a redwood tree near Sveadal. The vulture, along with several others nearby, eye carrion below.

== Waterfalls ==
The park has seven small waterfalls, five of which are named on park maps and identified with signposts:

- Basin Falls 37.07973°N 121.80613°W
- Black Rock Falls 37.08246°N 121.80095°W
- Granuja Falls
- Triple Falls 37°04′41″N 121°47′39″W
- Upper Falls 37°04′47″N 121°48′08″W

The streams are rain and spring fed. Even though the streams are perennial, the best time to visit these waterfalls is after recent rains.

Waterfalls of Uvas Canyon County Park
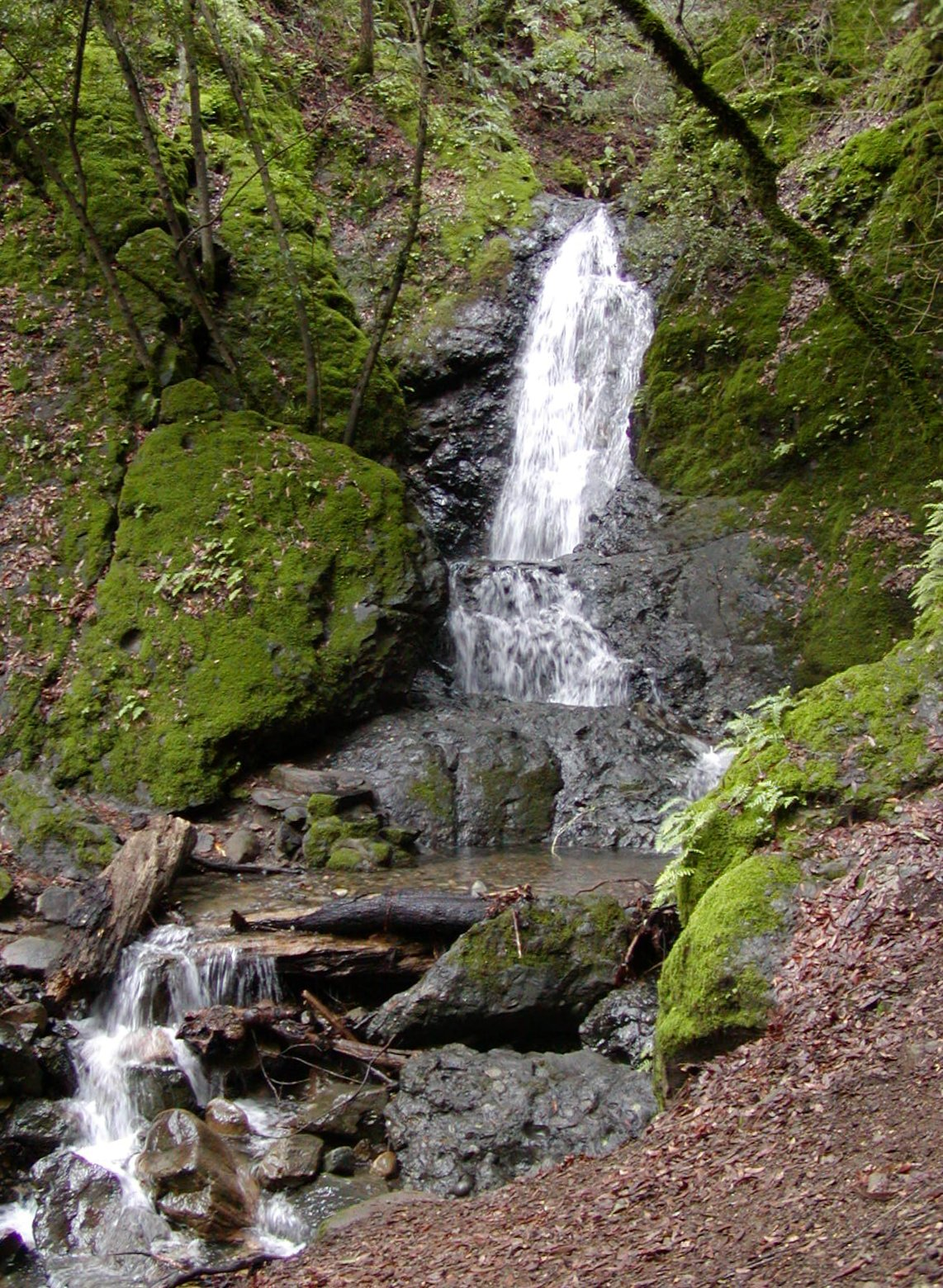
Basin Falls is around 20 feet tall, and is at an elevation of about 1100 ft.

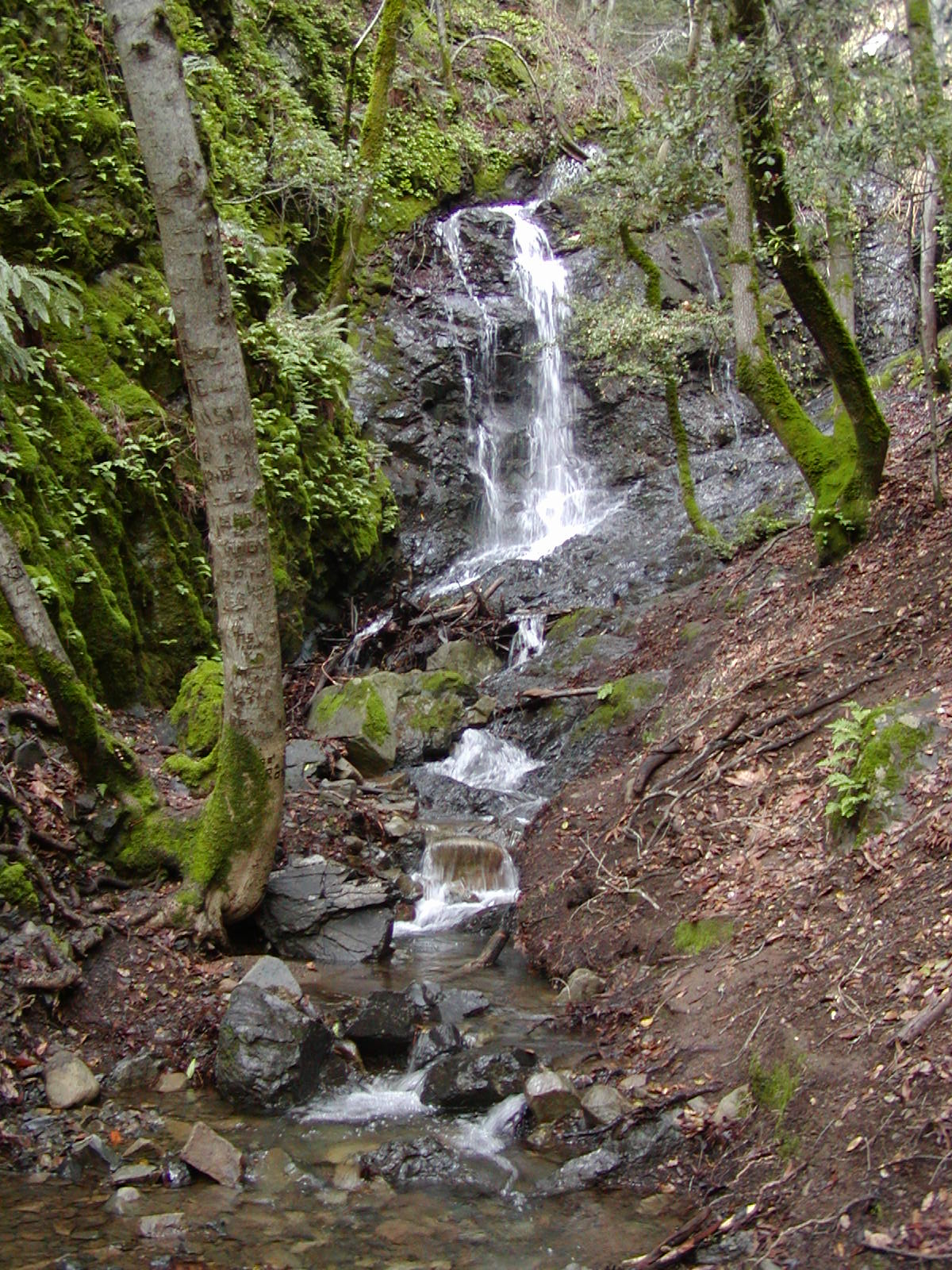
Black Rock Falls

Granuja Falls

Triple Falls is around 35 feet tall.

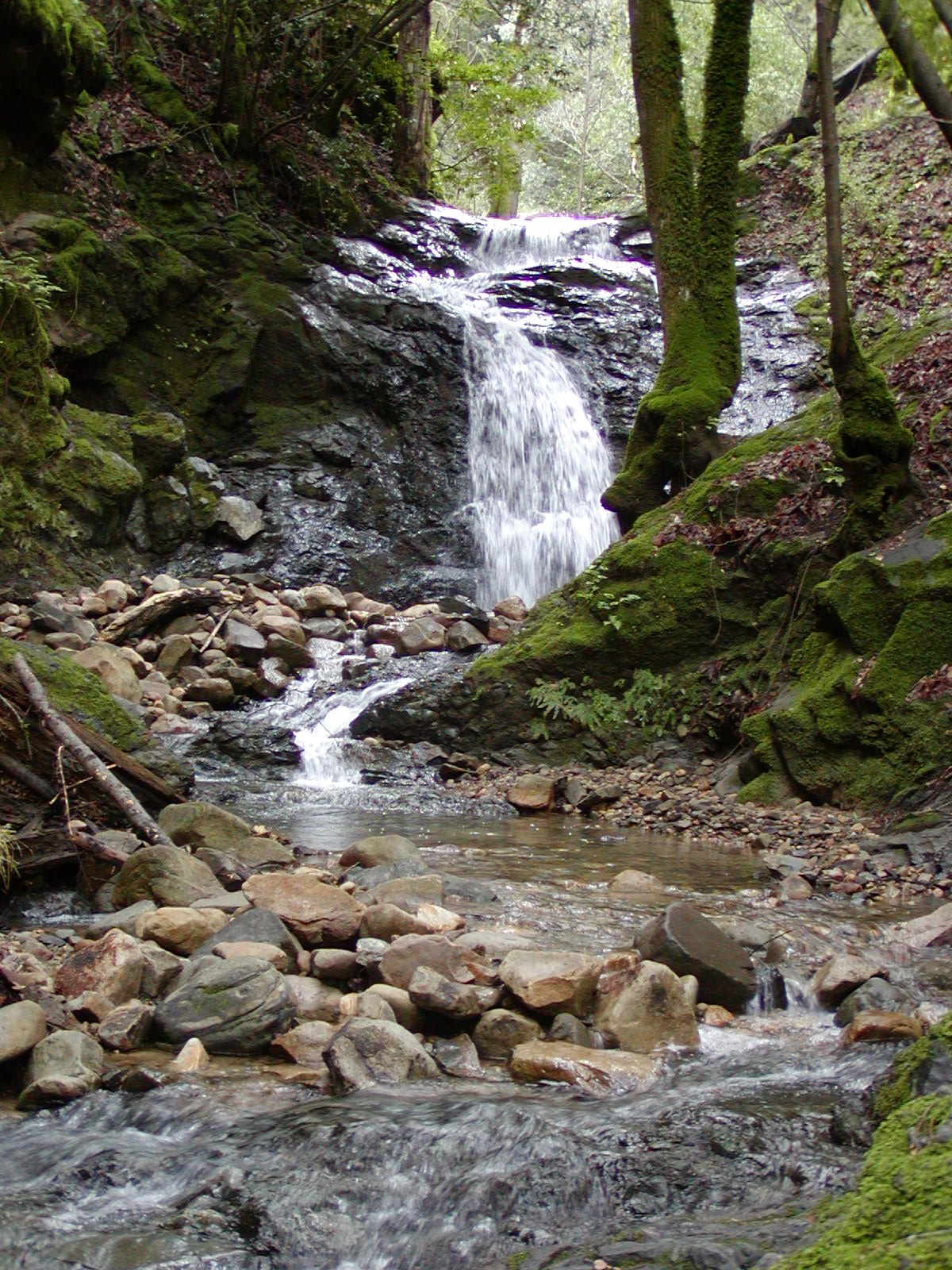
Upper Falls
