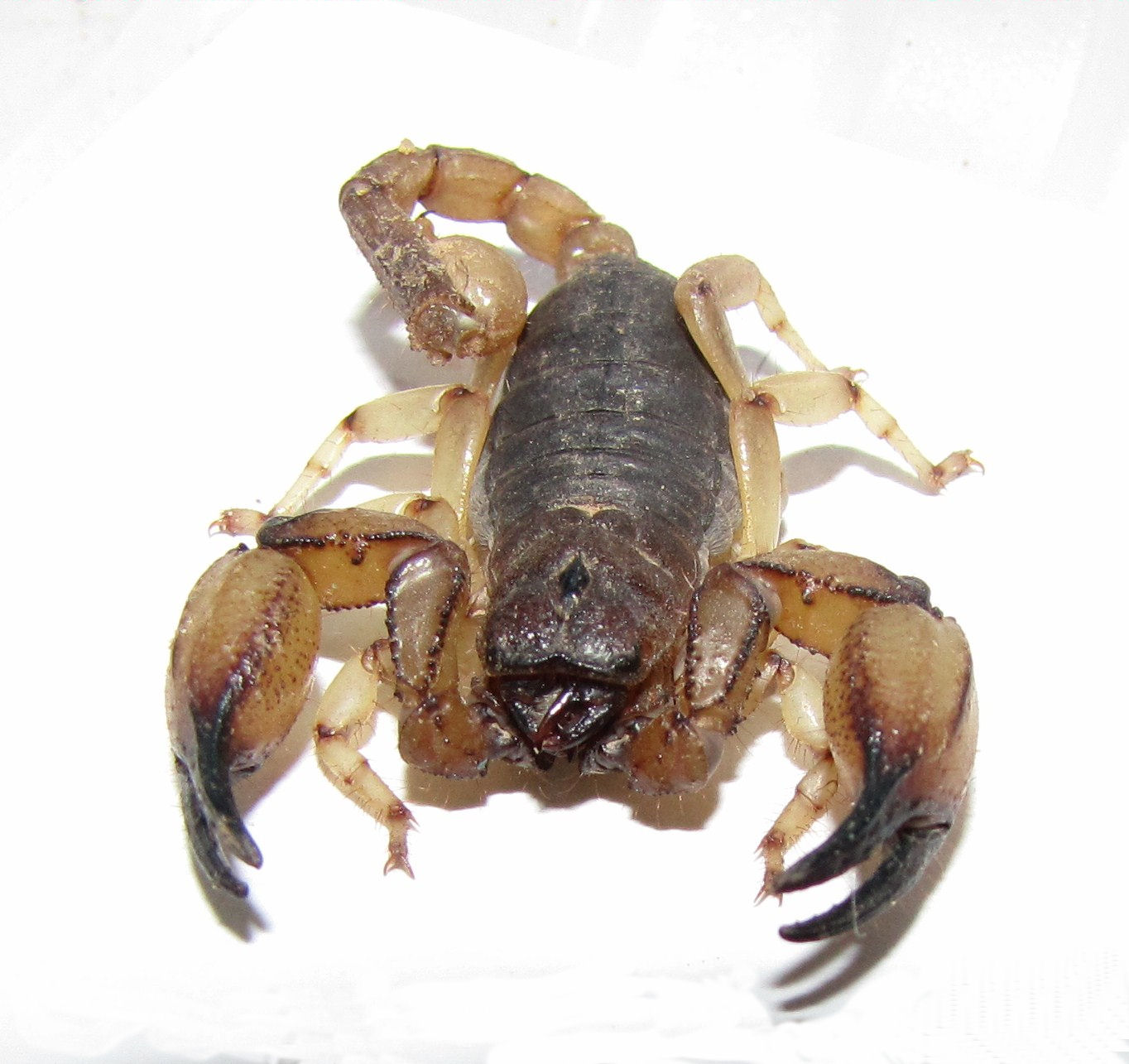
- Anuroctonus pococki

Scientific classification
- Domain: Eukaryota
- Kingdom: Animalia
- Phylum: Arthropoda
- Subphylum: Chelicerata
- Class: Arachnida
- Order: Scorpiones
- Superfamily: Chactoidea
- Family: Chactidae; Pocock, 1893

Subfamilies
- Chactinae Pocock, 1893; Brotheinae Simon, 1879; Uroctoninae

= Chactidae =

Chactidae Temporal range: Cretaceous–present

Family of scorpions

The Chactidae are a family of scorpions established by Reginald Innes Pocock in 1893. They are included in the superfamily Chactoidea.

== Genera ==
Chactidae contains the following genera:

- Anuroctonus Pocock, 1893
- Auyantepuia (Gonzalez-Sponga, 1978)
- Broteochactas Pocock, 1893
- Brotheas C.L. Koch, 1837
- Chactas Gervais, 1844
- Chactopsis Kraepelin, 1912
- Chactopsoides Ochoa, Rojas-Runjaic, Pinto-Da-Rocha & Prendini, 2013
- Guyanochactas Lourenco, 1998
- Hadrurochactas Pocock, 1893
- Megachactops Ochoa, Rojas-Runjaic, Pinto-Da-Rocha & Prendini, 2013
- Neochactas Soleglad & Fet, 2003
- Nullibrotheas Williams, 1974
- Spinochactas Lourenço, 2016
- Teuthraustes Simon, 1878
- Uroctonus Thorell, 1876
- Vachoniochactas Gonzalez-Sponga, 1978
