= Glaser =

Glaser is a surname that is derived from the occupation of the glazier, or glass cutter.

== Notable persons with this surname ==
- Albrecht Glaser (born 1942), German politician
- Barney Glaser (1930–2022), American sociologist
- Benny Glaser (born 1989), World Series of Poker multiple event winner
- Chris Glaser (activist), writer and minister of religion
- Chris Glaser (American football) (born 1999), American football player
- Christopher Glaser (1615 – c. 1670), Swiss chemist
- Daniel Glaser, Deputy Assistant Secretary in the US Department of Treasury
- Dave Glaser (1921-2001), British Royal Air Force officer and Battle of Britain fighter pilot
- Donald A. Glaser (1926–2013), Nobel prize winner in physics
- Eduard Glaser (1855–1908), Austrian Arabist and archaeologist
- Elizabeth Glaser (1947–1994), American AIDS activist
- Elizabeth Glaser (artist) (fl. 1815–1830), American folk artist
- Emmanuel Glaser (born 1964), French Lawyer
- Franjo Glaser (1913–2003), Croatian footballer
- Fritz Salo Glaser (1876–1956), German Jewish lawyer and art collector
- Georg K. Glaser (1910–1995), German writer
- Joe Glaser (1896–1969), American talent agent
- Johann Glaser (1629–1675), Swiss anatomist
- Judith E. Glaser, American author and businessperson
- Julius Anton Glaser (1831–1885), Austrian jurist and politician
- Karina Yan Glaser (born 1979 or 1980), American author
- Milton Glaser (1929–2020), American graphic designer
- Nikki Glaser (born 1984), American television host of Not Safe with Nikki Glaser
- Paul Michael Glaser (born 1943), American actor
- Peter Glaser (1923–2014), American scientist
- Peter Gläser (1949–2008), German musician
- Petr Glaser (born 1988), Czech footballer
- Rob Glaser (born 1962), founder of RealNetworks, Inc.
- Robert Glaser (1921–2012), educational psychologist
- Ronald Gläser (born 1973), German politician
- Vera Glaser (1916–2008), American journalist and feminist
- Vladimir Jurko Glaser (1924–1984), Croatian theoretical physicist
- Werner Wolf Glaser (1910–2006), German-born Swedish composer, musician, and poet
- Tompall & the Glaser Brothers, American country music vocal trio
  - Jim Glaser (1937–2019)
  - Tompall Glaser (1933–2013)

== See also ==
- Gläser-Karosserie, a German coachbuilder
- Glasner
- Glasser
- Glassner
- Glessner
- Glazar
- Glazer
- Cor-Bon/Glaser, an ammunition manufacturer
  - Glaser Safety Slug
