= Glaize =

Glaize is a surname. Notable people with the surname include:

- Léon Glaize (1842–1931), French painter
- Lydia Glaize, American politician
- Maurice Glaize (1886–1964), French architect and archaeologist

== See also ==
- Glaze
- Glaize Creek
- Grand Glaize Bridge
