= Deglazing =

Deglazing refers to the removal of a shiny or smooth surface.

- Deglazing (cooking), using a liquid to remove cooked-on residue from a pan
- Deglazing (engine mechanics), abrading the polished surface of a cylinder
- Removal of the ceramic glaze from pottery

== See also ==
- Glaze (disambiguation)
