= Communications Hill, San Jose =

Neighborhood of San Jose in Santa Clara, California, United States

Communications Hill
- Neighborhood of San Jose
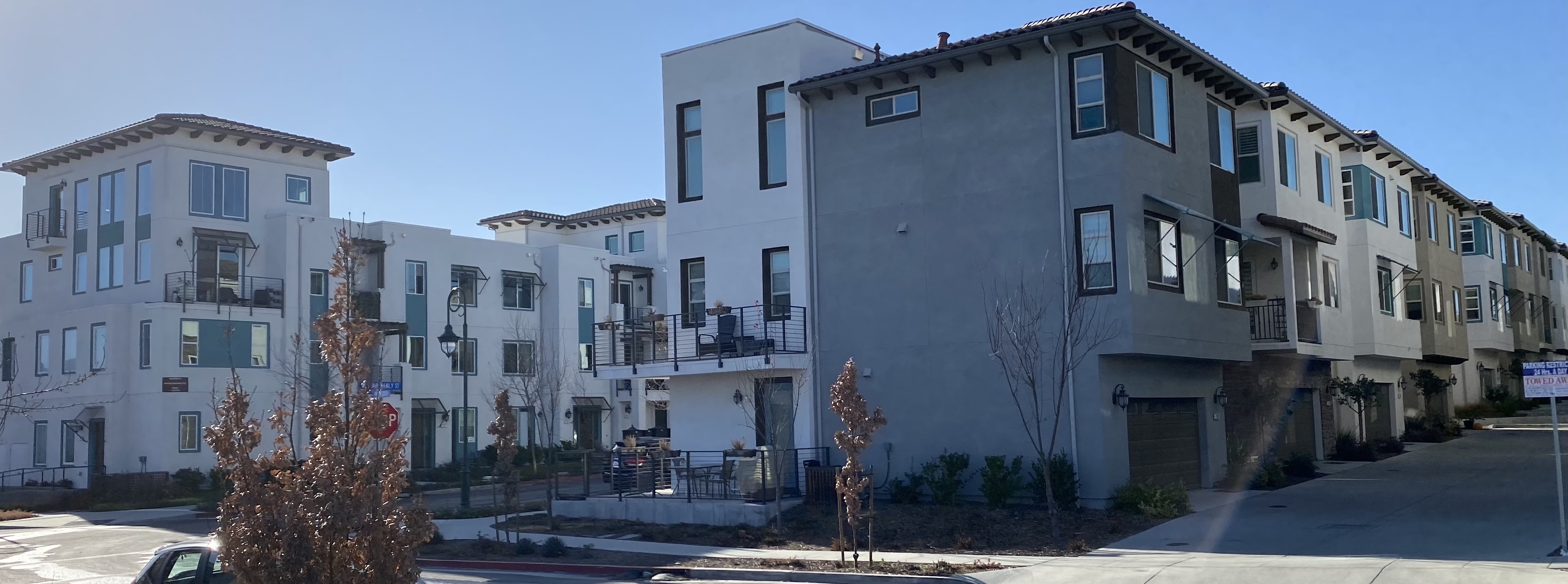
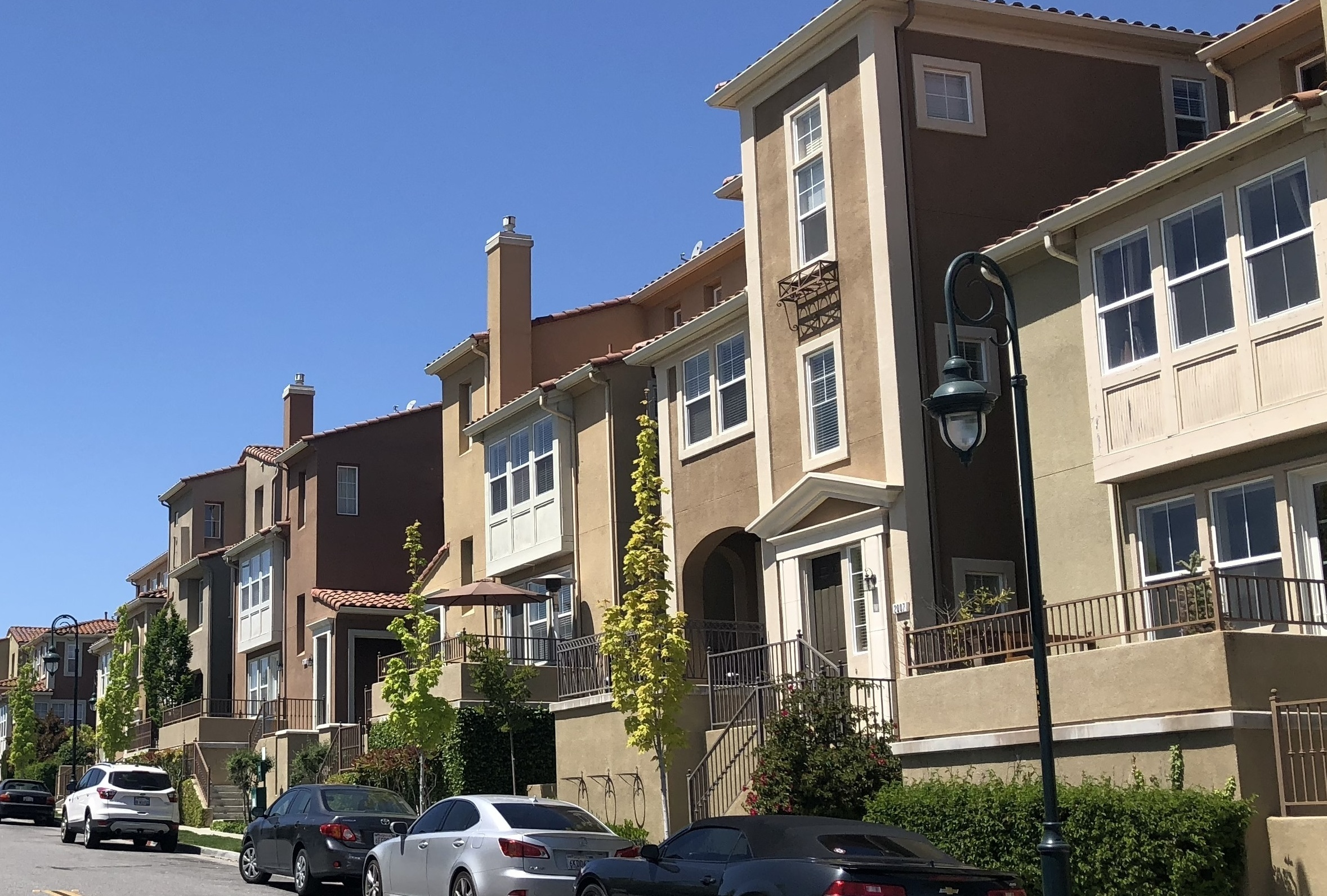
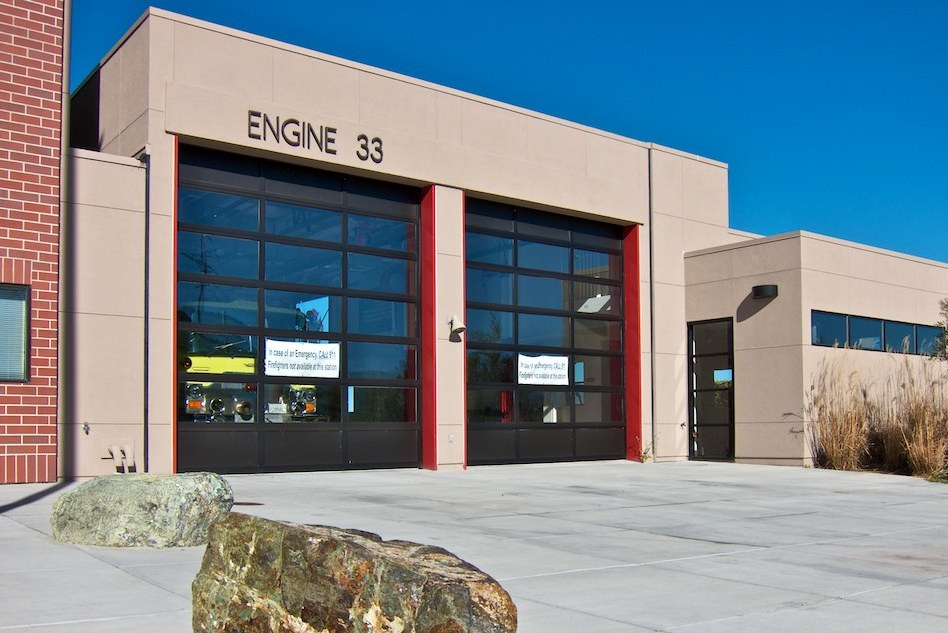
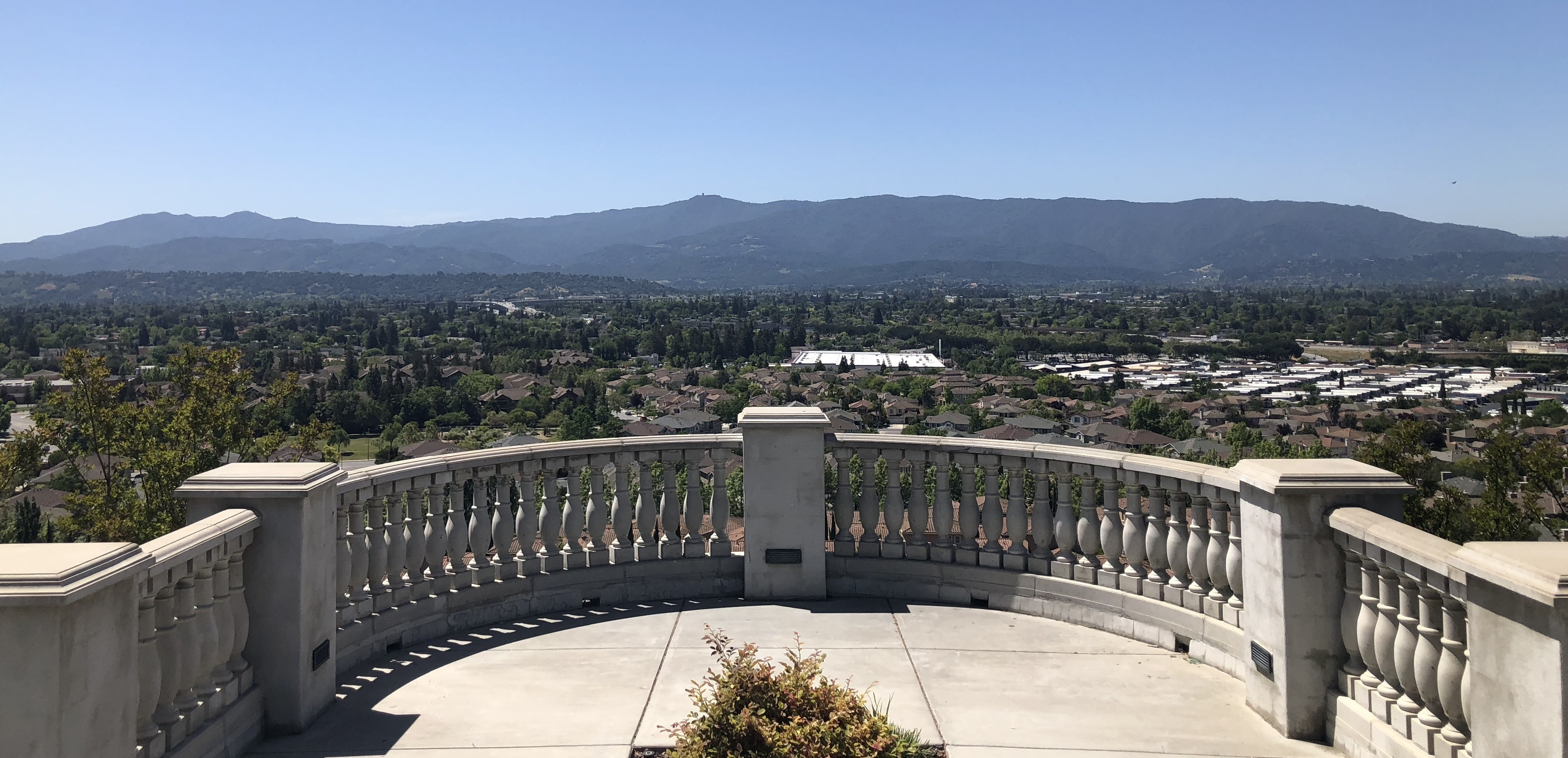
- Interactive map of Communications Hill
- Coordinates: 37.2890°N 121.8551°W
- Country: United States
- State: California
- County: Santa Clara
- City: San Jose
- Elevation: 438.9 ft (133.77 m)

Population (2016)
  - Total: 11,267

Communications Hill is a neighborhood located in the San Juan Bautista Hills of San Jose, California.

== History ==
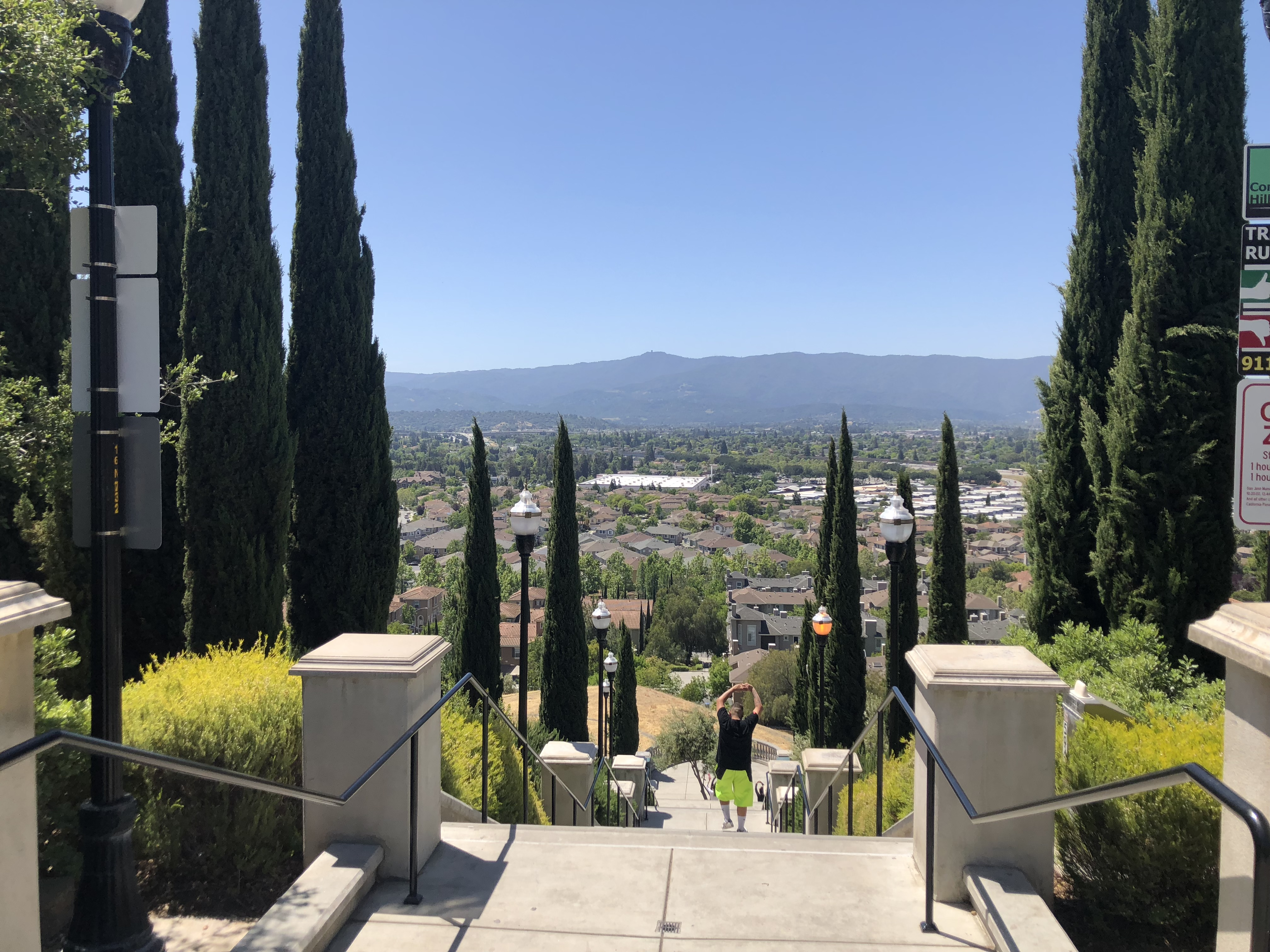
The Communication Hill stairs

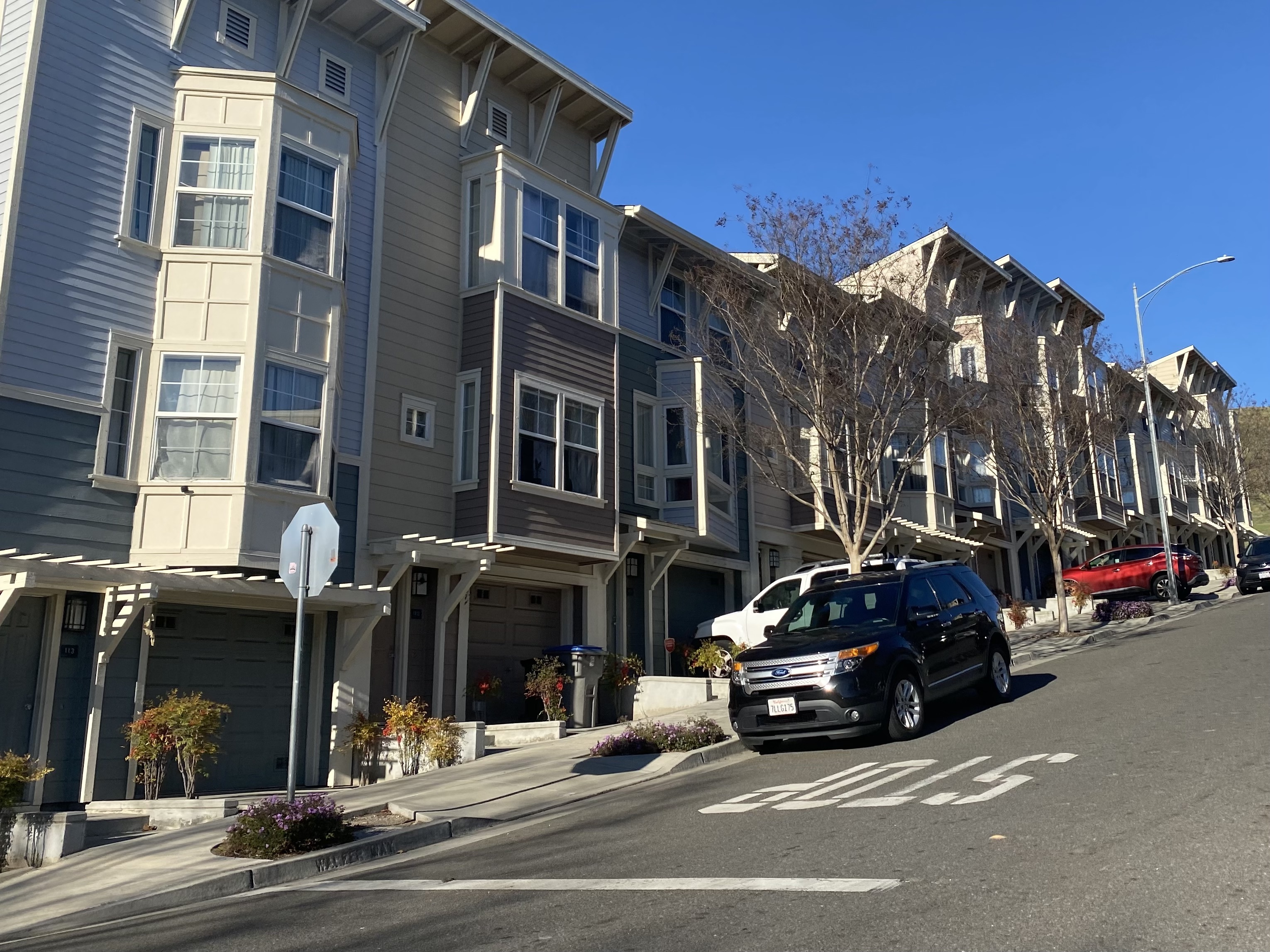
Rowhouses on Azores Street

Before the Spanish entrada, the Tamyen people mined the area for chert, which was typically used for debitage and arrow points.

On November 29, 1777, Juan Bautista de Anza selected the area to become the southernmost region in the first land tract of the San Jose pueblo (the first pueblo-town in California not associated with a mission or a military post). Although similarly named, the San Juan Bautista Hills were not part of the neighboring Rancho San Juan Bautista Mexican land grant.

Located in the northern area of Communications Hill, Oak Hill Memorial Park, the oldest secular cemetery operating in California, performed its first recorded burial in 1847.

Tyler Beach purchased the Dairy Hill area in the late 1860s and named it Beach Hill Farm, which was used to supply the former St. James Hotel.

On March 2, 1886, Southern Pacific incorporated the San Jose & Almaden Railroad (consolidated with the Southern Pacific on May 14, 1888) to build the Lick Branch from Hillsdale (now Capitol Station) 7.7 miles to Almaden. The branch was opened on November 16, 1866, and ran for several years. However, the line was shortened due to an abandonment in 1937 (probably due to the New Almaden mine shutting down after the Great Depression). The remainder of the Lick Branch was formally abandoned in January 1981.

Between 1887 and 1890, the San Jose Vineyard operated in the area.

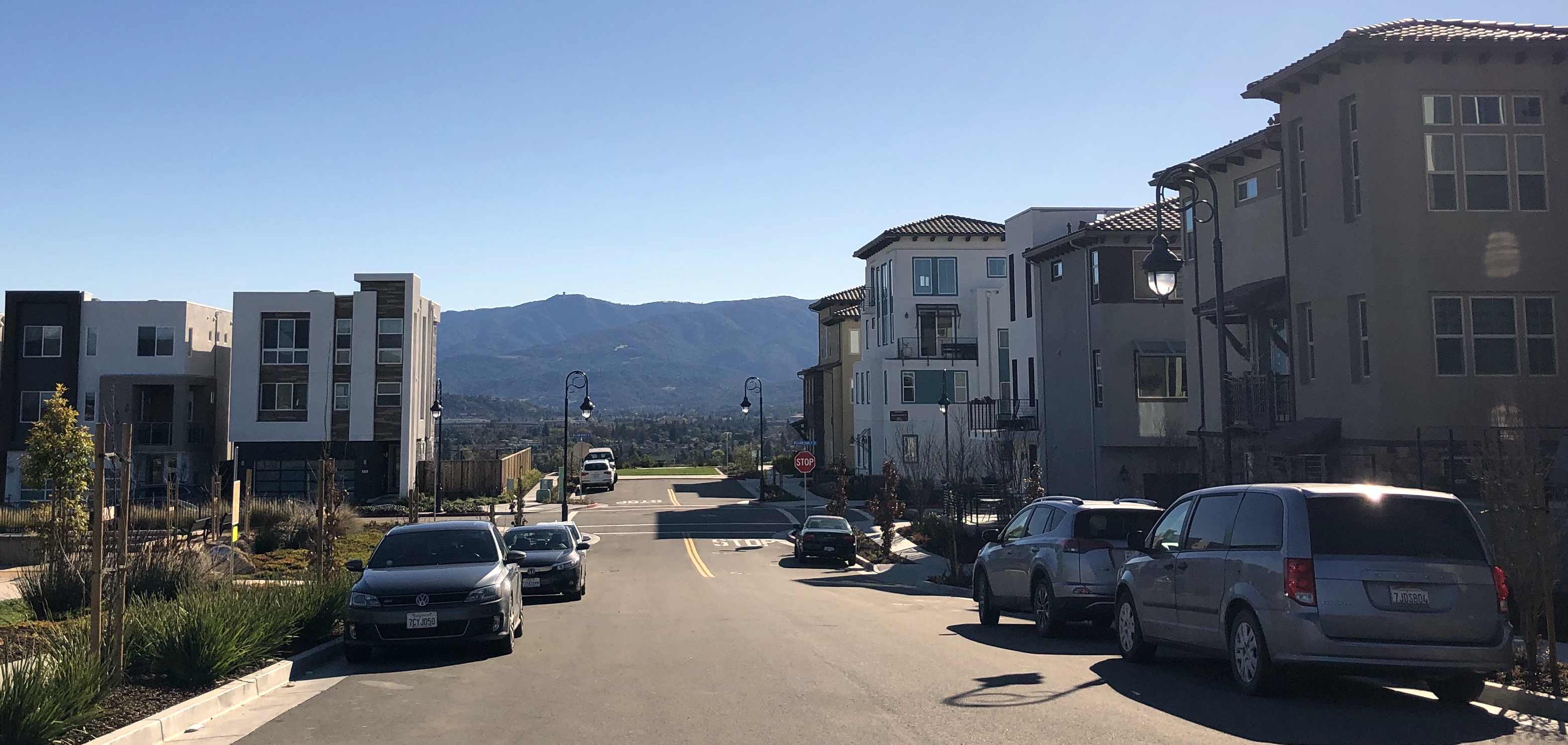
View of the Santa Cruz Mountains in the west from Communications Hill

In the late 1800s, José S. Azevedo (of the Azevedo-Machado-Vieira family, a prominent Portuguese-American family of San Jose) emigrated from São Jorge Island in the Azores. He purchased 96 acres of land in the area in 1896 and created a dairy farm known as the American Dairy Company.

In 1916 (after José S. Azevedo's passing in 1915), Manuel Azevedo and Manuel Lewis took over the dairy farm. Manuel Azevedo's nephew, Manuel Bettencourt managed the creamery after Manuel Azevedo died. After Manuel Bettencourt died, control of the dairy went to Bettencourt's nephew, Antonio Bettencourt. In the 1970s, control of the ranch passed to Antonio Bettencourt's son, Robert J. Bettencourt who continues own land in the area through a family trust known as Mta Land Corporation.

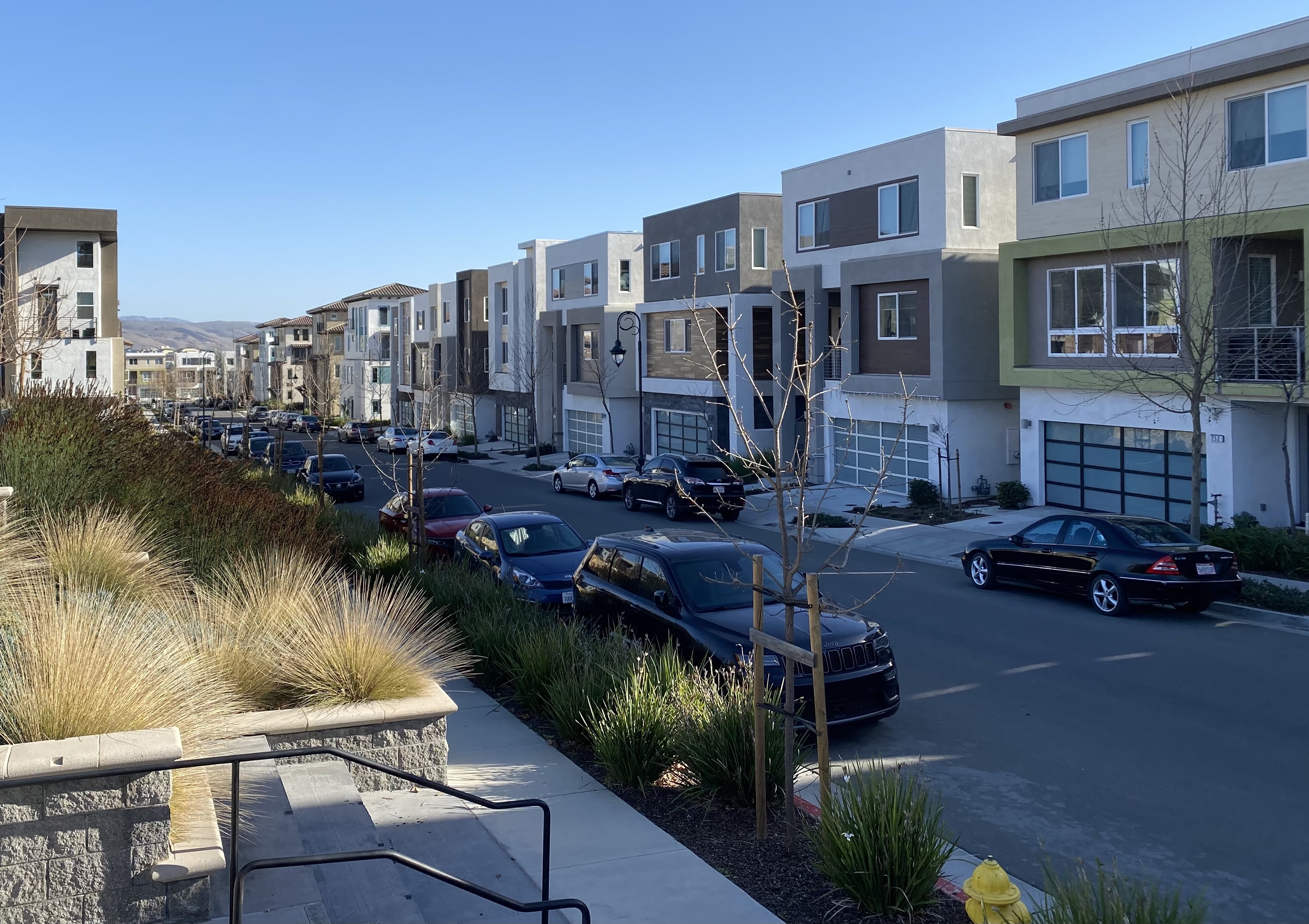
Townhomes on William Manly St.

The Azevedo Quarry was actively mined by Raisch Products from 1971 to 2006 (reclamation activity continued until 2009). An aggregate recycling facility remains on the land, but it is also expected to shutdown in 2023 and be redeveloped into an office park when the county use permit expires.

Starting in 1984, the Government of San Jose began preparing Communications Hill, then largely barren, for development into a mixed-use, high density, urban neighborhood. This was formalized with the creation of the Communications Hill Specific Plan in 1992. Mta Land Corporation, a family trust managed by the Bettencourt family, began the process of residential development in 2002.

Annexation of parcels to the city of San Jose has occurred as recently as December 9, 2014.

The area is currently undergoing significant construction, which has been divided into four phases.

A "village center", which is under construction as of December 2024, will include shops and restaurants positioned to have a view of the downtown San Jose skyline.

== Long Lines Tower ==
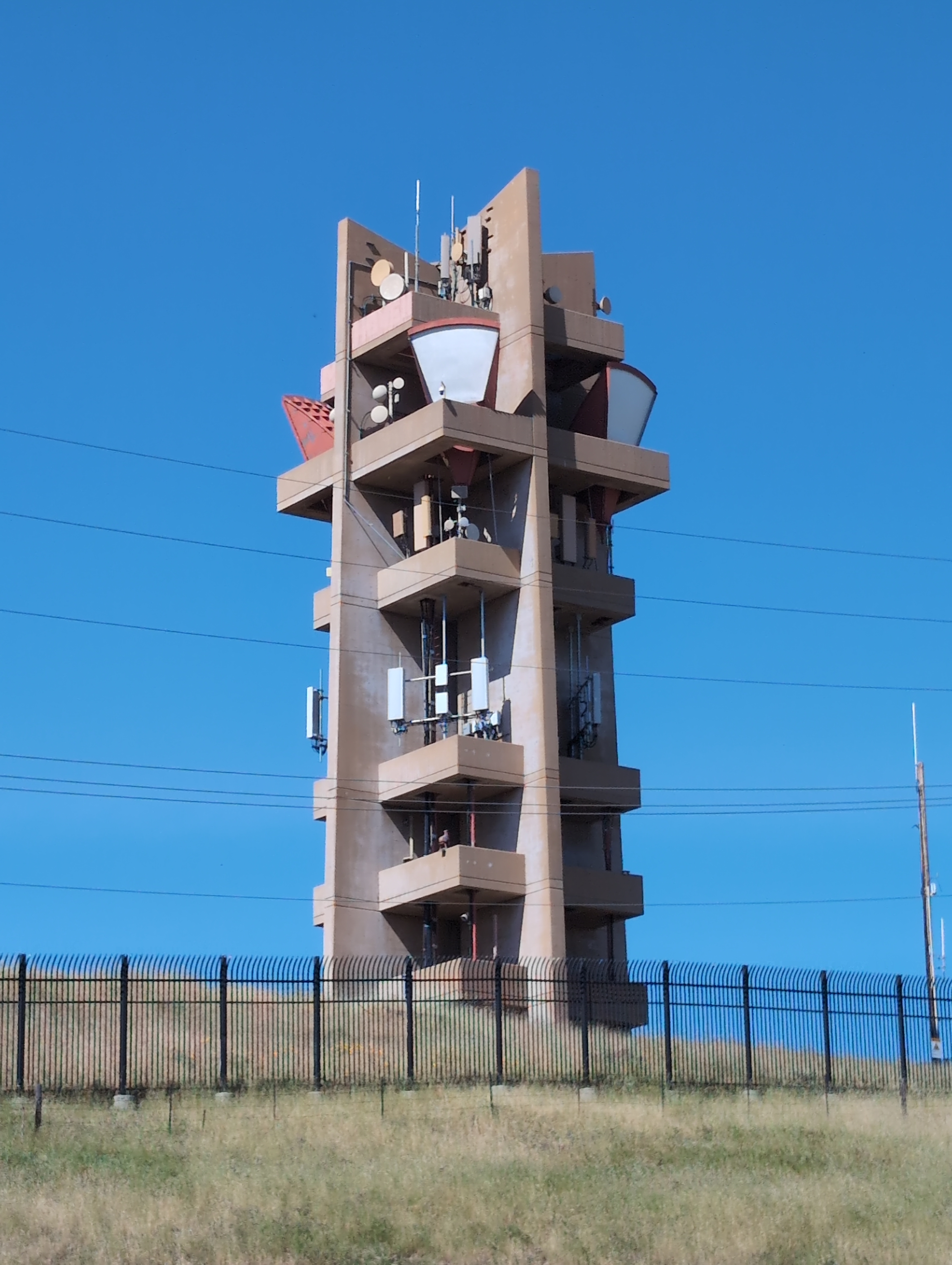
AT&T Long Lines tower on Communications Hill, San Jose

The brutalist tower located prominently on the hill was part of the AT&T Long Lines telecommunications network. Known as the "Oak Hill" tower and constructed in 1972, it was designed to hold KS-15676 horn antennas to relay data between the San Jose long lines tower (located at Almaden Blvd and West San Fernando St.) and the long lines tower on Hogsback Ridge (near East Dunne Ave). The tower has several levels of underground facilities (such as offices, bathrooms, a lunch room, and storage areas).

== Geography ==
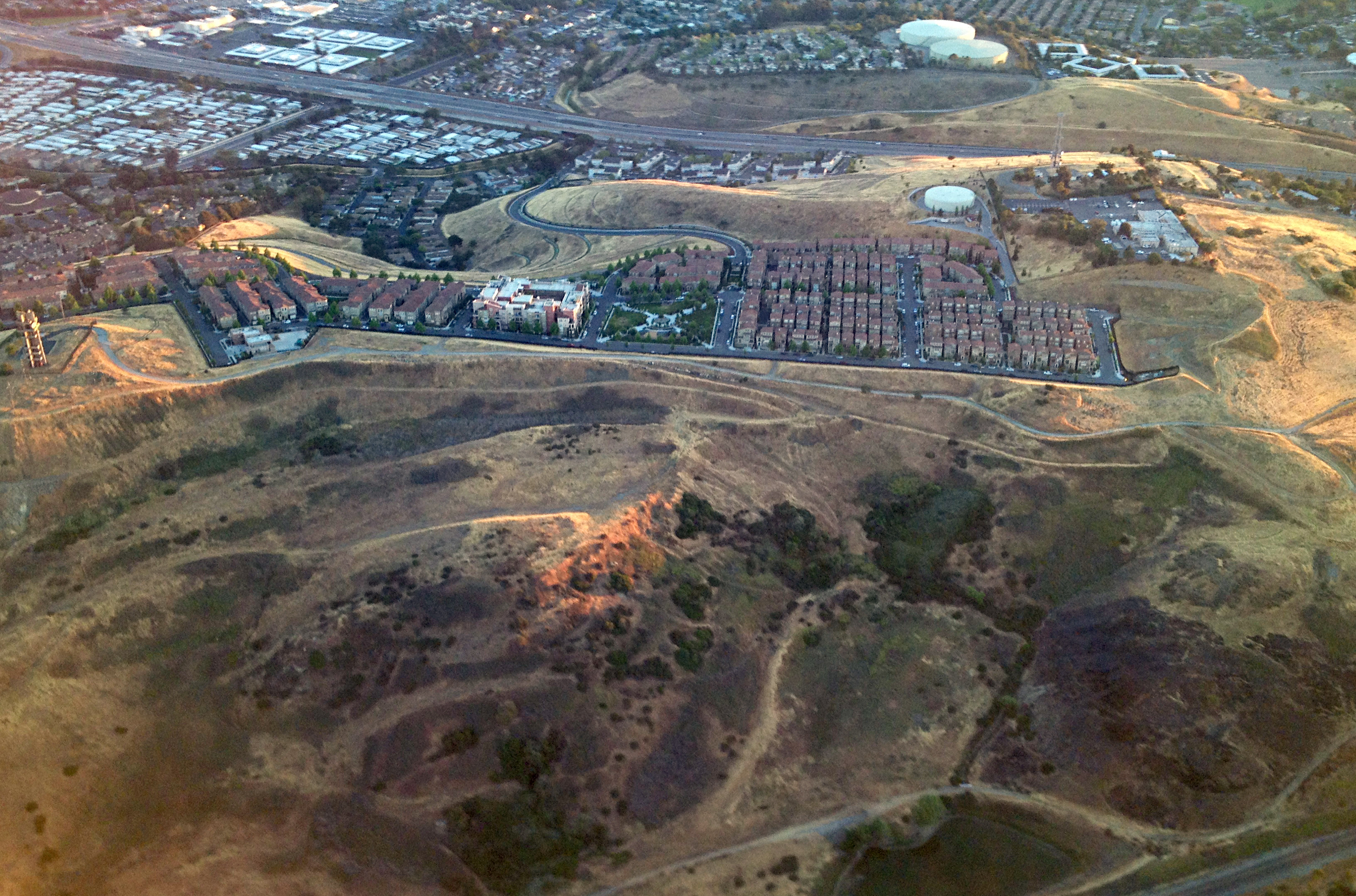
Aerial view of much of Communications Hill, with Vieira Park in the center

The Communications Hill neighborhood is located east of California State Route 87, west of Monterey Road, north of Capitol Expressway and south of Curtner Avenue.

== Parks and trails ==
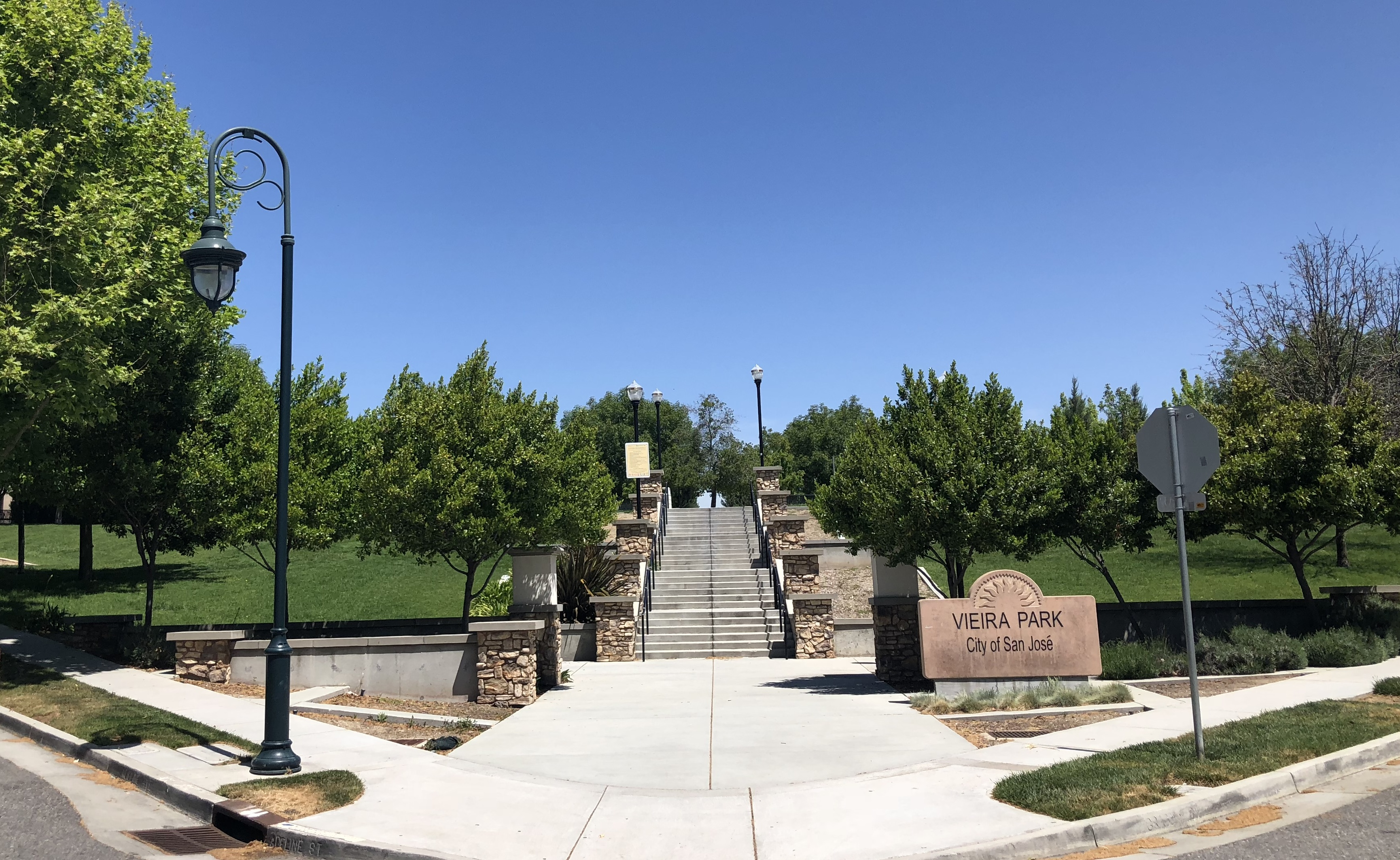
Vieira Park

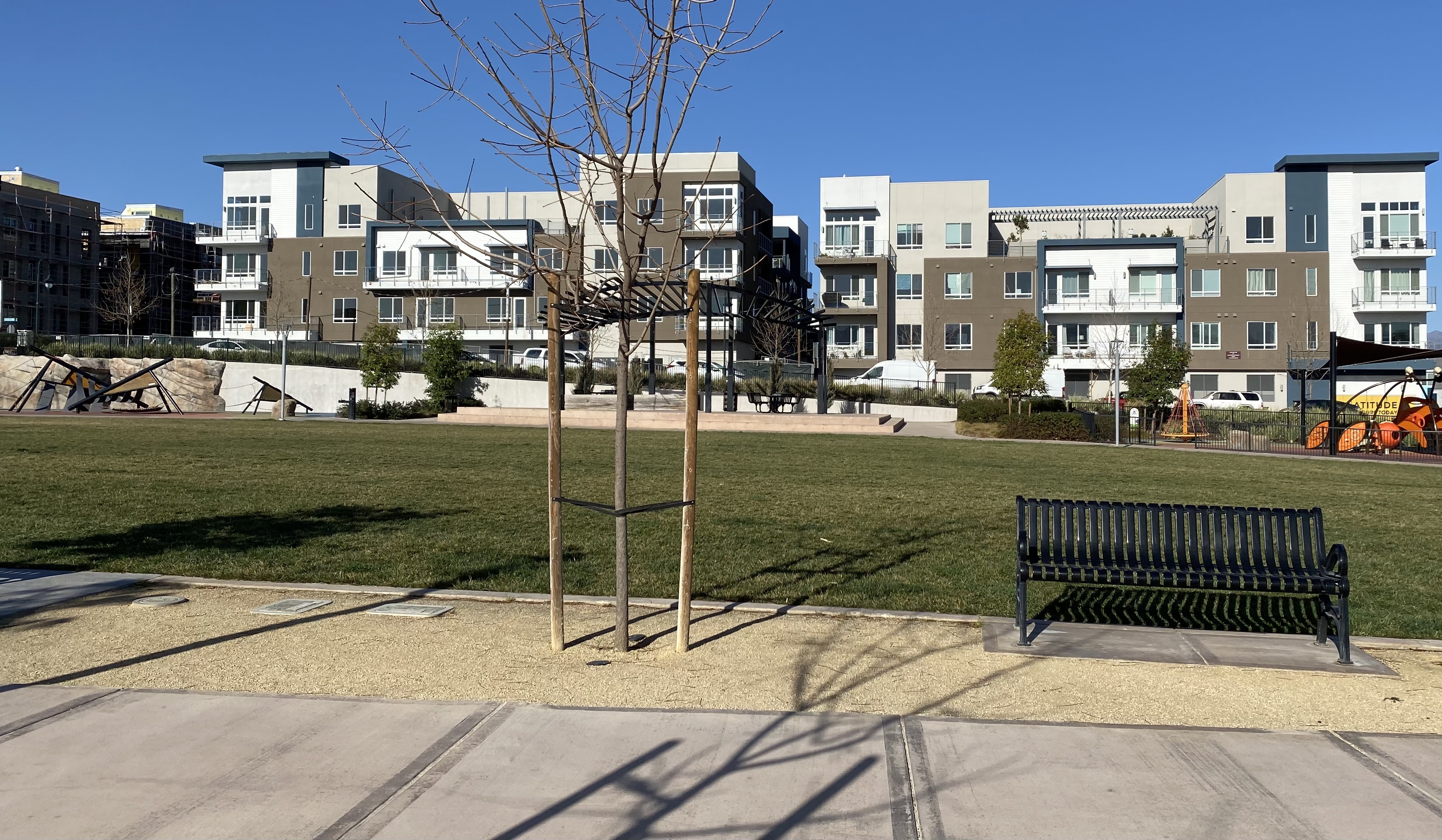
William Manly Park

The neighborhood has multiple scenic overlooks of the Santa Cruz Mountains, Diablo Range, and the surrounding Santa Clara Valley.

Communications Hill is home to the following parks and trails:

- Azevedo Park
- Communications Hill Dog Park
- Communications Hill Grand Staircase
- Communications Hill Trail
- Elaine Richardson Park
- Hillsdale Fitness Park
- Hillcrest Open Space
- Kurte Park
- Margaret Kell Park
- Rancho San Juan Bautista Park
- Vieira Park
- Waterford Park
- William Lewis Manly Park

== Transportation ==
Nearby public transportation options include:

- Capitol station (VTA) for light rail.
- Capitol station (Caltrain) for commuter rail.
- Curtner station for light rail.

A pedestrian bridge and trail are planned to allow easier access to the Capitol Caltrain station.

== Public services ==
Communications Hill is home to Engine House 33 of the San José Fire Department.

The hill is also home to the Santa Clara County Communications Dispatch center (which handles 9-1-1 calls for the county).
