= Glaze (surname) =

Glaze is a surname. Notable people with the surname include:

- Andrew Glaze (1920–2016), American poet
- Ralph Glaze (1882–1968), American athlete and coach
- Ivory Glaze, Australian drag queen
- Peter Glaze (1917–1983), English comedian
- Terry Glaze (born 1964), American singer
- Tom Glaze (1938–2012), justice of the Arkansas Supreme Court

== See also ==
- Glazer, surname
- Glaser, surname
