= Sulphur Springs, Missouri =

Unincorporated community in Missouri, U.S.

Coordinates: 38°20′10″N 90°22′26″W

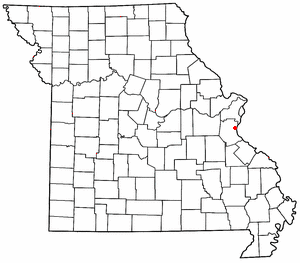

Sulphur Springs is an unincorporated community in eastern Jefferson County, Missouri, United States. It is located near Barnhart, bordering the banks of Glaize Creek and the Mississippi River.

Sulphur Springs was platted in 1860, and named for a sulphur spring near the original town site. A post office was established at Sulphur Springs in 1837, and remained in operation until 1990.

On August 5, 1922, at Sulphur Springs, two trains collided on the Iron Mountain Railroad tracks, resulting in 34 people killed and 150 injured in the largest train accident in Missouri history.

== Notable person ==
- Benjamin O'Fallon
- Benjamin Raborg
