= Bernice C. Downing =

American newspaper publisher and editor (1878–1940)

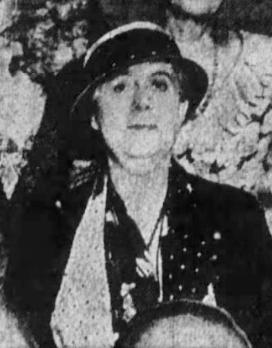
- Downing in 1932
- Born: 1878; Newark, Missouri, US
- Died: September 26, 1940 (aged 61–62); Santa Clara, California, US
- Burial place: Oak Hill Memorial Park
- Occupation(s): Newspaper publisher, editor, postmaster, speaker

Bernice C. Downing (1878 – September 26, 1940) was an American newspaper publisher, editor, postmaster and speaker. She and her twin sister, Bertha C. Downing, were the first women in California to own, edit and publish their own newspaper, the Santa Clara Journal.

== Early life ==
Bernice C. Downing was born in 1878, in Newark, Missouri, the daughter of Nathan Hall and Ida R. Downing. The Downings were pioneer residents of Santa Clara, California, where they moved in 1886.

== Career ==
=== Newspaper editor and publisher ===
Bernice C. Downing was an editor and newspaper publisher. Downing and her twin sister, Bertha C. Downing (1878–1925) inherited the Santa Clara Journal from their father upon his death in 1905 when they were 17 years old. They transformed the Santa Clara Journal from a free press to a paying proposition.

=== Postmaster ===
She was appointed postmaster of Santa Clara in 1922 by President Warren G. Harding, and was reappointed to office in 1927 by President Calvin Coolidge. She held this position for 12 years. She founded and edited the California Postmaster, the official organ of the postmasters' association. She then became hostess of the Mission Trails building at Treasure Island until 1940, a few months before her death.

=== Speaker ===
In 1937, she spoke in front of the Soroptimists Club about her travels through Europe, the talk "Cargo Cruising". She also spoke in front of the Women's Luncheon Club on the subjects "On a Freighter to Europe" and "Rural England". Downing spent eight months with one suitcase and a typewriter first aboard a freighter and then in Europe and England. She told how she was refused entrance to Italy having applied for a visa as a "journalist".

In 1938, she spoke in front of the Santa Cruz Business and Professional Women's Club. Also in 1938, she was appointed official hostess and director of personnel for the Mission Trails Building at the 1939 Golden Gate International Exposition.

In 1940, a few months before her death, she remembered her twin sister, who had died in 1925, in a speech to the Soroptimists Club.

== Affiliations and memberships ==
She held several offices in, and was president of, the state association and national vice-president of the League of American Pen Women. She was also California vice-president of the National Editorial Association. In 1930, she became national secretary of the League of American Pen Women.

In 1927, she won a specially created prize from the Omaha Chamber of Commerce for the best paper written on a tour of Nebraska and the Black Hills of South Dakota. This contest was open to all members of the National Editorial Association. In 1928, she won third prize in The National Editorial Association contest with the piece "Tennessee's Hydroelectric Power Possibilities and the Advantages of Its Development by Private Capital".

She was a member of the California Press Association and secretary of the Santa Clara County Consolidated Chamber of Commerce.

In 1936, she was the leader of a Troop sponsored by the Thousand Oaks Parent-Teacher Association.

For several years she was a member of the Santa Clara County Republican Committee.

== Personal life ==
Downing lived at 1516 Franklin St., Santa Clara, California. She died on September 26, 1940, aged 61 or 62, and is buried at Oak Hill Memorial Park in San Jose.
