= Glazar =

Glazar is an occupational surname of Slovenian, Croatian and Polish origin, meaning "glass maker". Notable people with the surname include:

- Richard Glazar (1920–1997), Czech holocaust survivor and author
- Václav Glazar (1952–2018), Czech actor, playwright and screenwriter

== See also ==
- Glaser, a cognate
- Glazer
