= Glassner =

Glassner, Glässner or Glaessner is a surname of German origin, a variant of Glasner, which in turn is a variant of Glaser, an occupational surname meaning "glass maker". Notable people with the surname include:

- Andrew Glassner (born 1960), American computer graphics expert
- Barry Glassner (born 1952), American professor and sociologist
- Erika Glässner (1890–1952), German actress
- Jean-Jacques Glassner (born 1944), French historian
- Jonathan Glassner (fl. 1987–present), American television writer, director and producer
- Martin Glaessner (1906–1989), Austro-Hungarian-born geologist and paleontologist
- Michael Glassner (born 1963), American political adviser and commentator

== See also ==
- Glessner, a cognate
