= Glessner =

Glessner is a surname of German origin, a variant of Glaser, which is an occupational surname of German, Dutch, Ashkenazic, English, Polish, Croatian, Slovenian, Czech or Slovak origin meaning "glass maker". Notable people with the surname include:

- German Glessner (born 1974), Argentine-born athlete and businessman
- Katherine Glessner (born 1986), American rower
- Thomas Glessner (fl. 1987–present), American lawyer

== See also ==
- Frances Glessner Lee (1878–1962), American forensic scientist
- John J. Glessner House, a historic house in Chicago, Illinois
- Glessner Bridge, a historic bridge in Somerset County, Pennsylvania
- Glassner, a cognate
