= Edward Alexander Walker =

United States Marine Corps Medal of Honor recipient

- Born: October 2, 1864; Huntly, Scotland
- Died: October 4, 1946 (aged 82); San Jose, California
- Burial place: Oak Hill Memorial Park San Jose, California
- Military career
- Allegiance: United States of America
- Branch: United States Marine Corps
- Service years: 1896–1922
- Rank: Sergeant
- Conflicts: Boxer Rebellion
- Awards: Medal of Honor

Edward Alexander Walker (October 2, 1864 – October 24, 1946) was a Sergeant serving in the United States Marine Corps during the Boxer Rebellion who received the Medal of Honor for bravery.

== Biography ==
Walker was born October 2, 1864, in Huntly, Scotland to David Walker and Barbara Cooper. In 1868 his family immigrated to the United States. He joined the Marine Corps from Brooklyn in October 1896, and was sent as a private to China to fight in the Boxer Rebellion.

He received the Medal of Honor for his action in Peking, China from on June 20 – July 16, 1900.

In 1904 he married Mary Owens and together they lived in Pennsylvania until 1922 when he retired from the Marine Corps. They never had any children and after retirement they moved to San Jose, California. He was an active member of First Methodist Church, the Army and Navy Legion of Valor, the Marine Corps League, Wheaton Camp, United Spanish War Veterans of San Jose and Major Randolph T. Zane Post 344, Veterans of Foreign Wars until his death. He was killed in an auto accident October 24, 1946 in San Jose, California. He is buried in Oak Hill Memorial Park San Jose, California.

== Medal of Honor citation ==
Rank and organization: Sergeant, U.S. Marine Corps. Born: 2 October 1864, Huntley, Scotland. Accredited to: New York. G.O. No.: 55, 19 July 1901.

Citation:

In the presence of the enemy during the battle of Peking, China, 20 June to 16 July 1900. Throughout this period, Walker distinguished himself by meritorious conduct.

== See also ==
- List of Medal of Honor recipients
- List of Medal of Honor recipients for the Boxer Rebellion
