= Vieira Park =

Park in San Jose, California

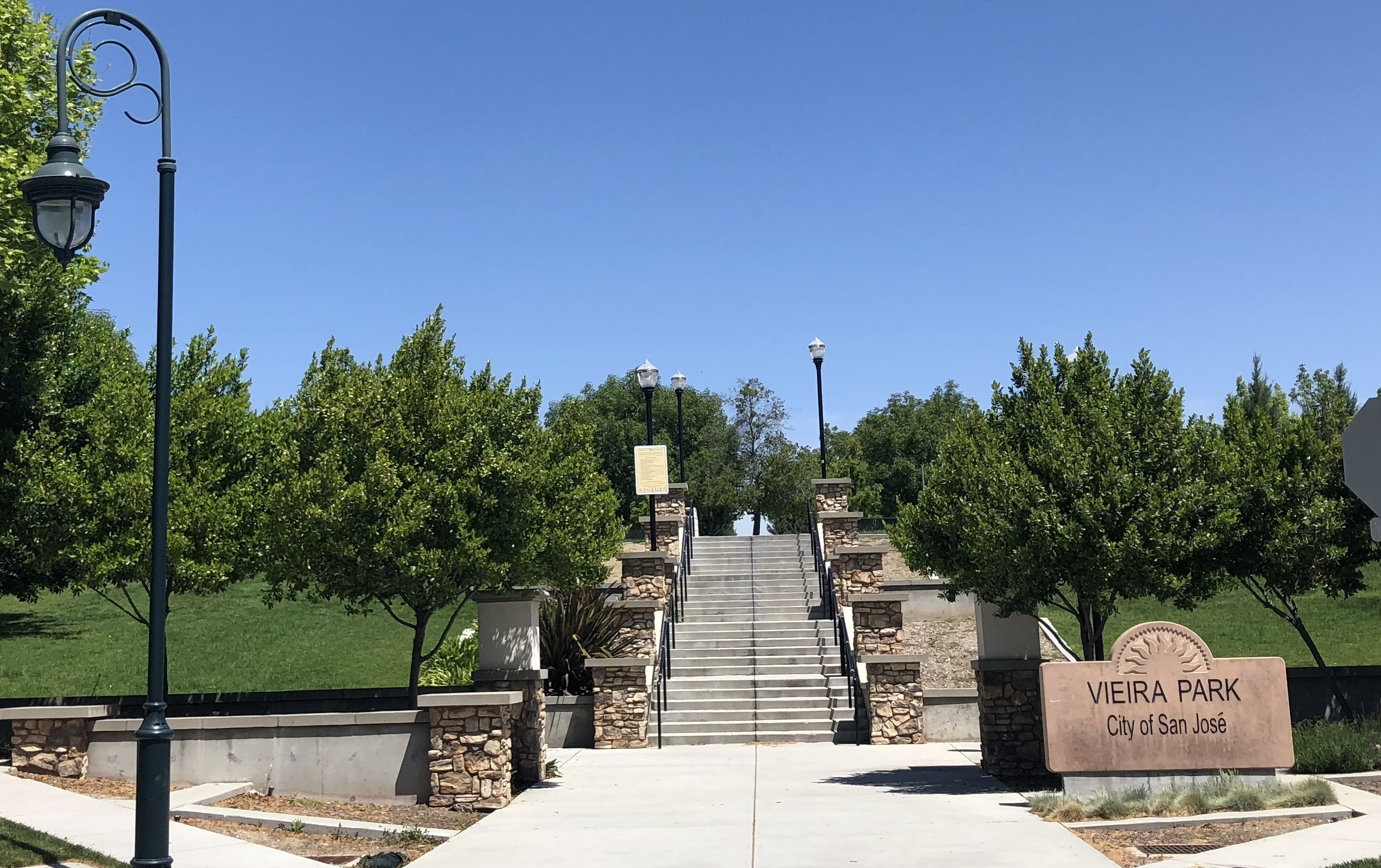
- Interactive map of Vieira Park
- Location: San Jose, California
- Coordinates: 37.28670°N 121.86142°W
- Area: 2 acres (0.81 ha)

Vieira Park is a park in San Jose, California, on Communications Hill.

== History ==
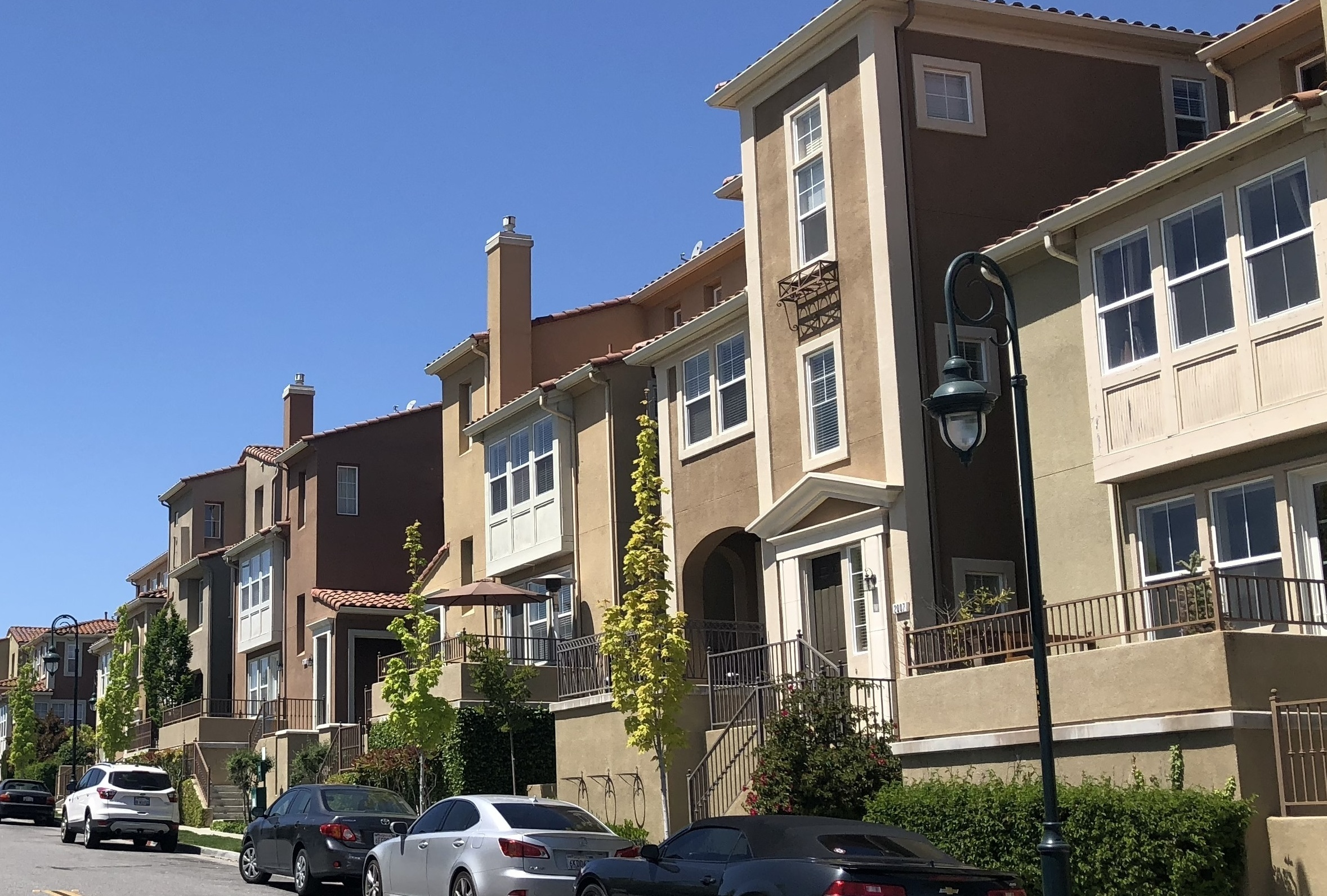
Houses on Vieira Park

Vieira Park was laid out and dedicated in 2004.

The park is named after the Vieira family, a prominent Portuguese-American family of San Jose, of Azorean origin, which has owned land on Communications Hill since 1896.

== Location ==
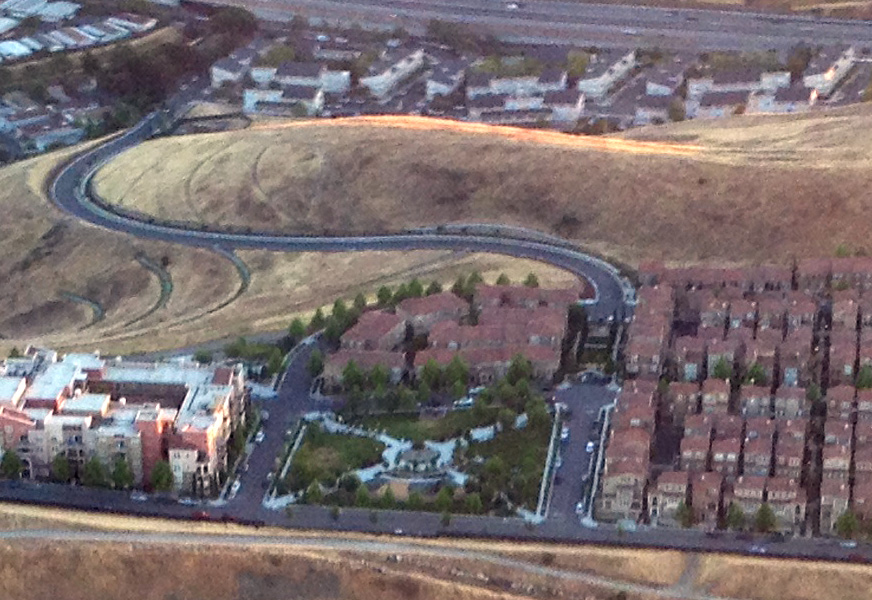
Aerial view of Vieira Park

Vieira Park sits atop Communications Hill.

The park has an outlook of Santa Clara Valley and Santa Cruz Mountains.

== See also ==
- Communications Hill
