= Benjamin Raborg =

American painter

- Born: Benjamin O'Fallan Raborg; 1871; Sulphur Springs, Missouri, United States
- Died: 7 February 1918; San Francisco, California, United States
- Resting place: Oak Hill Memorial Park

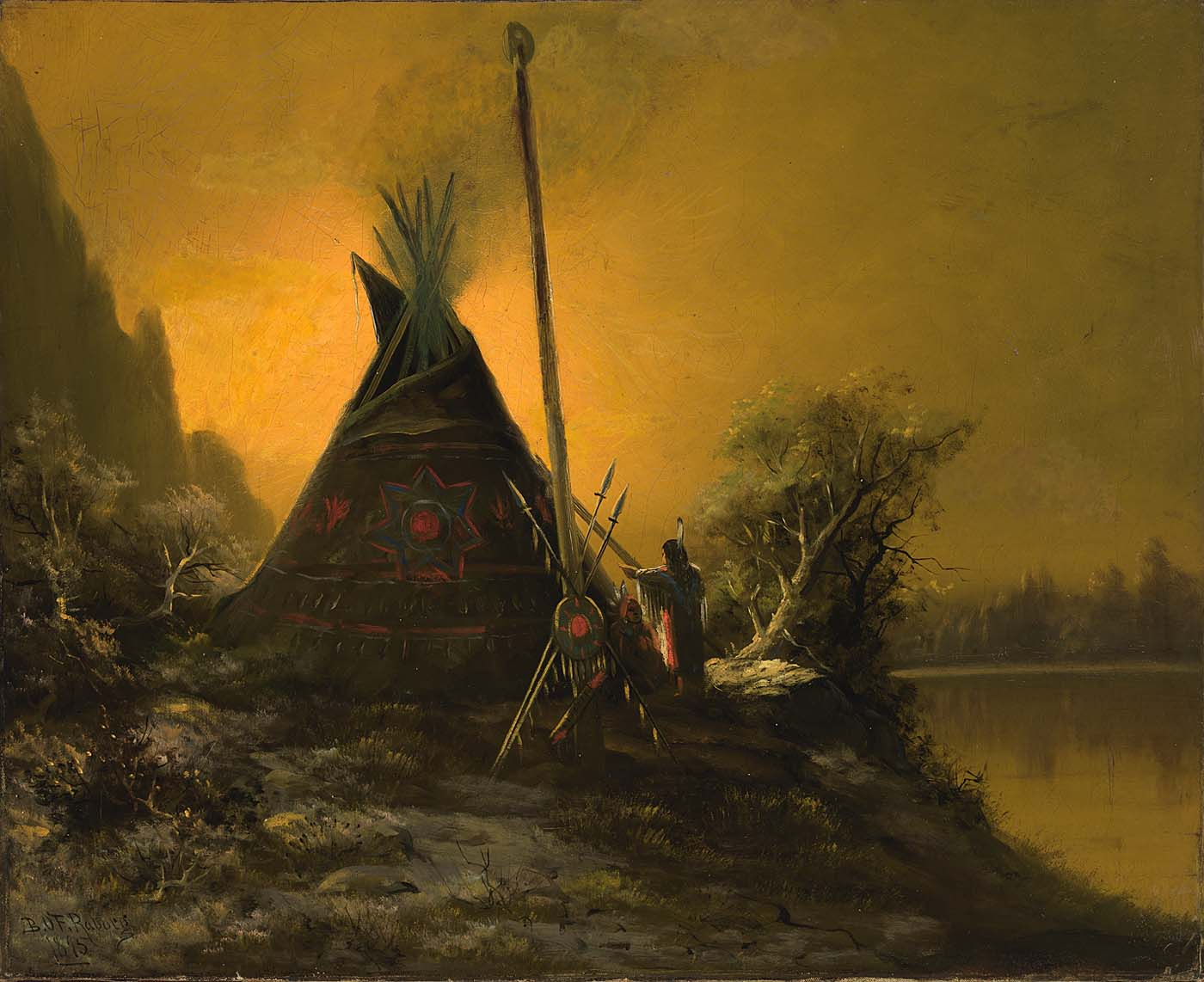

Benjamin O'Fallan Raborg (1871-1918) was an American artist.

Raborg was born in Sulphur Springs, Missouri in 1871. His parents were Franklin Raborg and Sophia Cooper Raborg Simpson. His uncle was artist Astley David Middleton Cooper.

== Career ==
As an artist, Raborg painted Western themes, including landscapes and portraits. American Indians were common subjects in his paintings.

== Later life and legacy ==
He died in San Francisco, California in 1918 after being hit by a cable car. He is buried in Oak Hill Memorial Park in San Jose, California.

== Notable collections ==
- Night Scene of Indian Tipi, oil on canvas, 1918; Smithsonian American Art Museum
