= San Juan Bautista Hills =

Range of hills

- Location within San Jose, California

Highest point
- Elevation: 602 m (1,975 ft)

Naming
- Native name: Colinas de San Juan Bautista (Spanish)

Geography
- Country: United States
- State: California
- Region: Santa Clara Valley
- District: Santa Clara County
- Range coordinates: 37°17′33″N 121°51′47″W

The San Juan Bautista Hills (Spanish: Colinas de San Juan Bautista) are a small, short range of hills in San Jose, California, located in South San Jose in the middle of the Santa Clara Valley.

== Geography ==
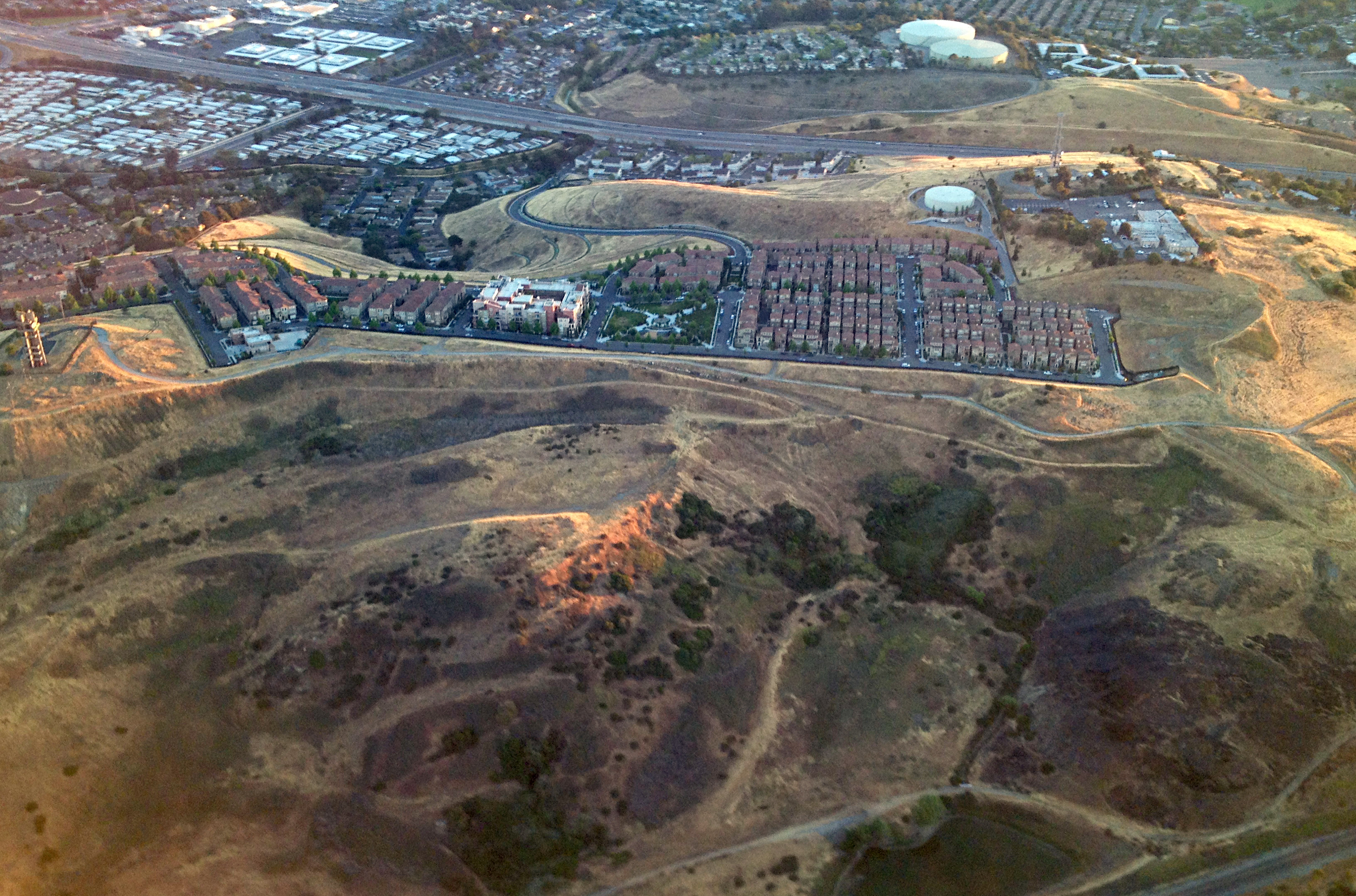
Aerial view of Communications Hill in the southern half of the San Juan Bautista Hills.

The range is made up primarily of two large hills: the larger Communications Hill on the southern side and the smaller Oak Hill on the northern side. Communications Hill is today a dense San Jose city neighborhood, while Oak Hill is home to the Oak Hill Memorial Park. Sunrise Hill is a smaller hill located on Oak Hill; it is home to the Sunrise Hill Cross, a large Christian cross looking over the cemetery.

== History ==
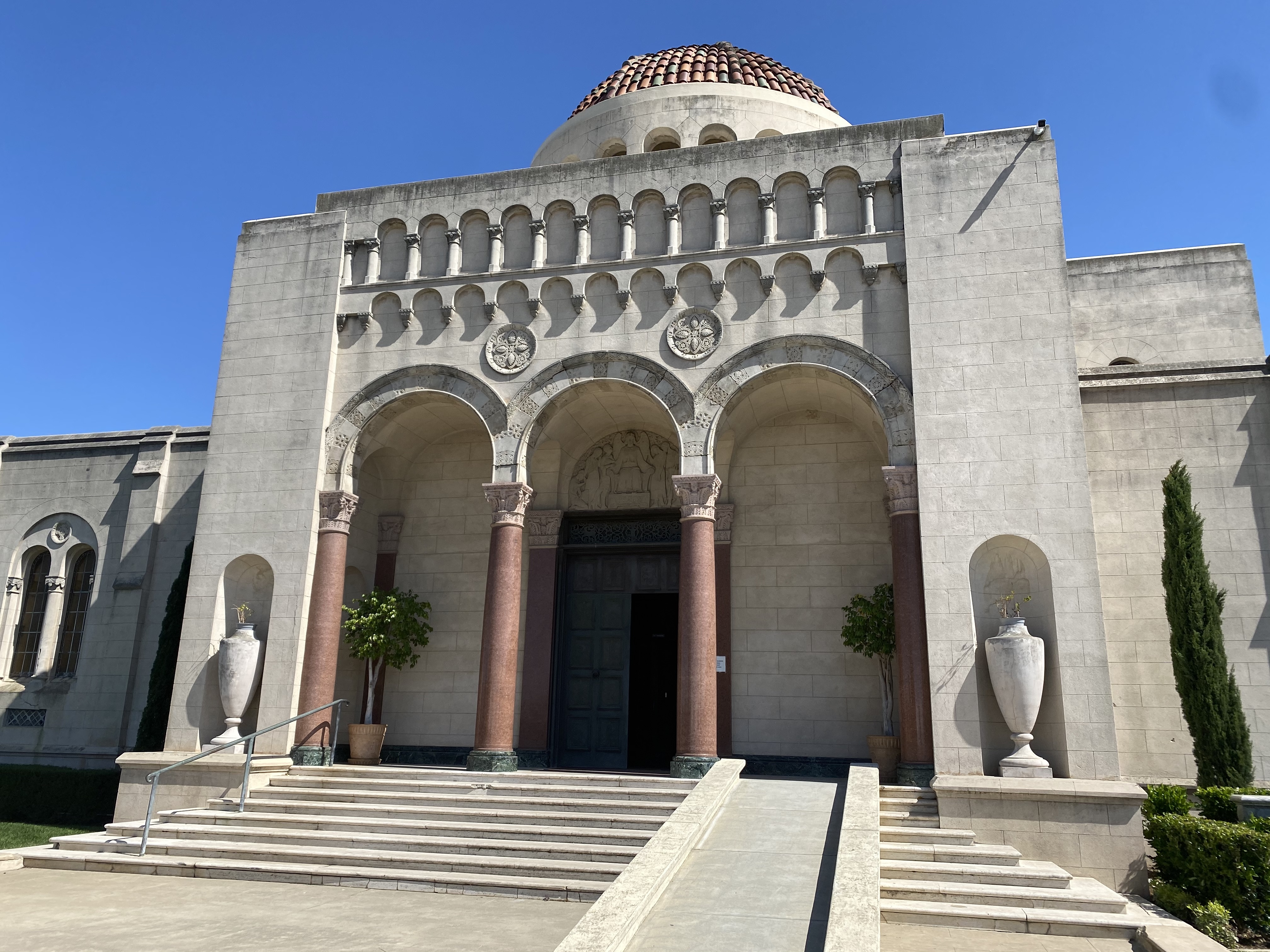
The Great Mausoleum is located atop of Oak Hill.

The first Spanish settlers in the area camped in the hills in 1774, in an expedition led by Captain Fernando Rivera y Moncada, then serving as Governor of the Californias. In 1777, the area was surveyed by the Anza Expedition, led by Juan Bautista de Anza.

As early as 1839, during the Mexican period of California, city officials of the Pueblo de San José de Guadalupe began to bury the dead on the northern side of the San Juan Bautista Hills, which eventually became the site of Oak Hill Memorial Park, the oldest secular cemetery in California.

In 1847, Cinnabar is believed to have been discovered in the Chaboya family. Soon afterwards, the Hillsdale Mine was established. However, operations were unsuccessful and the mine ceased operations in 1907.

Starting in 1984, the Government of San Jose began preparing Communications Hill, then largely barren, for development into a mixed-use, high density, urban neighborhood. This was formalized with the creation of the Communications Hill Specific Plan in 1992.

== See also ==
- Mountain ranges of Santa Clara County, California
