= Glazer =

Glazer is a surname that is derived from the occupation of the glazier, or glass cutter. Some notable people with this name include:

- Avram Glazer (born 1960), American businessman and sports team owner
- Benjamin Glazer (1887–1956), Northern Irish-born American screenwriter, producer, Foley artist, and director
- Bryan Glazer (born 1964), American businessman and sports team owner
- Dan Glazer (born 1996), Israeli footballer
- Elhanan Glazer (born 1947), Israeli politician
- Etty Glazer, South African businesswoman who was kidnapped
- Eugene Glazer (fencer) (born 1939), American Olympic fencer
- Eugene Robert Glazer (born 1942), American actor
- Frank Glazer (1915–2015), American pianist, composer, and professor of music
- Guilford Glazer (1921–2014), American real estate developer
- Ilana Glazer (born 1987), American comedian, writer, and actress
- Jay Glazer (born 1969), American sportswriter
- Joel Glazer (born 1967), American businessman and sports team owner
- Jonathan Glazer (born 1965), English director
- Malcolm Glazer (1928–2014), American businessman and sports team owner
- Nathan Glazer (1923–2019), American commentator
- Omri Glazer (born 1996), Israeli footballer
- Simon Glazer (died 1938), Lithuanian-born American Orthodox rabbi
- Tom Glazer (1914–2003), American folk singer and songwriter
- Yehoshua Glazer (1927–2018), Israeli footballer

== See also ==
- Glaser, surname
- Glazar, surname
- Glaze (surname)
