= Glasner =

Glasner is a surname. Notable people with the surname include:

- Björn Glasner (born 1973), German cyclist
- David Glasner, American economist
- Matthias Glasner (born 1965), German film director
- Moshe Shmuel Glasner (1856–1924), Hungarian Talmudic scholar and rabbi
- Oliver Glasner (born 1974), Austrian footballer and manager
- Sebastian Glasner (born 1985), German footballer

== See also ==
- Glassner, a variant
