= Glaze =

Glaze or glazing may refer to:

- Glaze (metallurgy), a layer of compacted sintered oxide formed on some metals
- Glaze (cooking), a coating of a glossy, often sweet, mixture applied to food
- Glaze (ice), a layer of ice caused by freezing rain
- Glaze (painting technique), a layer of paint, thinned with a medium, so as to become somewhat transparent
- Glaze (surname)
- Glazing (window), a transparent part of a wall
- Ceramic glaze, a vitreous coating to a ceramic material whose primary purposes are decoration or protection
- Glazed (album), a 1993 album by the Canadian rock band Mystery Machine
- Glaze (software), a process to prevent AI interpretation of digital images

== See also ==
- Architectural glass, a building material typically used as transparent glazing material in the building envelope
- Glazing agent, food additives that provide shiny appearance or protective coating to foods
- Insulated glazing, a piece of glazing consisting of two or more layers separated by a spacer
- Glazing used in slang
