= Glaize Creek =

Stream in Jefferson County, Missouri, U.S.

Glaize Creek (also called Grand Glaize Creek) is a stream in Jefferson County in the U.S. state of Missouri. It is a tributary of the Mississippi River. The stream headwaters arise at 38°22′13″N 90°29′37″W just east of Missouri Route 21. The stream flows east-southeast roughly paralleling Missouri Route M and passes under I-55 north of Barnhart then passing under US Route 61 to its confluence with the Mississippi River adjacent to Sulphur Springs at 38°20′3″N 90°22′27″W.

Glaize Creek derives its name from the French words denoting "red earth".

== See also ==
- List of rivers of Missouri
