= Judith E. Glaser =

American author and academic

- Born: June 23, 1946
- Died: November 18, 2018 (aged 72)
- Education: Temple University; Drexel University; Fairfield University
- Occupations: Founder and CEO, Benchmark Communications, Inc.
- Years active: 1981- 2018
- Board member of: Founder and Chairman, Creating WE Institute; We Are Family Foundation; Expeditionary Learning
- Spouse: Richard D. Glaser

Judith E. Glaser (June 23, 1946 – November 18, 2018) was an American author, academic, business executive, and organizational anthropologist. She was the founder and chief executive officer of Benchmark Communications, Inc., an executive coaching and management consulting company based in New York City and Boston. Glaser was also the co-founder and chairman of the Creating WE Institute. During her career, she worked with clients including Clairol, Citibank, Pfizer, Burberry, American Airlines, and Verizon.

Glaser authored seven books, including Creating WE: Change I-Thinking to We-Thinking & Build a Healthy Thriving Organization, The DNA of Leadership, and Conversational Intelligence: How Great Leaders Build Trust and Get Extraordinary Results. She has also had appearances on networks such as CBS and NBC for her commentary on leadership in the workplace.

== Early life and education ==
Glaser became interested in human behavior at a young age, reading medical books by 11 years old and entering college at 16. She earned her bachelor's degree from Temple University and later attended Drexel University, where she was awarded a research fellowship and M.S. in Human Behavior & Development. Glaser also earned a master's degree from Harvard’s Bales School of Social Relations and a second master's in Corporate and Political Communications from Fairfield University. Additionally, Glaser is certified in 20 assessments used for individuals, teams and organizations and she has created four assessments including the C-IQ Assessment; TRUST Assessment, Creating WE DNA Assessment, and WHO AM I? Assessment. In 2006, she was a recipient of the Gallery of Success Award from Temple University.

== Career ==
In 1980, Glaser founded Benchmark Communications, Inc., a workplace transformational consultancy firm that advises businesses on team building and leadership. Initially, the company operated as Judy Glaser & Associates. Glaser's firm was hired by Random House to write the Random House Handbook of Business Terms, a dictionary of over 3,500 industry terms. While writing the business term handbook, Glaser thought the word "benchmarking" stood out and renamed her company Benchmark Communications in 1984. As chief executive officer, Glaser headed Benchmark and worked as an Organizational Anthropologist, consultant, and executive coach for CEO’s and their teams. Her clients have included companies such as Clairol, Champion International Paper, Praxair, Exide, Donna Karan, Pepsi, Citibank, IBM, AT&T and Pfizer.

In 2016 in partnership with Benjamin Croft and WBECS, Glaser launched Conversational Intelligence for Coaches, a 7 module enhanced digital program with full certification. The immersion program was attended by 32,000 professionals over the course of 3 years with a select group of 830 professional coaches going on to complete the prestigious C-IQ Certification.

Additionally, Glaser was a founding member of the Harvard Coaching Institute, a partnership of executive coaches and organizational consultants. She has engaged in decades of research as a social scientist, and focuses her work in the corporate industry as an organizational anthropologist. Glaser was an adjunct professor at Wharton University, and a visiting guest speaker schools including Harvard, Kellogg, Loyola, and the University of Chicago.

Glaser was also co-founder and chairman of the Creating WE Institute, a global research organization focused on the neuroscience of “WE” and organizational leadership. She was also a board member of the We Are Family Foundation as well as Expeditionary Learning. In 2011, she was awarded the Distinguished Alumni Award by Drexel University.

Throughout her career, Glaser studied and researched in various academic fields including human behavior and development, psychology, anthropology, linguistics, neuroscience and transformational social sciences. She authored seven books and was the senior editor of the Random House Handbook of Business Terms.

Glaser died after three years with metastatic pancreatic cancer on November 18, 2018.

== Bibliography ==
- Conversational Intelligence: How Great Leaders Build Trust & Get Extraordinary Results (2013)
- TRUST At the Moment of Contact (2013)
- The Leadership Secret of Gregory Goose (2011)
- Ultimate Power: Gregory Goose, A Journey Over The Horizon (2011)
- 42 Rules for Creating WE: A hands-on, practical approach to organizational development, change and leadership best practices (2009)
- Creating We: Change I-Thinking to We-Thinking and Build a Healthy, Thriving Organization (2007)
- The DNA Of Leadership: Leverage Your Instincts To Communicate, Differentiate, Innovate (2006)
- Conversational Intelligence for Coaches Partnership with WBECS Group (2016–Present)
