= Oak Hill Memorial Park =

Cemetery in San Jose, California, United States

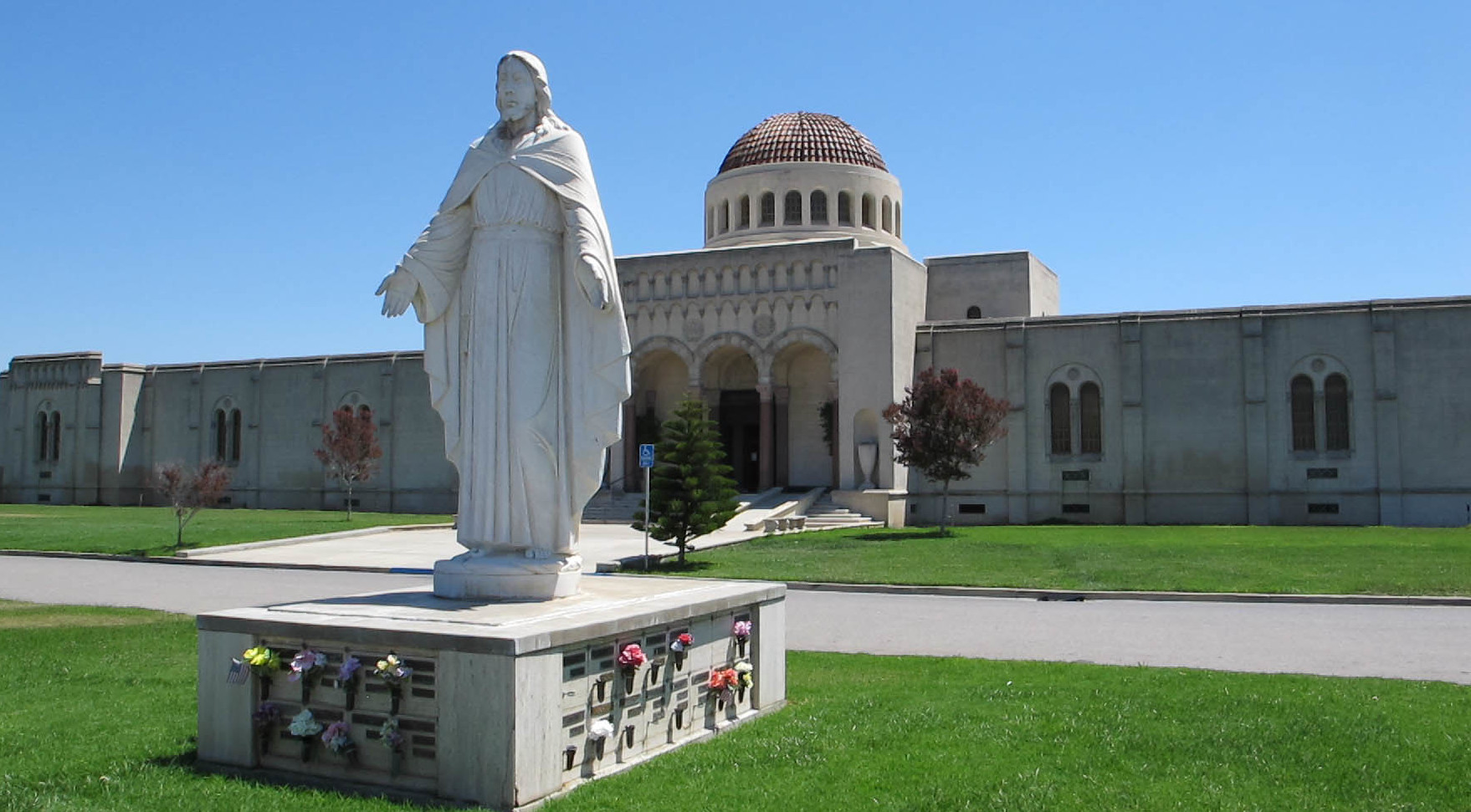
- The Great Mausoleum on top of Oak Hill
- Interactive map of Oak Hill Memorial Park

Details
- Established: 1847
- Location: San Jose, California
- Country: United States
- Coordinates: 37°17′56″N 121°51′37″W
- Owned by: Dignity Memorial
- Size: 300 acres
- No. of interments: >40,000
- Website: Official website
- Find a Grave: Oak Hill Memorial Park

Oak Hill Memorial Park is a cemetery in San Jose, California, United States. Founded in 1847, it is the oldest secular cemetery in California. Oak Hill is the northernmost hill in the San Juan Bautista Hills of South San Jose.

== History ==
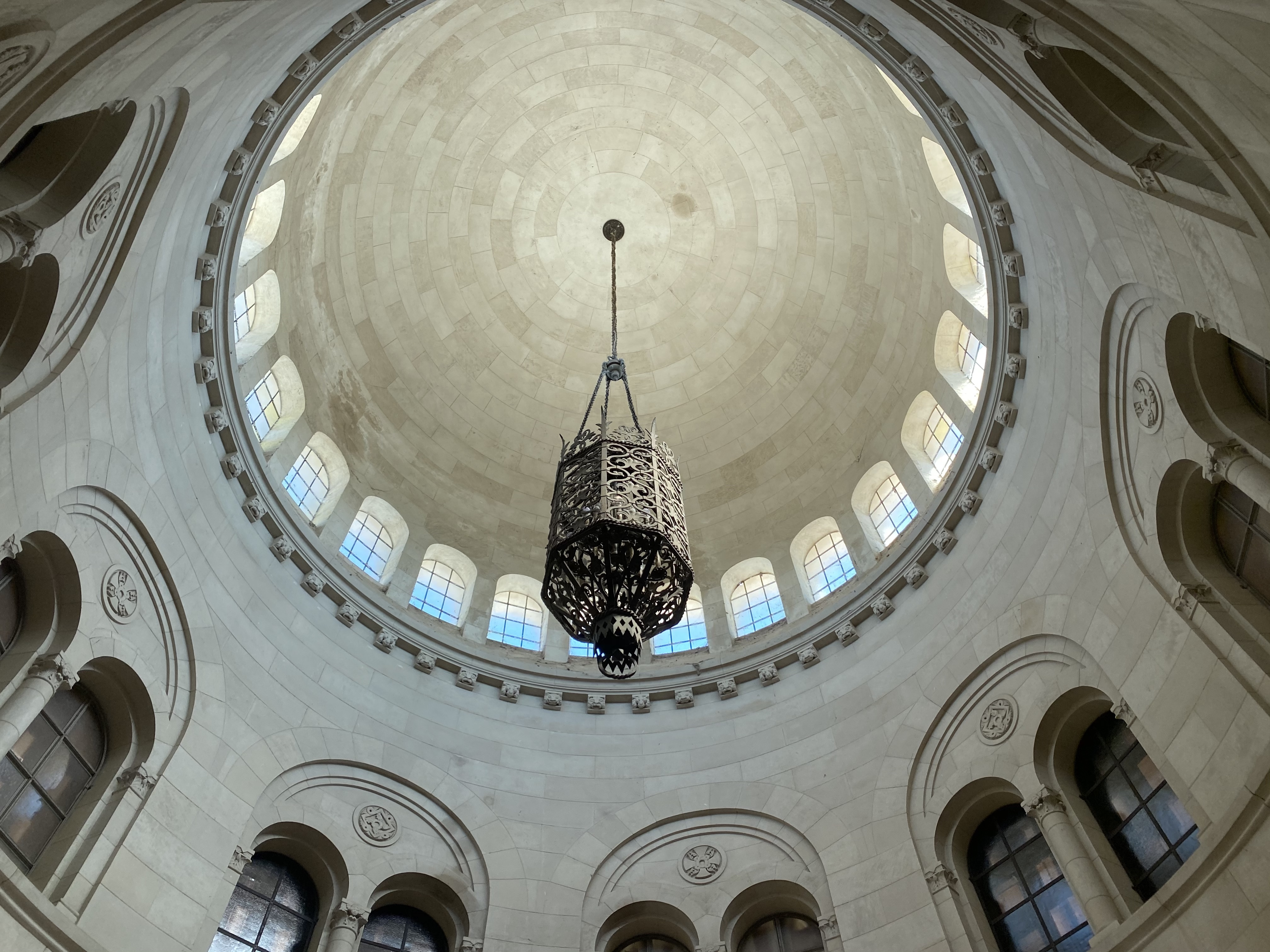
Rotunda of the Great Mausoleum

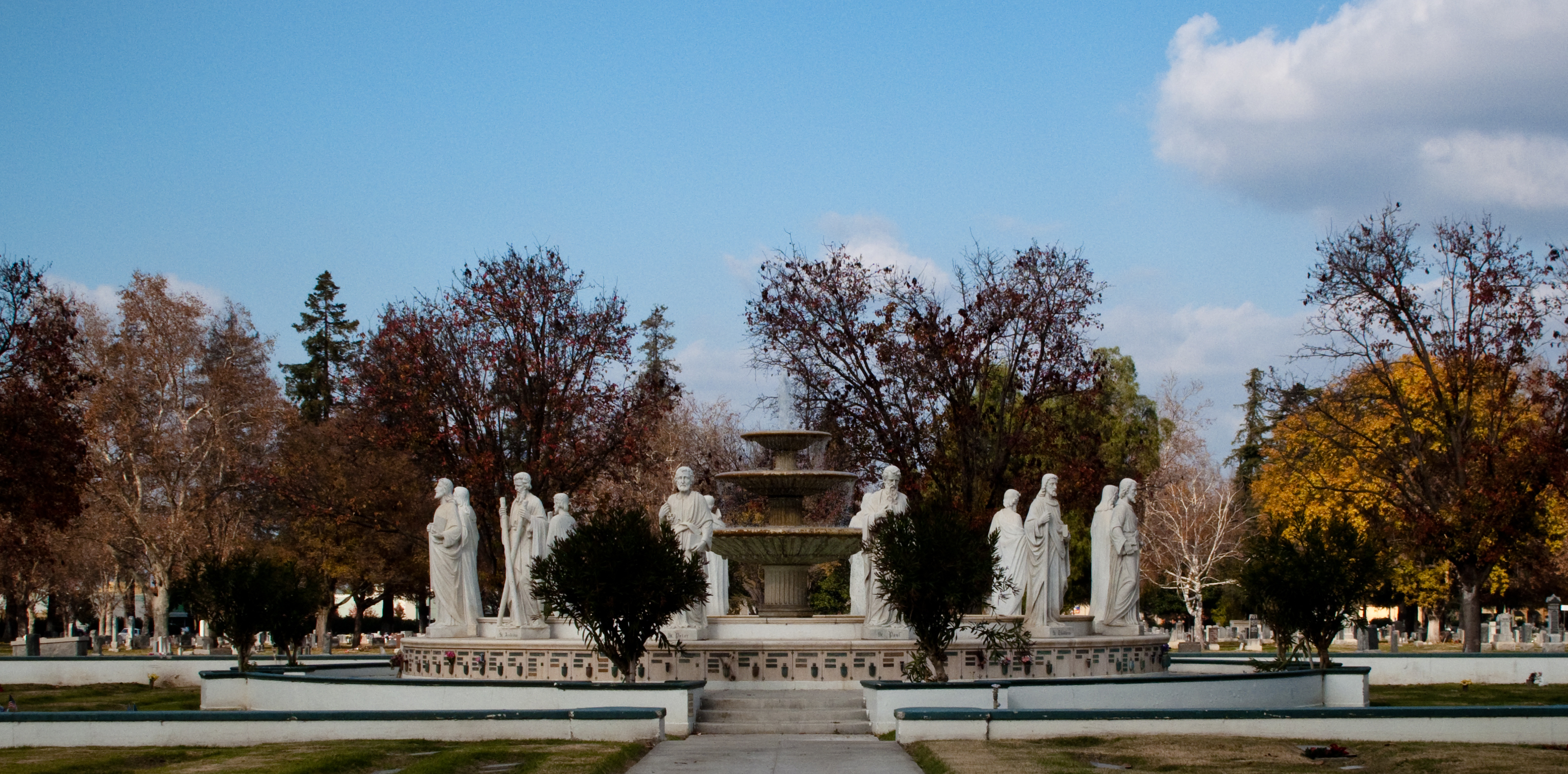
Fountain of the Apostles

The cemetery's origins date back to 1839, during the Mexican period of California, when city officials of the Pueblo de San José de Guadalupe began to bury the dead on the northern side of the San Juan Bautista Hills, in modern-day South San Jose. It was known simply as the Pueblo Graveyard.

In 1847, following the American Conquest of California, surveyor Chester Lyman, along with William Fisher of Rancho Laguna Seca, laid out an official city cemetery on a nearby tract, which was simply known as the Pueblo Cemetery, until it was renamed to Oak Hill Cemetery (Oak Hill being the northernmost hill of the San Juan Bautista Hills where the cemetery is laid out) in 1858.

When the city sold the cemetery to A.J. Hocking in 1933, its name was changed for the final time to Oak Hill Memorial Park. The Hocking family's tenure of ownership of the cemetery was marked by the construction of new mausoleums, notably the Azalea and Parkview Terraces, as well as the construction of the Fountain of the Apostles and the Chapel of the Oaks. In 1986, Oak Hill was finally sold to Dignity Memorial.

== Landmarks ==
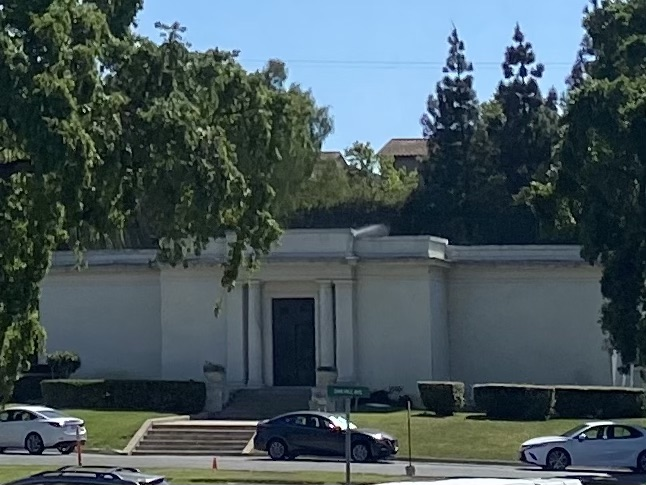
The Community Mausoleum

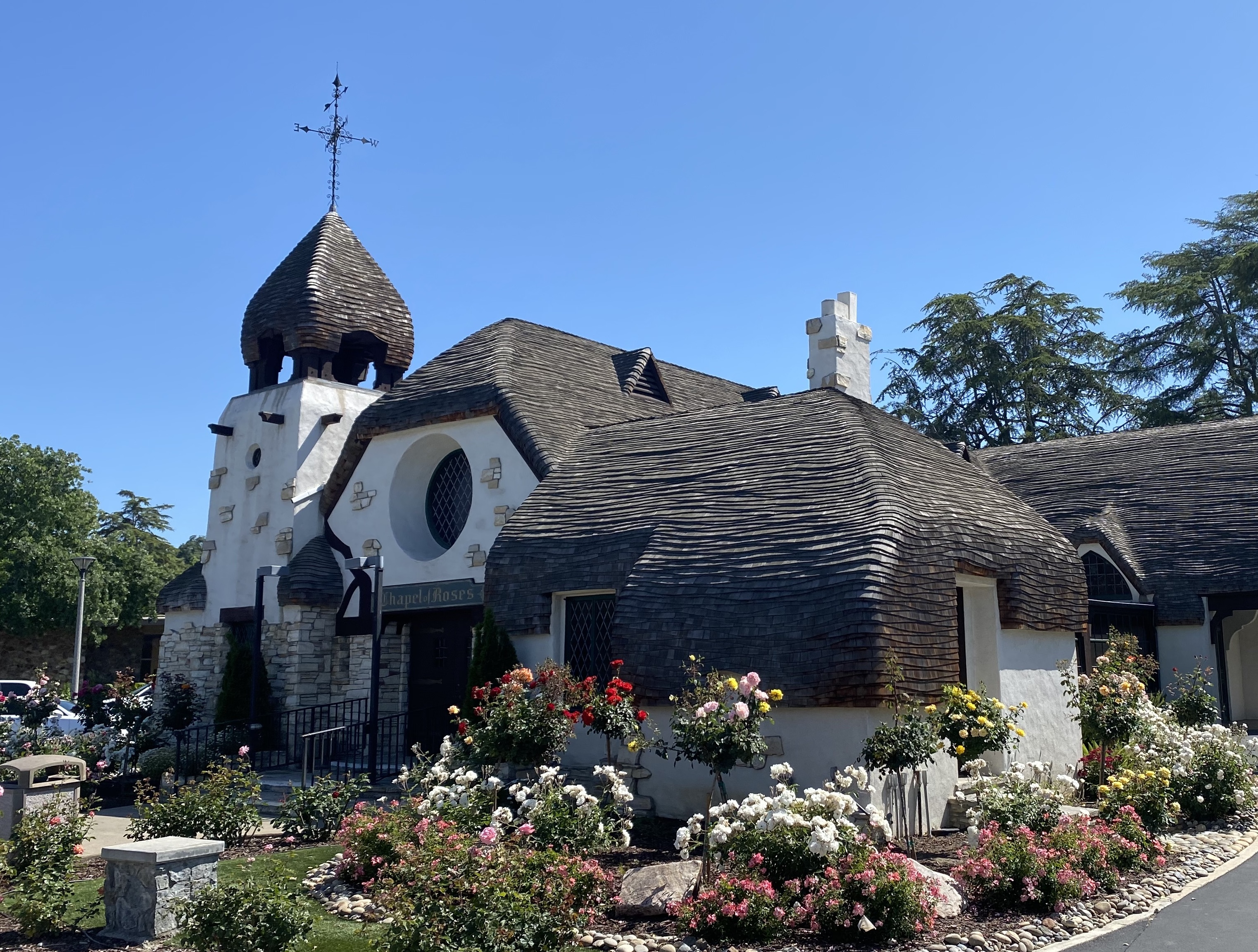
Chapel of Roses

The Great Mausoleum is the most notable landmark at Oak Hill. It built in a historic Romanesque Spanish Revival architecture.

The Sunrise Hill Cross is located atop of Sunrise Hill, the small summit just next to Oak Hill.

The Fountain of the Apostles features twelve marble statues of the Apostles of Christ surrounding the inner font.

The cemetery has an Overland Pioneers Memorial to early American settlers of the Santa Clara Valley.

There is a plot dedicated to members of the Grand Army of the Republic.

== Notable interments ==
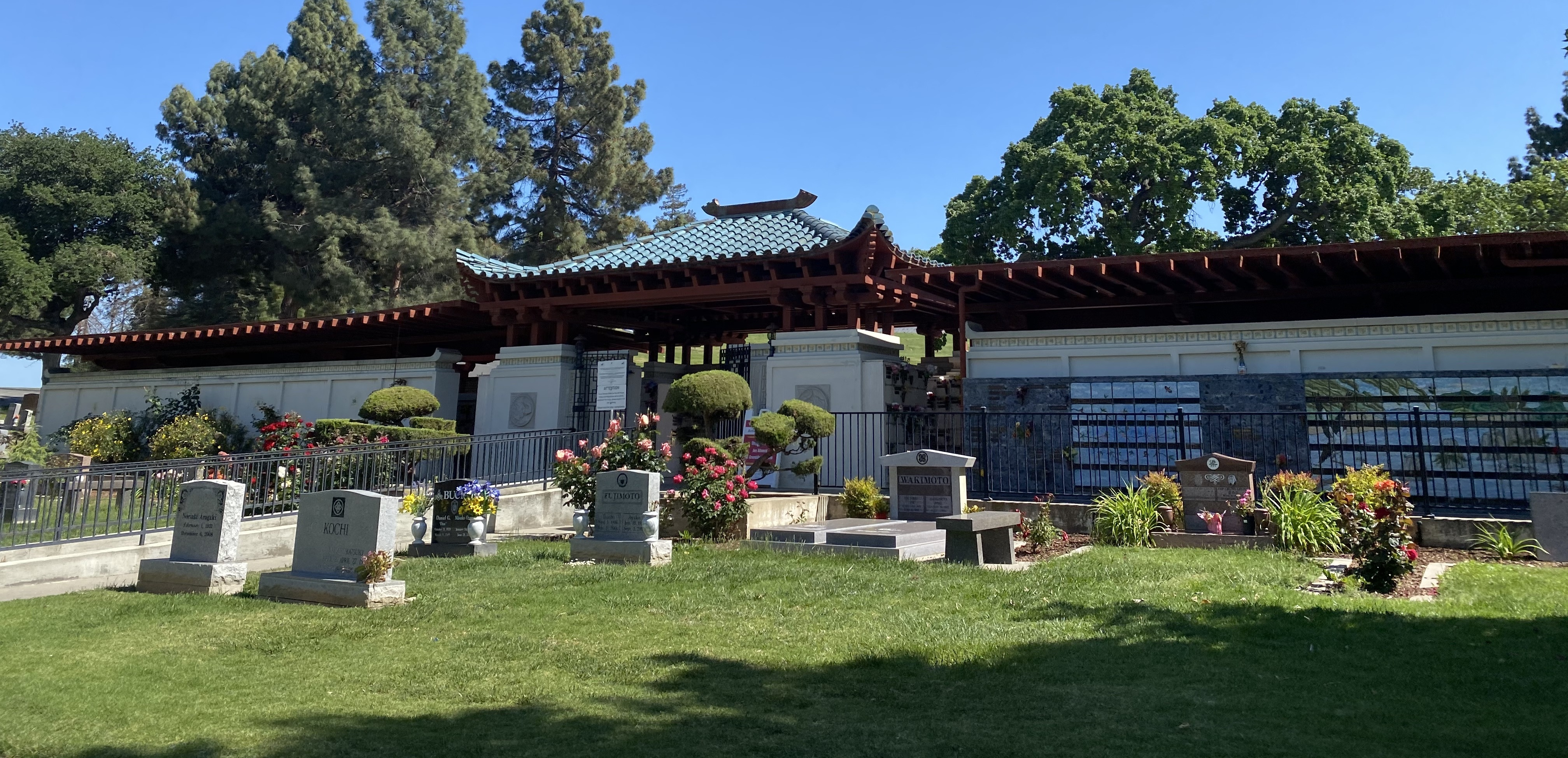
The Japanese Columbarium.

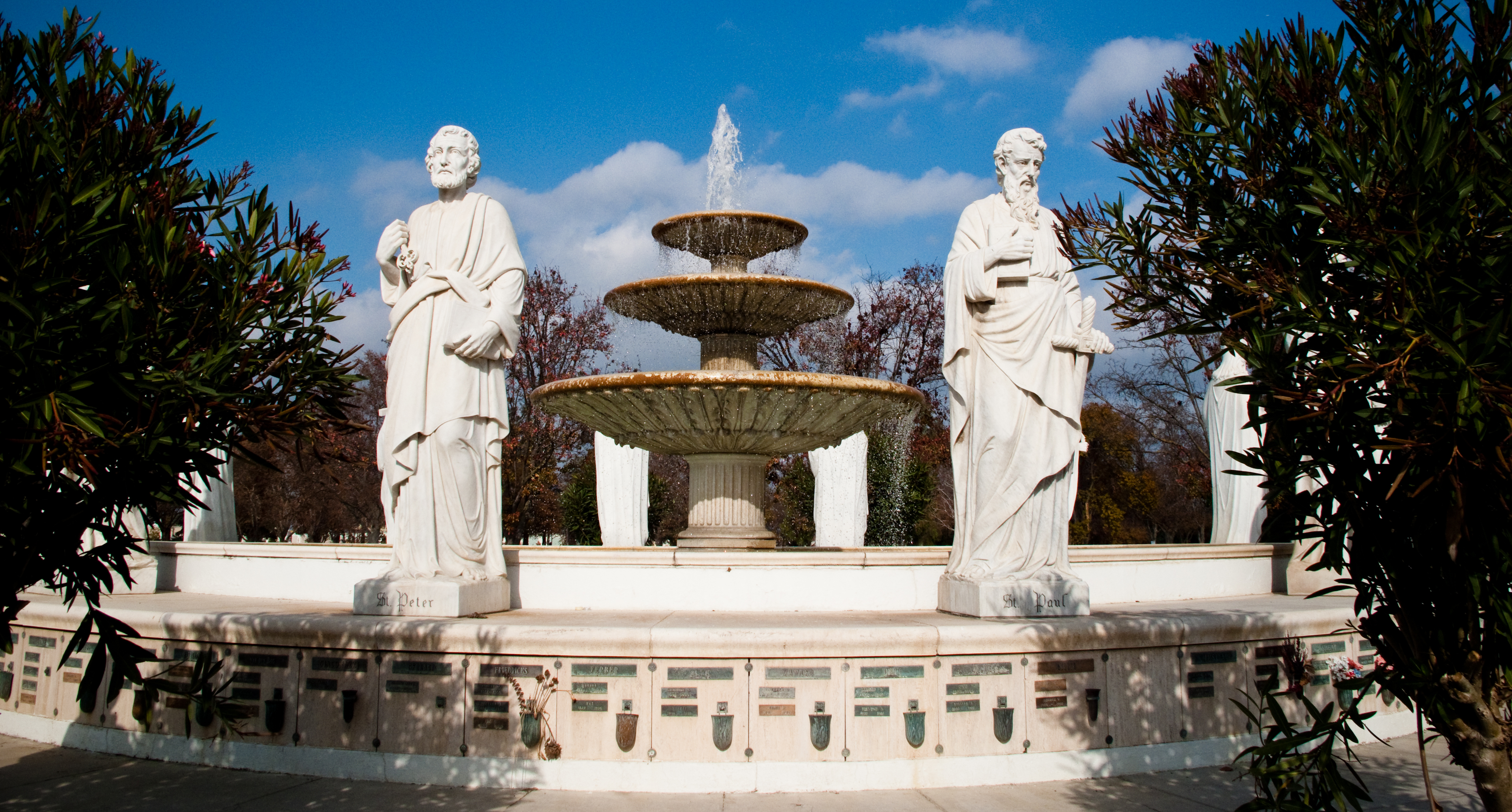
Fountain of the Apostles.

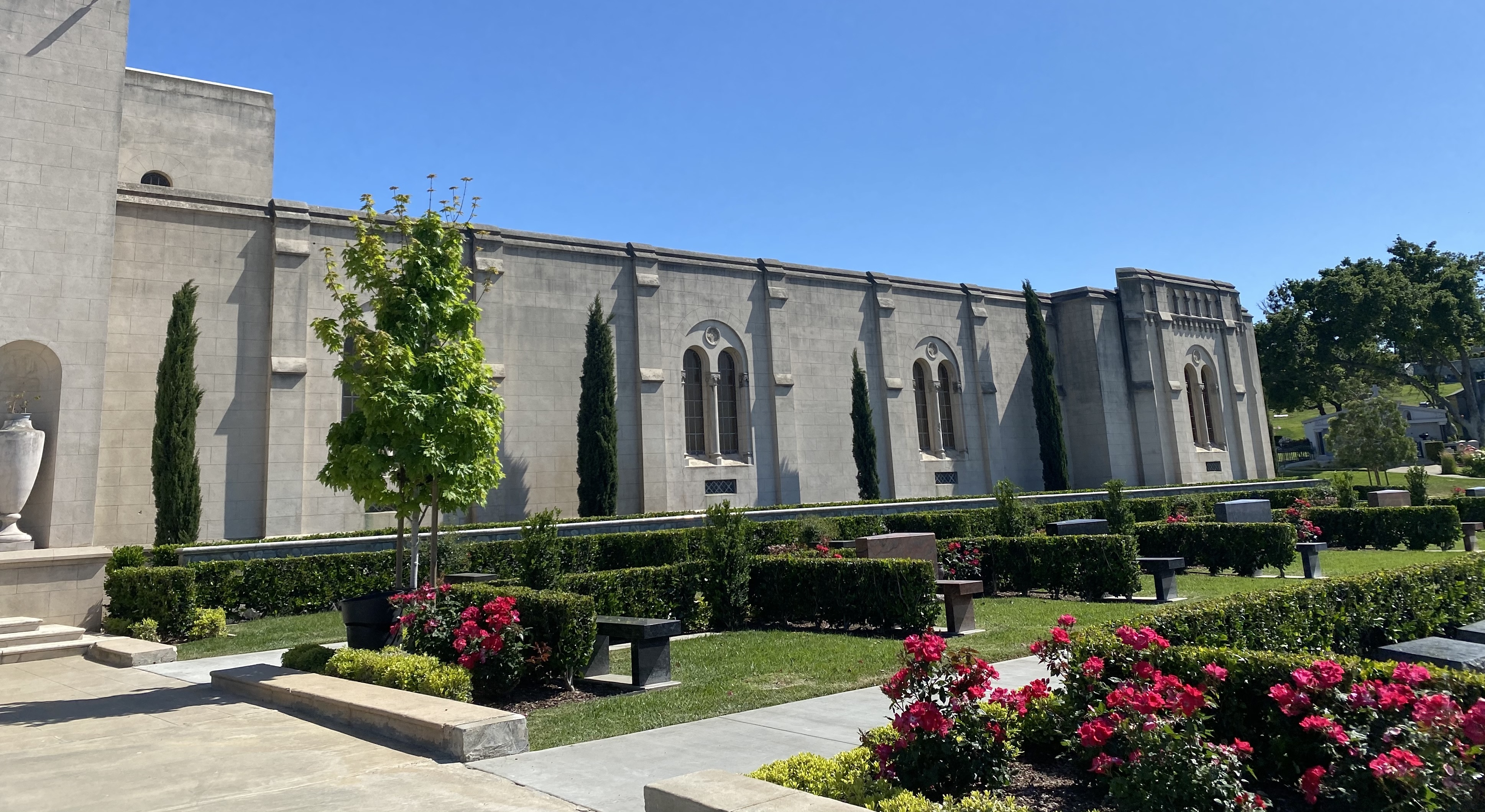
Gardens of the Great Mausoleum.

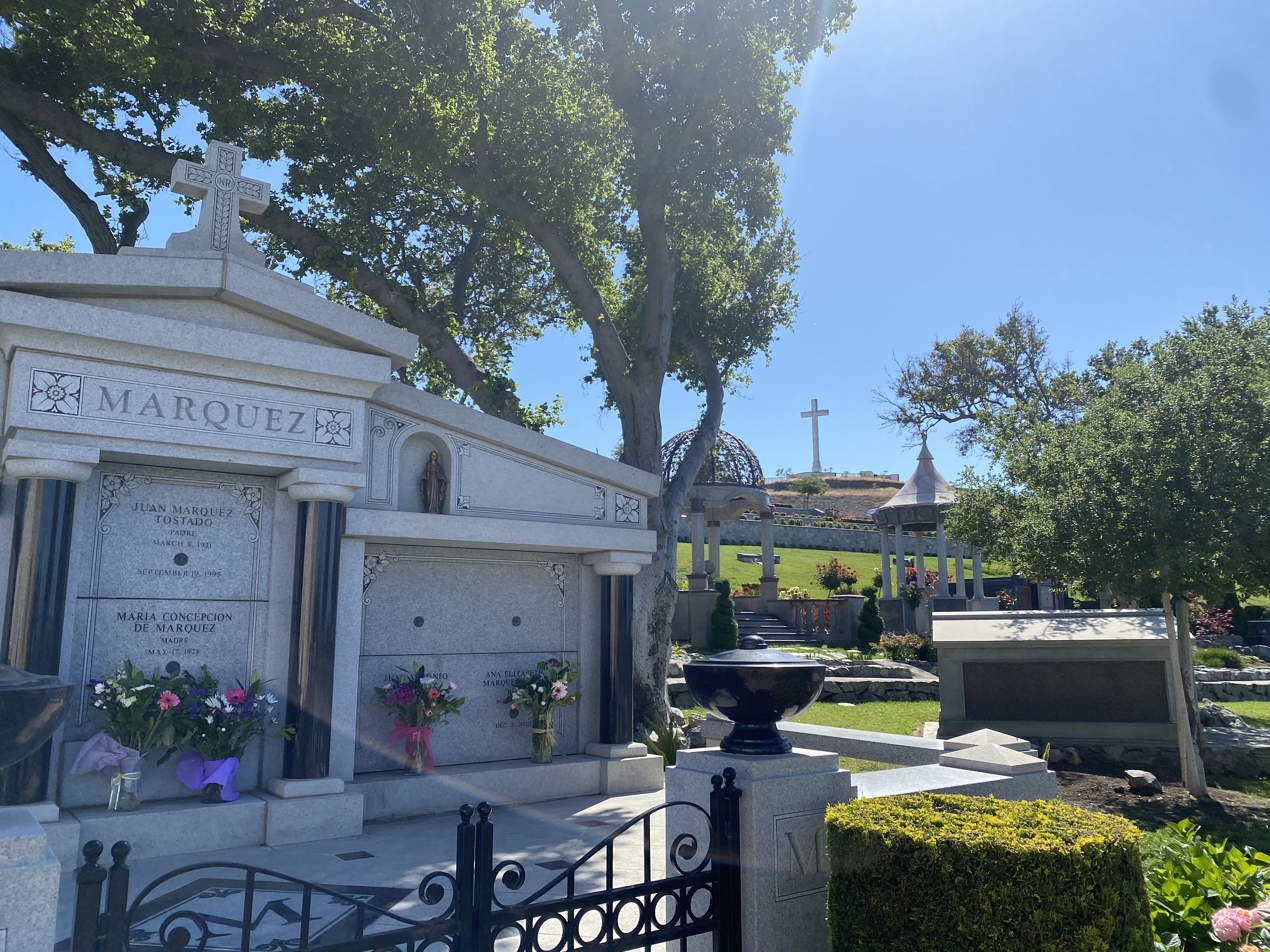
Private mausoleums with the Sunrise Hill Cross in the background

Numerous notable persons are interred at Oak Hill:

- Charles Herman Allen (1828–1904), educator, principal of San Jose State University
- Richard Amory (1927–1981), writer, author of Song of the Loon (1966)
- Frank Arellanes (1882–1918), baseball player
- Lawrence Archer (1820–1910), politician, judge, and lawyer; former Mayor of San Jose
- Esto Bates Broughton (1890–1956), one of the first four women elected to the California State Assembly
- Sylvia Browne (1936–2013), self-proclaimed psychic medium
- Earl Butler, founder of Butler Amusements
- Hal Chase (1883–1947), baseball player
- John Smith Chipman (1800–1869), U.S. Congressman
- Sara J. Dorr (1855–1924), temperance activist
- Bernice C. Downing (1878–1940), the first women in California to publish their own newspaper, the Santa Clara Journal
- Nellie Blessing Eyster (1836–1922), writer and social reformer
- Arthur M. Free (1879–1953), U.S. Congressman
- Elizabeth Eleanor D’Arcy Gaw (1868–1944), artist
- Levi Goodrich (1822–1887), architect
- Brooke Hart (1911–1933), kidnapping and murder victim (son of businessman Alexander Hart)
- Everis Anson Hayes (1855–1942), U.S. Congressman
- Ren Kelly (1899–1963), baseball player
- Sarah Knox-Goodrich (1825–1903), women's rights activist
- Sarah Massey Overton (1850–1914), African-American and women's rights activist
- William Penn Lyon (1822–1913), Chief Justice of the Wisconsin Supreme Court, Civil War General (Union)
- Charles J. Martin (1839–1912) French-born American politician, mayor of San Jose, California, and merchant
- Paul Masson (1859–1940), early California vintner
- Charles Henry McKiernan (1825–1892), early settler in the Santa Cruz Mountains
- John McNaught (1849–1938), early journalist and writer
- Emelie Melville (1852–1932), American actress
- Norman Mineta (1931–2022), United States Secretary of Transportation
- John Marion Murphy (1824–1892) Canadian-born American politician, businessman, settler in California
- José Noriega (1796–1869), Alcalde of San José
- Benjamin Raborg (1871–1918), American artist
- James F. Reed (1800–1874), organizing member of the Donner Party
- Lester Reiff (1877–1948), jockey
- Fred Sanborn (1899–1961), Vaudeville performer
- Samuel Morgan Shortridge (1861–1952), U.S. Senator
- Eugene T. Sawyer (1846–1924), newspaper editor and writer of the Nick Carter detective series
- Edward O. Smith (1817–1892), Mayor of Decatur, Illinois, Illinois State Senator, and California pioneer
- John Townsend (?–1850), early Alcalde of San Francisco
- Gus Triandos (1930–2013), baseball player
- Edward Alexander Walker (1864–1946), Medal of Honor recipient for service in the Boxer Rebellion
- Carrie Stevens Walter (1846–1907), poet and co-founder of the Sempervirens Club
- Byron Daniel Bernstein (1989–2020), professional World of Warcraft player, Twitch Streamer

== Gallery ==
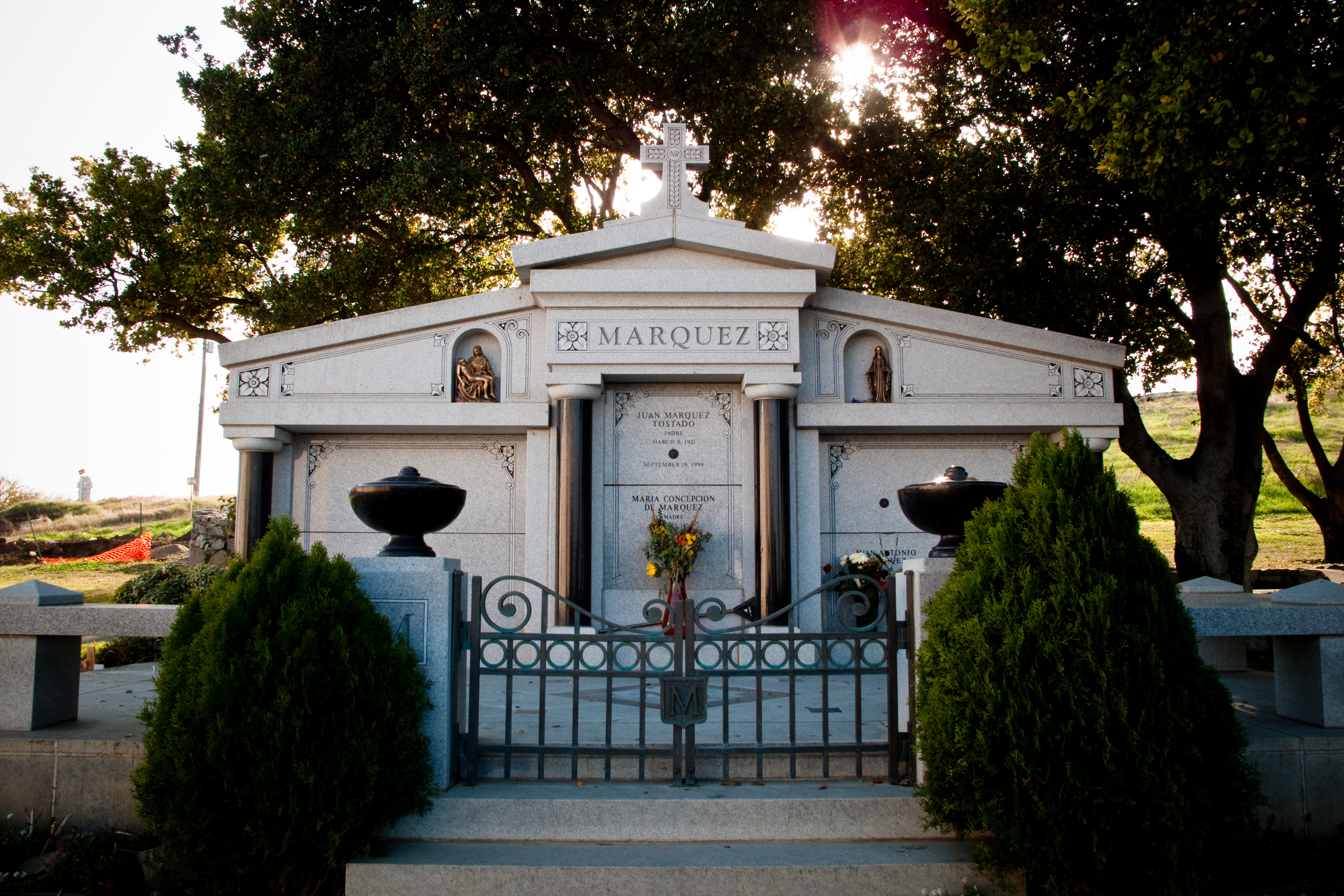
Márquez mausoleum

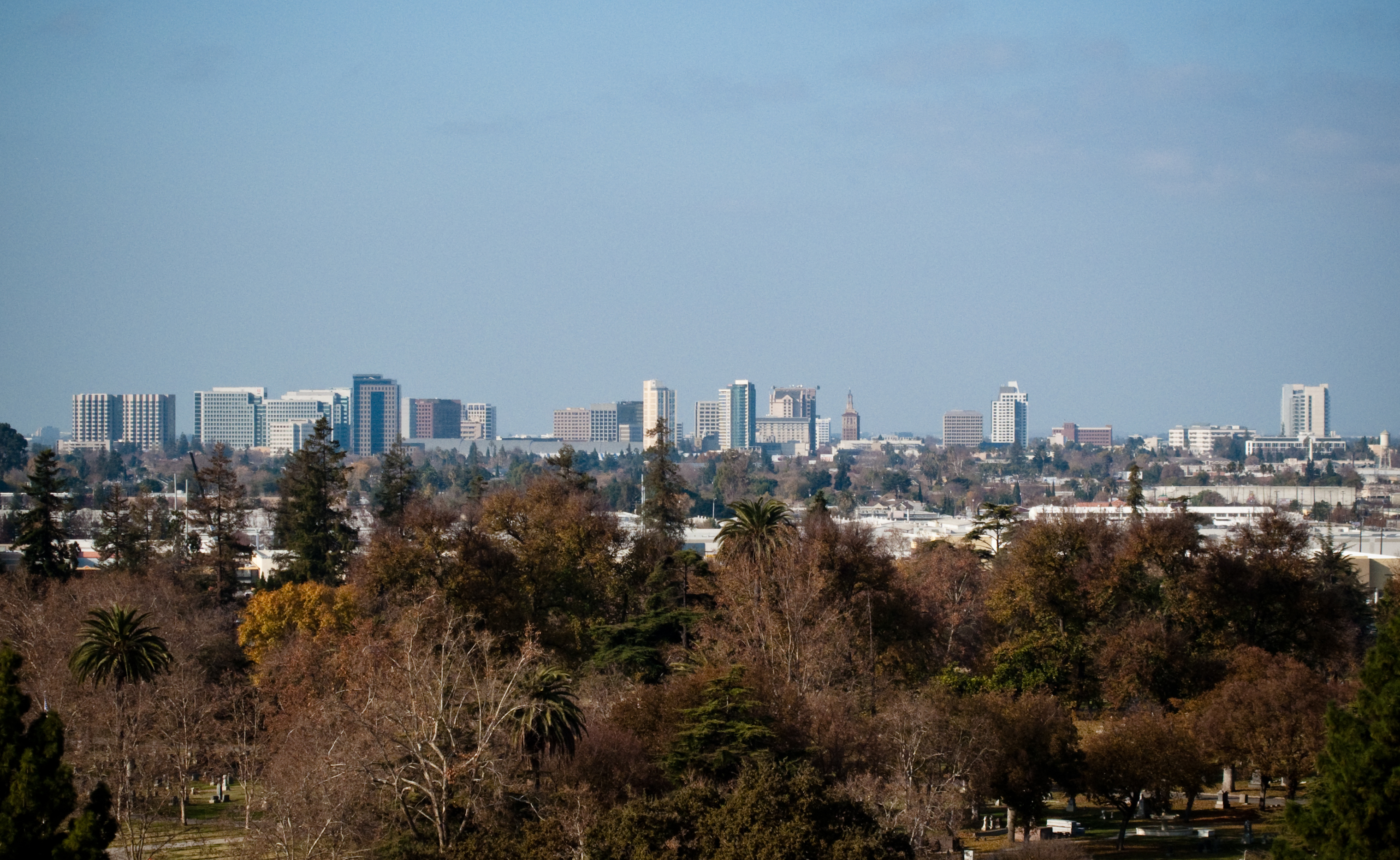
View of Downtown San Jose from Oak Hill

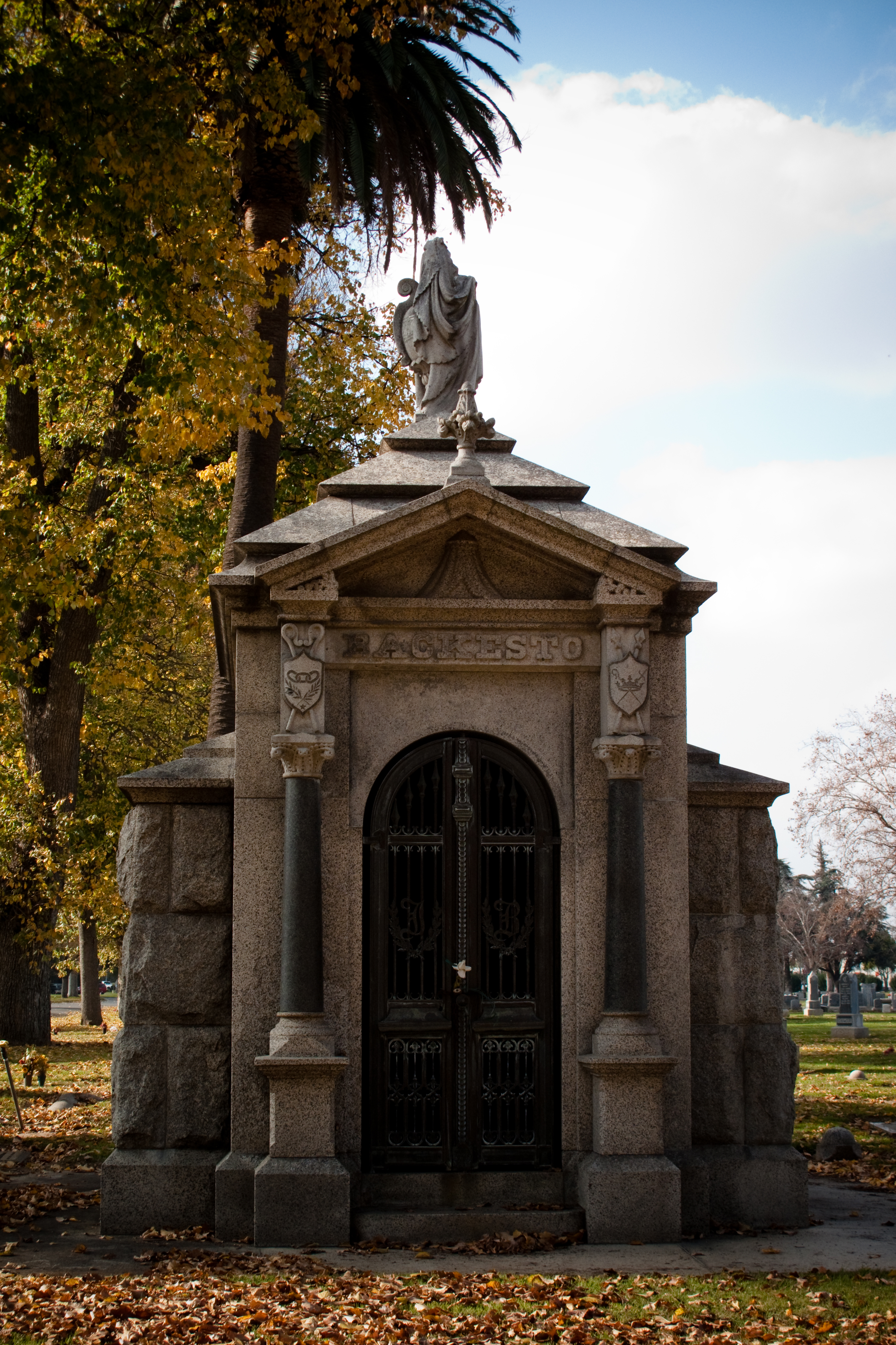
Backesto mausoleum

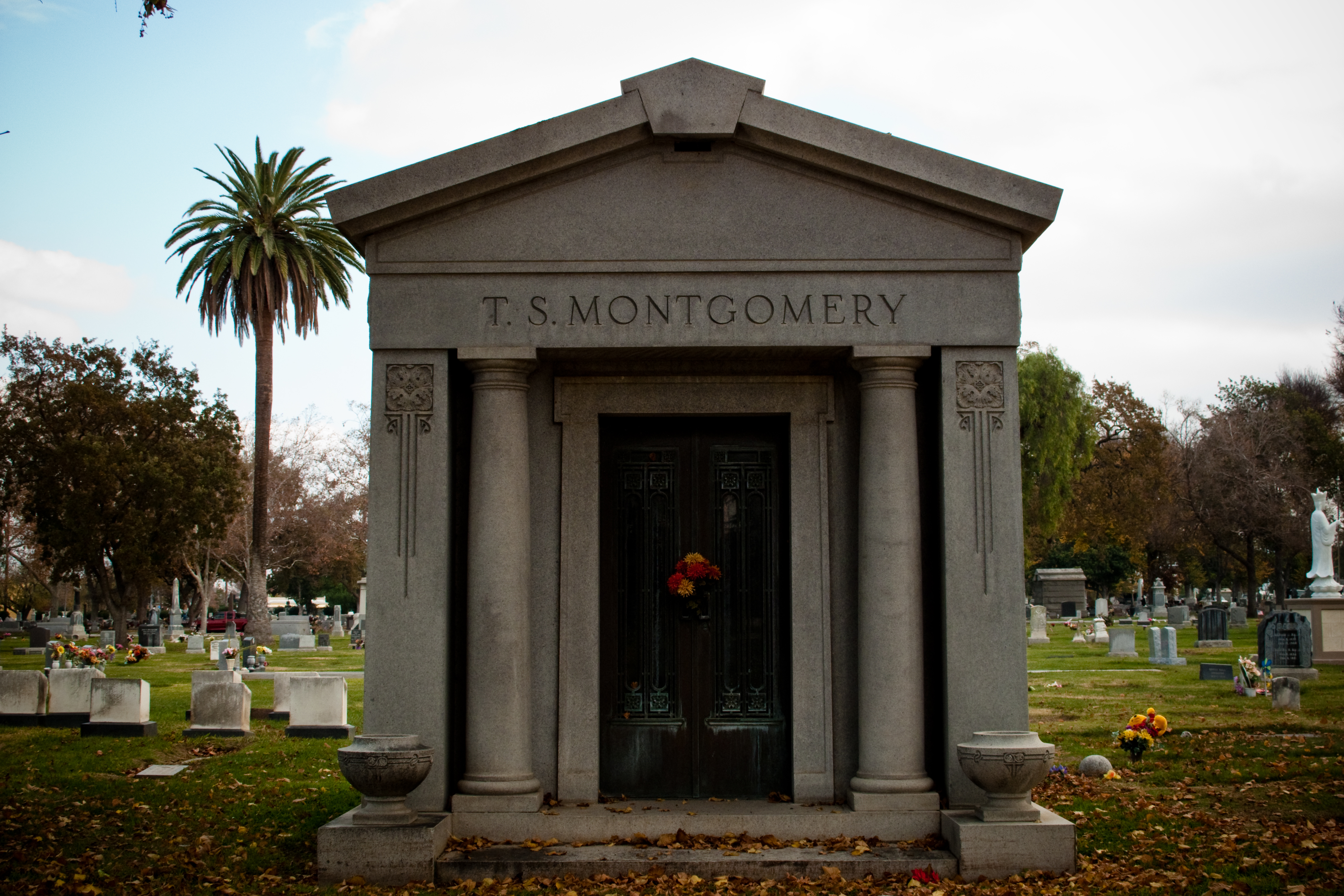

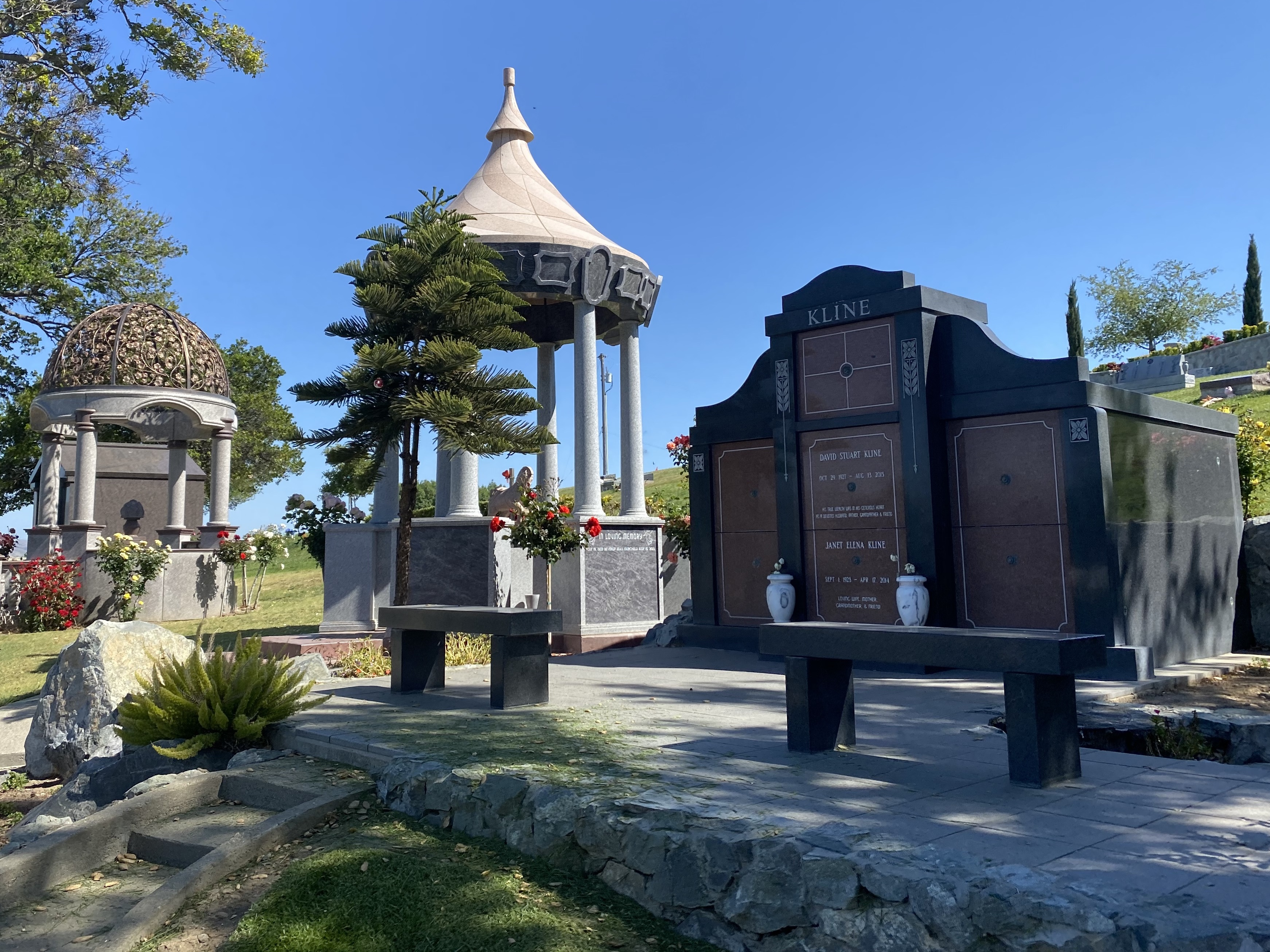
Private mausoleums

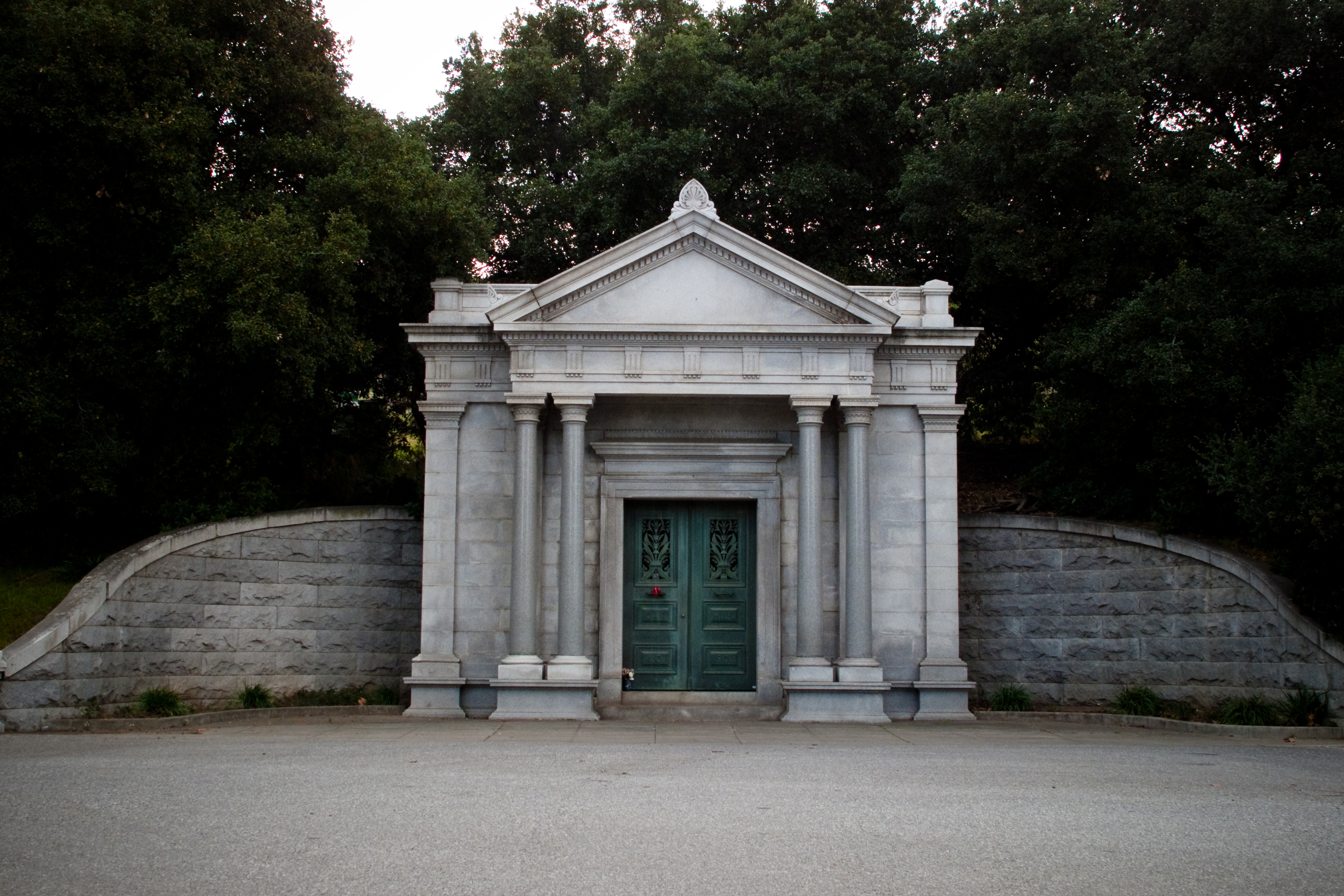
The Hillside Mausoleum

== See also ==
- List of cemeteries in California
