= Emmanuel Glaser =

French lawyer, and juriste (born 1964)

Emmanuel Glaser (born 31 May 1964) is a French Lawyer, and juriste, specialised in Public law.

After two year of Khâgne at Lycée Henri-IV in Paris, he was admitted at the 'École normale supérieure in 1983, getting a master's degree in history. He studied at Sciences Po Paris in the Public service section. In 1992, he joined the École nationale d'administration opting for the Conseil d'État. He holds a diploma from the INALCO where he studied Arabic from 1986 to 1988. He was admitted to the barreau de Paris in 2011.
