= Orson Welles Paul Masson advertisements =

Wine advertisements

Orson Welles acted in a series of advertisements for Paul Masson's California wine from 1978 to 1981, best known for their slogan "We will sell no wine before its time," becoming a much-parodied cultural trope of the late 20th century. Years later, the commercials regained notoriety when a bootleg recording of out-takes was distributed, showing a possible inebriated Welles on the set of one of the commercials.

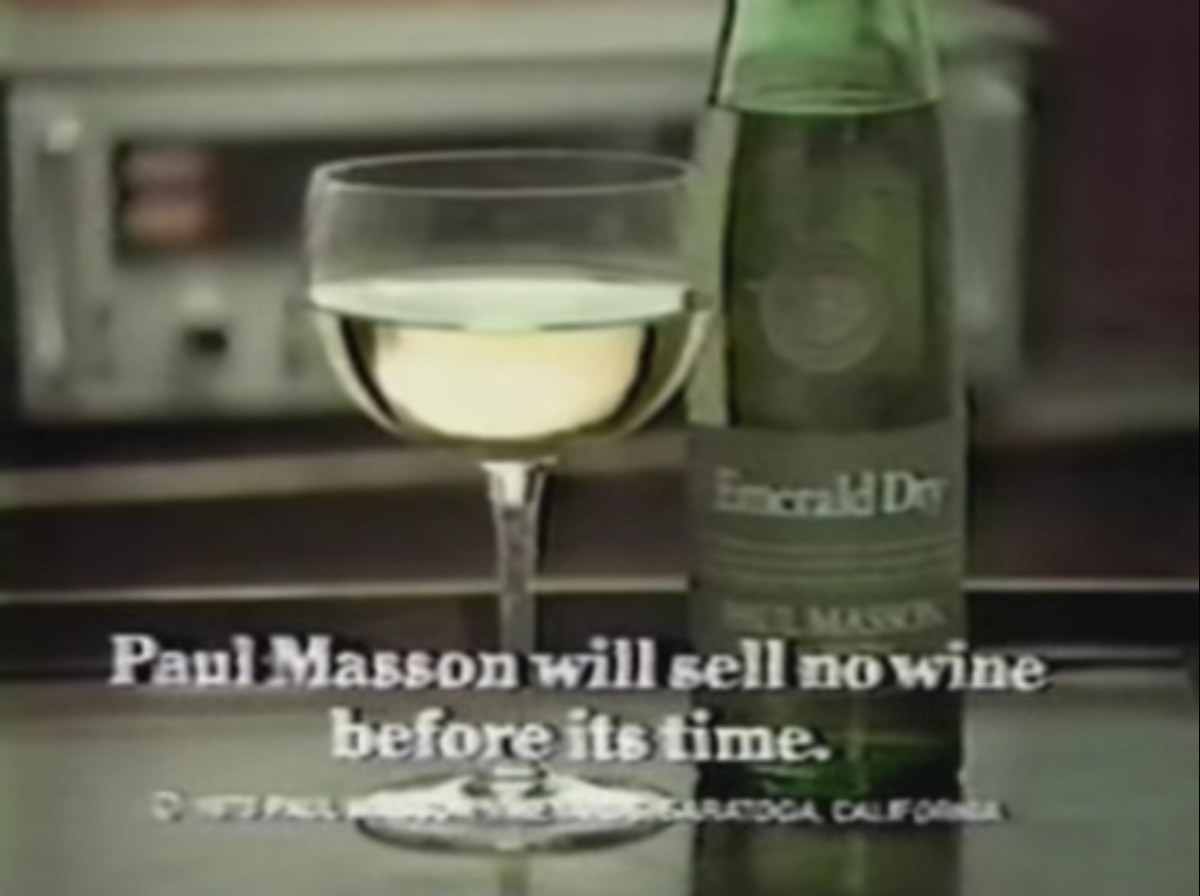
The campaign's slogan became a popular cultural trope of the late 1970s.

== Background ==
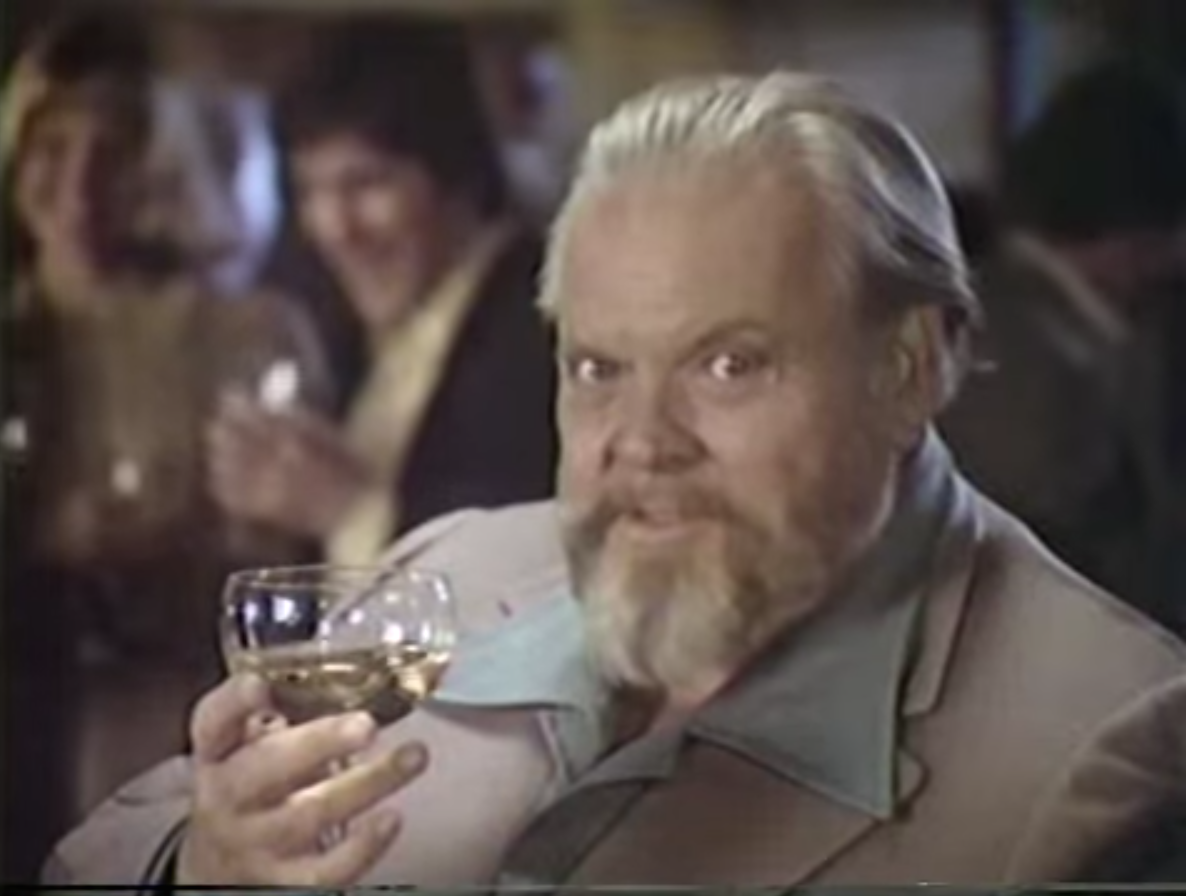
Orson Welles presented a series of distinctive ads for Paul Masson.

In 1978, Paul Masson's California wines hired actor-director Orson Welles to make a commercial for their "Emerald Dry" white table wine. Although Paul Masson's winery had been producing California wines since 1892, they had long catered to the lower end of the wine market. The commercial was part of an effort to rebrand as a higher-end wine producer, tying in with a period of diversification, when they were seeking to expand from the sparkling wines which had first brought them success, and to sell more of their other wine ranges, including chablis, burgundy, riesling, chardonnay, Cabernet Sauvignon, port and sherry. As The New York Times noted in 1990, Paul Masson's long-term problem remained the same: "While many consumers know them—who can forget Orson Welles's breathy incantation of 'We will sell no wine before its time' for Masson—they lack cachet."

After the success of the commercial, Welles was signed to a Paul Masson contract worth $500,000 a year ($2.47 million in 2025) plus residuals, making further ads for the brand on television and in print, which continued for three years until his sacking by the company in 1981. Despite Welles's poor behavior on set, Paul Masson was described as "a very happy client", with sales of their wine reportedly rising by 30% during the Welles advertising campaign.

By this stage in his career, Welles found it nearly impossible to obtain work as a director (his last directorial credit to be released in his lifetime was a television movie in West Germany, which aired in 1978). From the mid-1970s onwards, his only acting credits were cameo appearances, mostly low-budget. He was heavily dependent for his income on ads for products of variable quality. These included Carlsberg beer, Domecq sherry, Sandeman's port (playing the "Sandeman Don" in a TV advertisement), Jim Beam bourbon whisky, Nikka Japanese G&G whisky, Perrier mineral water, Nashua photocopiers, Vivitar instant cameras, Preview pay-per-view television, the board game Dark Tower, Eastern Air Lines, Texaco, Post's Shredded Wheat, Hayden Flour Mills, Lone Star Cement, Walt Disney World, Uniroyal tyres, and Findus frozen foods. Although Welles had made ads for his entire career, beginning when he was a well known radio actor in the 1930s, by the late 1970s these had become his staple, and he was often anonymously directing them as well. John Annarino, the advertising executive handling the Paul Masson account at the time, remembered that Welles "was eager for almost any kind of work in the early 1980s, hoping to complete a film that was languishing in some European vault (The Other Side of the Wind)." Welles was often dismissive of the work, pointing out that he tended to be hired "to give a little class" to such productions.

Offscreen, Welles was dismissive about the Paul Masson commercials' claims to high culture. When asked during shooting to liken a Paul Masson wine to a violin by Stradivarius, he complained, "Come on, gentlemen, now really! You have a nice, pleasant little cheap wine here. You haven't gotten the presumption to compare it to a Stradivarius violin. It's odious." Welles was not alone in mocking the pretensions of the adverts—even crew members on the set would spout spoofs such as, "We will sell the swine no more wine until it's brine!"

== Tensions between Welles and DDB Needham ==
The advertising campaign was marked by animosity between Welles and the advertising agency which commissioned the ads, DDB Needham. Welles once complained to his regular lunching companion, the director Henry Jaglom, "I have never seen more seedier, about-to-be-fired sad sacks than were responsible for those Paul Masson ads. The agency hated me because I kept trying to improve their copy." The DDB Needham executive who handled the Paul Masson account, John Annarino, responded to the 2013 publication of Welles transcripts describing the commercials by sharing his own reminiscences with his local paper, The Desert Sun, and recalling of the experience, "It was no picnic." This acrimony was underlined by the assistant director, Peter Shillingford, who recalled:

[I] made sure none of the crew, the extras or people from the agency were coming up to Orson. The agency was particularly an issue, because they used to all want to chat with him, especially because he was always changing their dialogue. I never saw an outburst from him, but there were confrontations between him and the agency, even though he always changed their dialogue for the better. They kept approaching him, though, and I had to tell the agency, "No! He's not going to deal with all of you. Select a spokesperson and that person will tell me or the director, but it can't be all of you at once!" Orson loved how I handled them.

Shillingford notes that during the infamous drunken outtake, "The agency men were furious. They were talking about suing him, talking about firing him. They hated him anyway." However, he went on to describe how the adverts usually proceeded:

Normally, the shoots went great. We'd film them at various mansions in Hollywood. We'd get ready, and Orson's double-sized piano stool would be put front-and-center. He would arrive on time in a limo, I'd greet him and he'd remove his cloak and his hat and a makeup girl would dust him down. He'd have a seat and a dozen well-dressed extras would file into the room with all eyes on Orson. The glasses would be filled, then I'd walk in with the clapper and Orson would do a take. Inevitably, the agency guys would crowd around the camera and get in Orson's eyeline. He hated them, so he'd shoo them away but they normally didn't listen until I'd move them further back. We'd get a few more takes like that, and that would be it.

== Crew ==
- Producer: John Annarino
- Director: Jim Hallowes
- Production Supervisor, assistant director and Clapperboard Assistant: Peter Shillingford (first five adverts only)
- Cinematographer: Mike Chevalier
- First assistant camera: Randall Robinson

== Ad synopses ==
=== 1978: Original ad—Beethoven, Emerald Dry ===
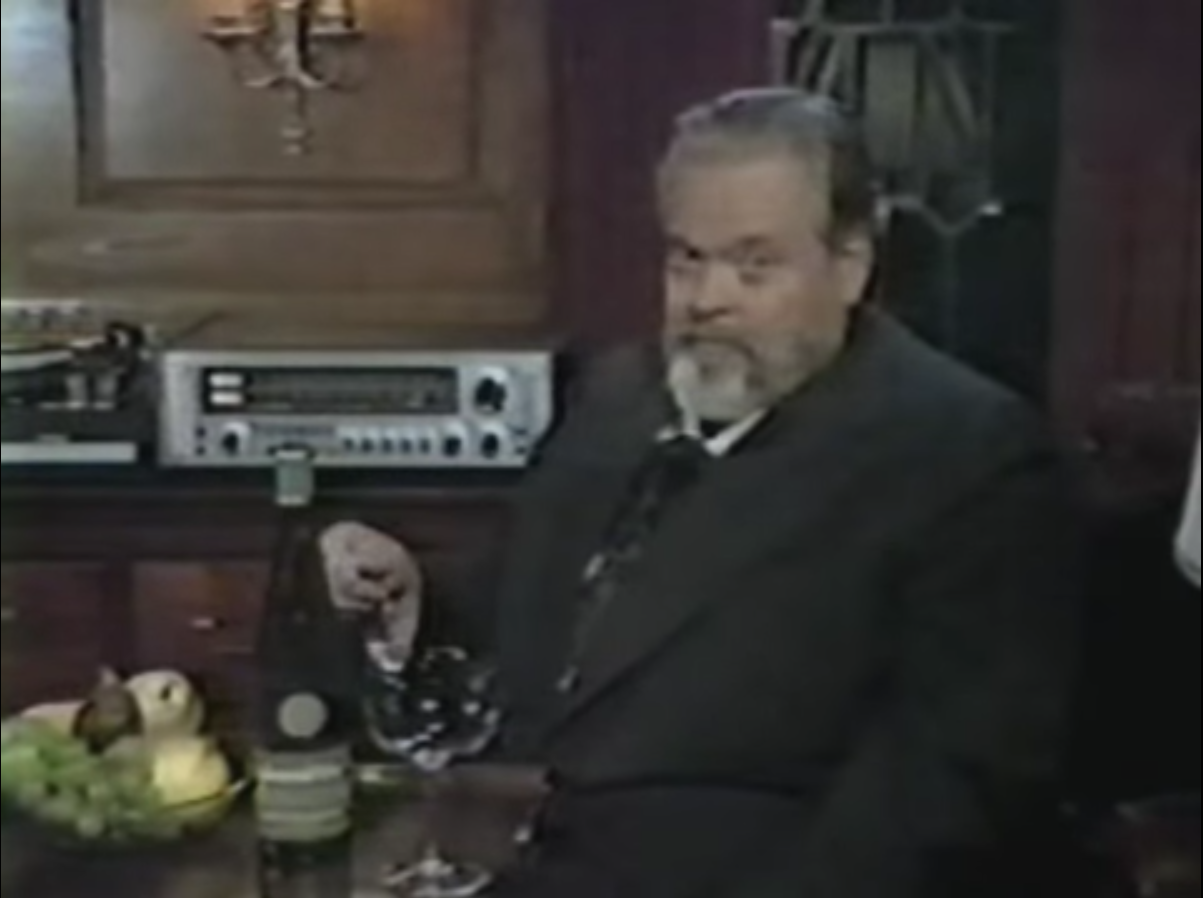
Beethoven

The first Paul Masson ad had Welles listening to the opening of Beethoven's Symphony No. 5 on a record player and remarking:

It took Beethoven four years to write that symphony. Some things can't be rushed: good music, and good wine. Paul Masson's Emerald Dry, a delicious white wine. Paul Masson's wines taste so good because they're made with such care. What Paul Masson himself said nearly a century ago is still true today: We will sell no wine before its time.

John Annarino recalls that Welles could be difficult on set, and wrote:

Filming the first commercial was a near disaster. When our director said, "Action!" there wasn't any. Only a lengthy silence which Orson finally broke by saying, "Don't say 'Action.' Don't say anything." While we mulled this over, our director, hired for his wit as well as his talent, wrote something on a piece of paper and handed it to Orson, who read it and smiled. The director had written the word "Action"!"

A brief out-take survives from the first advert, of Welles scowling upon being told, "Action!", holding his hand up and saying, "Do you mind not saying 'Action'?"

=== Subsequent commercials ===
==== 1978: Dressing room, Rhine Castle ====
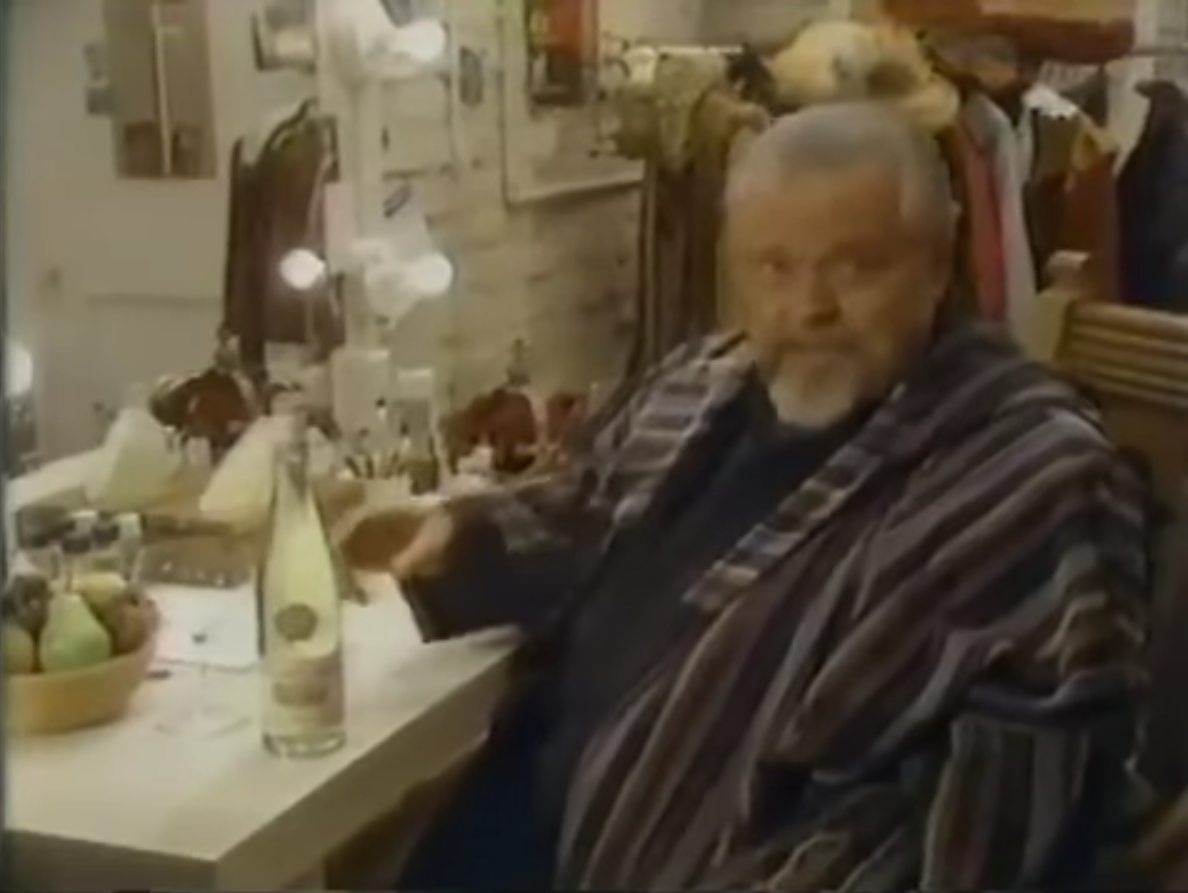
Dressing room

The second ad showed Welles with a bottle of Rhine Castle riesling in a theatre dressing room, in theatrical costume and makeup, telling the camera:

A great deal of time and care go into the production of a fine play, just as they go into the making of a fine wine. Paul Masson's Rhine Castle—the taste is smooth, flavourful, delicious. Paul Masson's wines taste so good because they're made with such care. What Paul Masson himself said nearly a century ago is still true today: We will sell no wine before its time."

The setting of a theatre was a somewhat incongruous one—at the time of shooting, Welles had neither acted in nor directed any plays for 18 years. Annarino remembers filming the commercial:

The second commercial had Orson seated at a makeup table in his dressing room wearing a large caftan. Underneath the caftan he wore his big black jacket. I mentioned the jacket wouldn't show in the commercial so maybe he'd be more comfortable without it. "Oh, no," said Orson. "It makes me look bigger." It sure did."

==== 1978: House party, "Champagne" ====
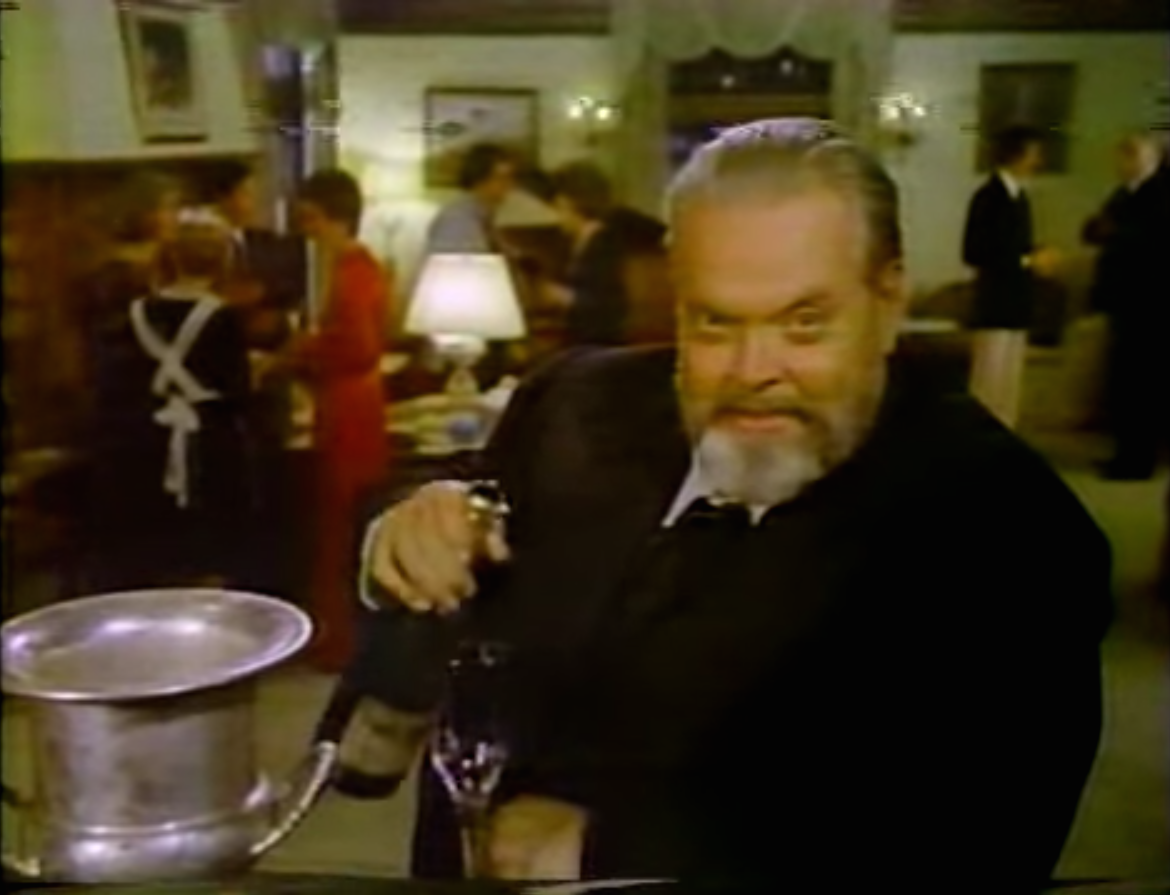
House party

This showed Welles hosting a party, supposedly in his home (actually filmed in a rented Los Angeles mansion), with background piano accompaniment, telling the camera,

I like to cast a party the way I cast a play, with very special people, and the champagne must be equally special. Paul Masson: a premium Californian champagne of impeccable taste. Paul Masson wines taste so good because they're made with such care. Old Paul Masson himself said it nearly a century ago: We will sell no wine before its time.

It was during the filming of this ad that Welles complained about the extras hired for the scene. Welles's biographer Barbara Leaming describes the occasion:

"Who the hell are these people?" Orson asked the director.

"They're at a party," the director responded.
"A party at my house?" Orson asked, as the admiring actors marvelled at his presence.
"Yes."

"I wouldn't have these people at a party at my house," Orson told the director. "These people look like a party Robert Young would have!"

==== 1979: Gone With the Wind, Emerald Dry ====
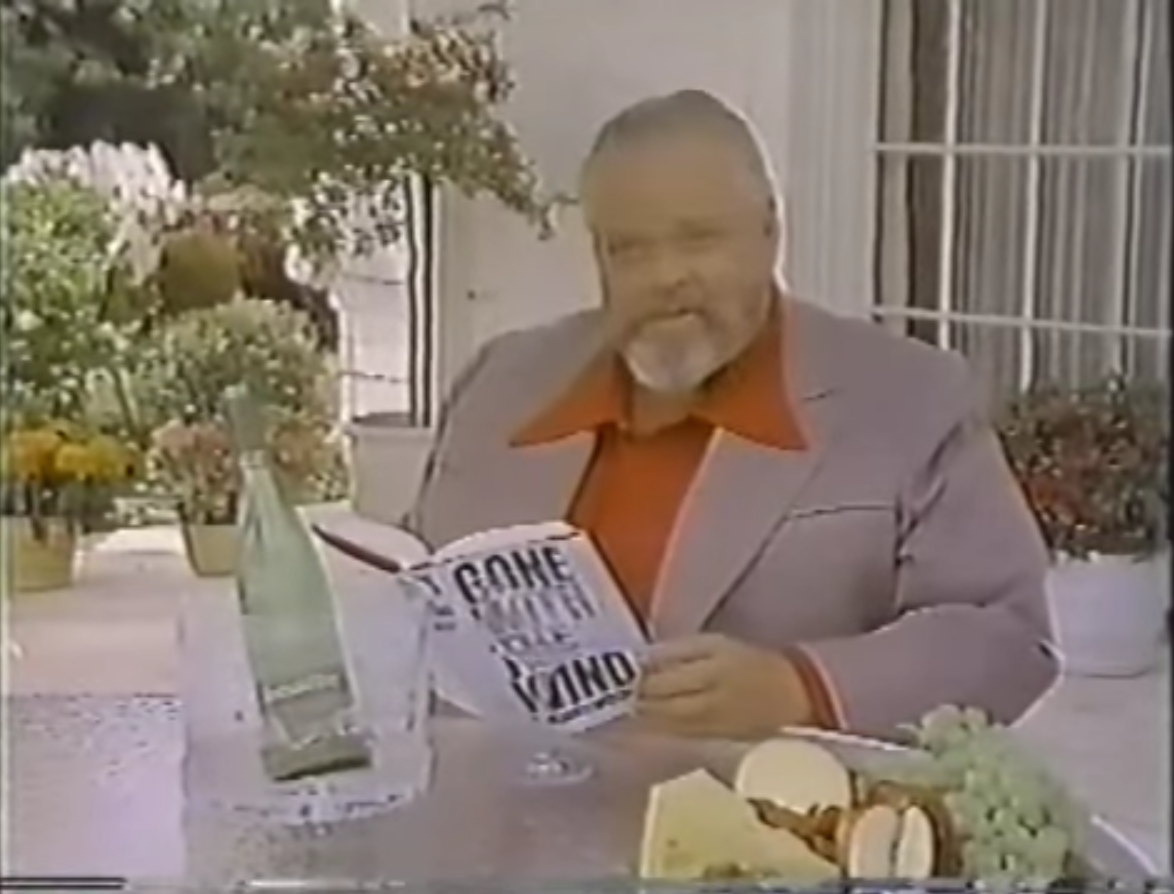
Gone with the Wind

Reading a copy of Gone with the Wind at a table in the garden of his real-life house at 1717 North Stanley Avenue, off Hollywood Boulevard, Welles says:

Margaret Mitchell began writing Gone with the Wind in 1926, and she finished it ten years later. The writing of a great book, or the making of a fine wine, takes time. Paul Masson's Emerald Dry, a delightful white wine. Paul Masson wines taste so good, because they're made with such care. What was true nearly a century ago is still true today: Paul Masson will sell no wine before its time.

This ad was reportedly a last-minute improvisation by Welles after he dismissed the original script he was given, which compared Paul Masson wine to a Stradivarius violin.

==== 1980: "French" "Champagne" ====
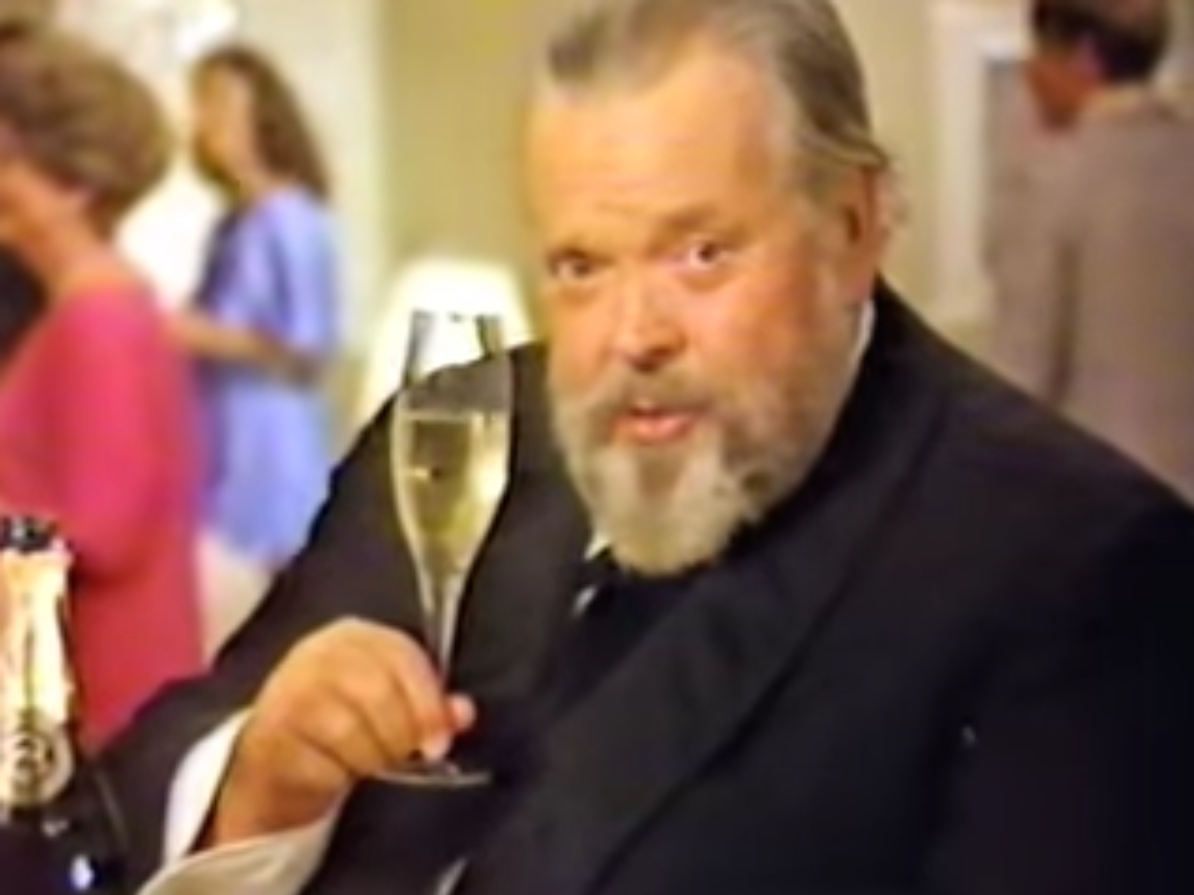
French champagne

In what inadvertently became the most famous Paul Masson ad due to the leaked out-takes (see below), Welles was seated at a party with two young people, including actress Judith Chapman, announcing:

The taste of French champagne has always been celebrated for its excellence. There's a California champagne by Paul Masson, inspired by that same French excellence. It's fermented in the bottle, and like the best French champagne, it's vintage dated. Paul Masson's superb taste shouldn't be too surprising: This champagne doesn't come from France—but it was created by a man who did: Paul Masson. Paul Masson will sell no wine before its time.

Welles's apparently drunken inability to get through this script without severely slurring his speech, visibly swaying as he propped himself up at the table, formed the basis of the out-takes.

==== 1980: Chateau tasting party, Chablis ====
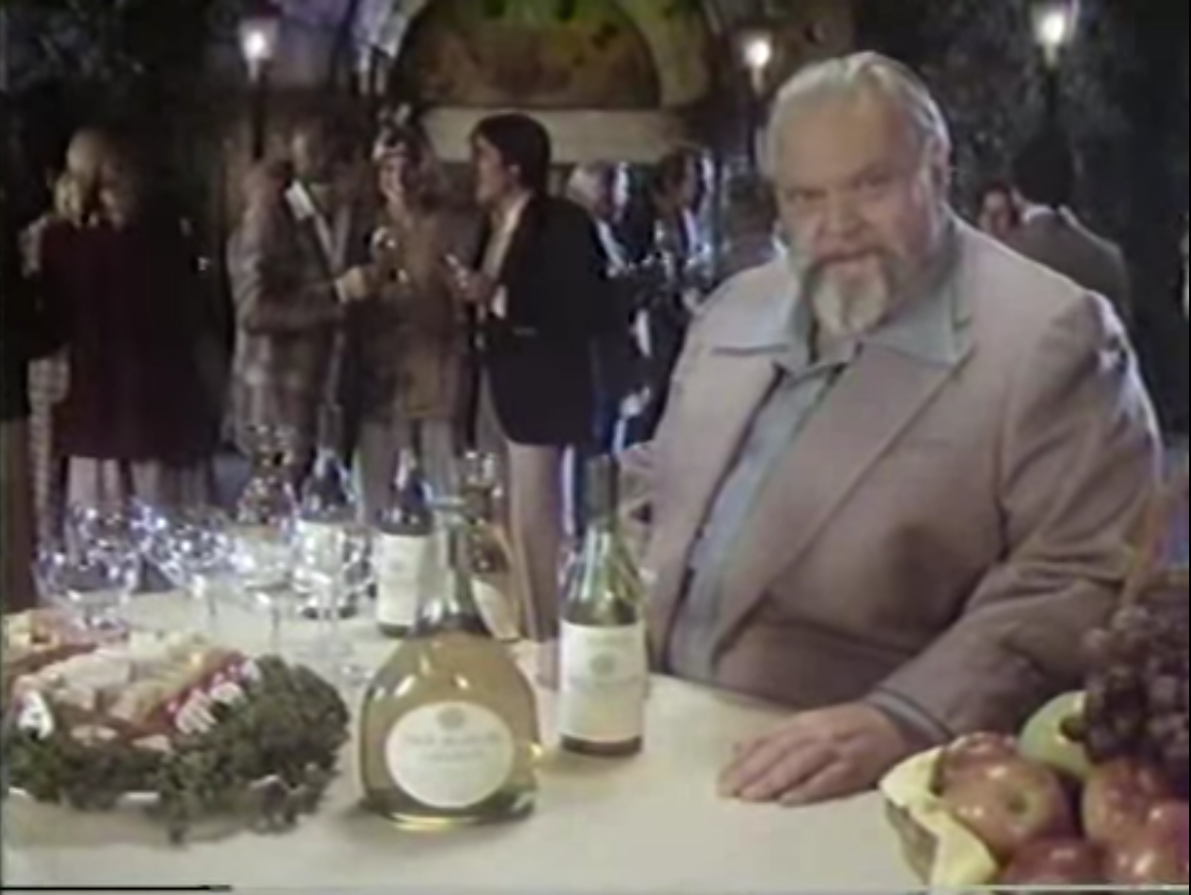
Tasting party

This had Welles seated in the gardens in front of the portal of Paul Masson's chateau (the entrance to an eighteenth century Spanish church, imported to Saratoga, California) in the San Francisco Bay Area, surrounded by young people:

I'm here at Paul Masson's Chateau in California. Almost every night here there's a wine-tasting party. One of the favourites is Paul Masson Chablis. It's light and crisp, it's delicious. The wine you drink the most should be the best. And they take special care with it here, because they know Chablis is America's most popular wine. Paul Masson Chablis: I recommend it. Paul Masson will sell no wine before its time.

==== 1980: Barbecue, Burgundy ====
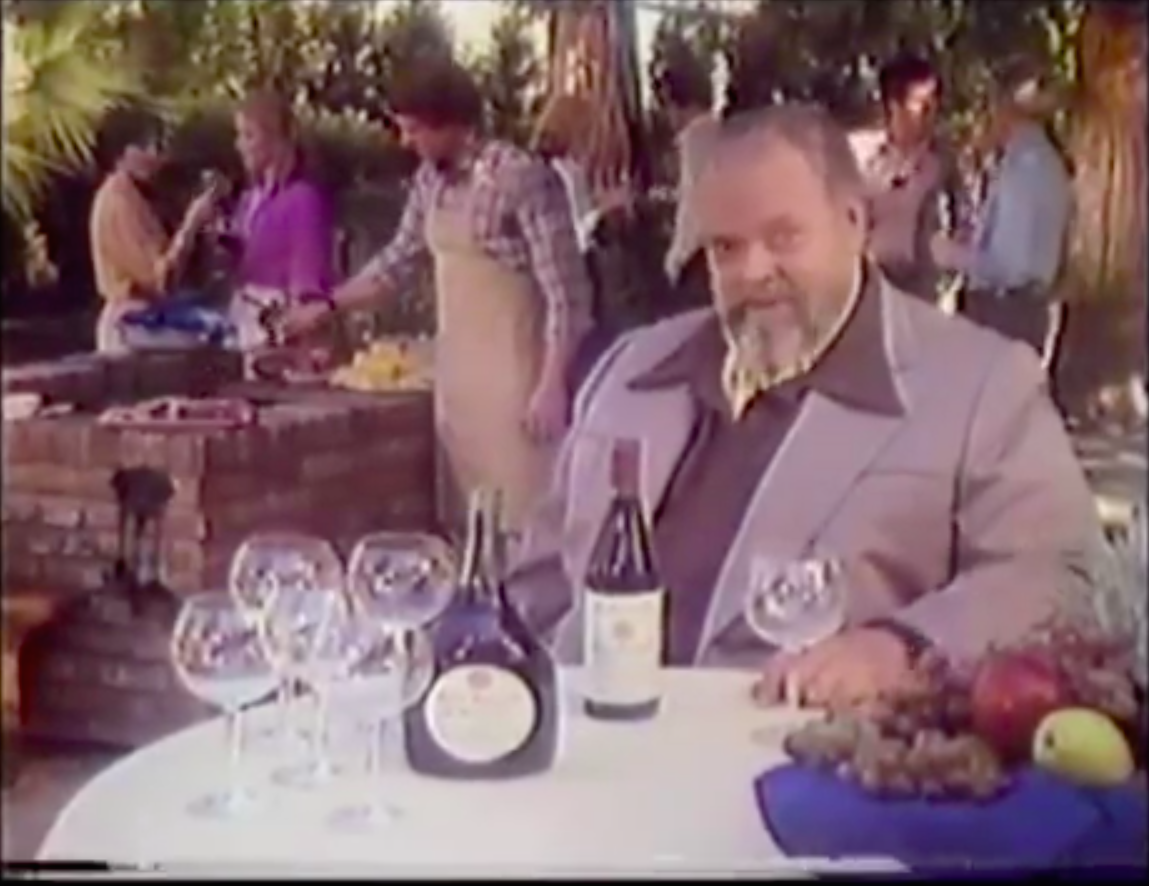
Barbecue

The penultimate time Welles appeared in a television ad in the series, this one had Welles seated at a barbecue, surrounded by young people:

In my family, we think the wine you drink the most should be the best. We like Paul Masson's Burgundy. It's smooth and rich. We serve it to our friends, and now a lot of them are serving it to their friends. Why don't you join us? Next time you go shopping, you're choosing a wine, make it Paul Masson Burgundy. Paul Masson himself said it nearly a century ago: We will sell no wine before its time.

==== 1981: Park, Emerald Dry ====
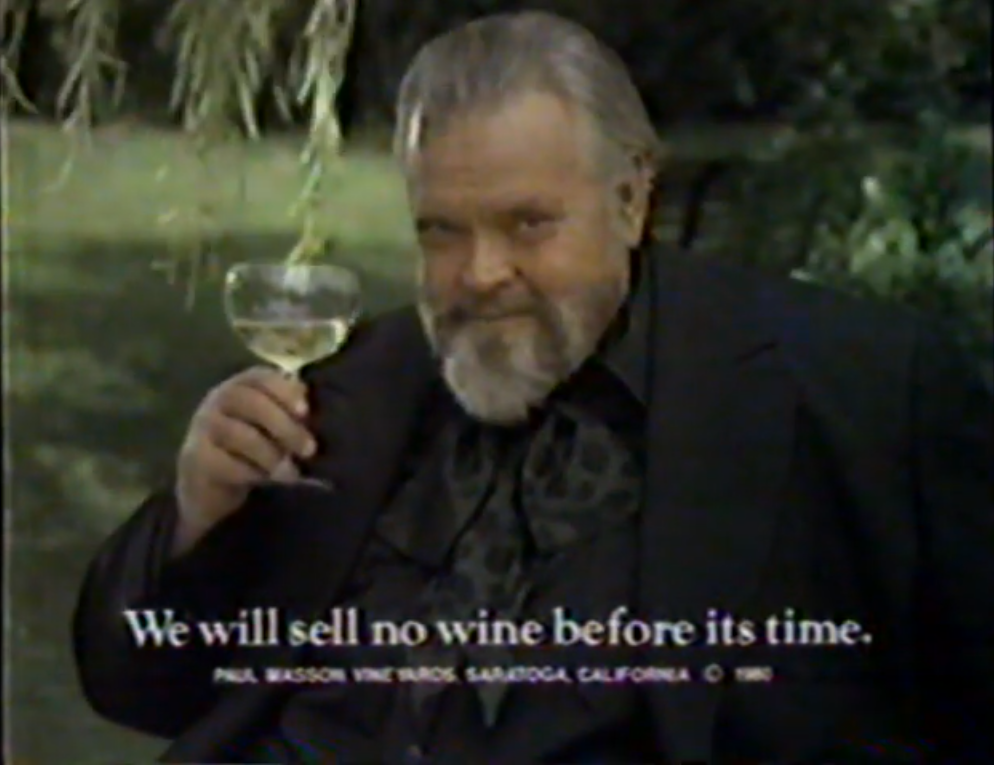
Park

This was Welles's last physical appearance in a Paul Masson television advert, and was restricted to one brief shot at the end of the ad, although he narrated. The advert has the minuet from Boccherini's String Quintet in E major playing in the background, and after a brief opening shot of the Paul Masson chateau, there follows a montage of rural landscapes and pouring wine, finishing on Welles in a park, as he narrates throughout:

Emerald Dry, from Paul Masson.
It's silky-smooth.
It's fresh, and bright.
It's emerald-cool.
It's crisp.
It's sophisticated.
It's Emerald Dry, from Paul Masson.
We will sell no wine before its time.

==== 1981: Europeans, Carafe ====
Welles simply provided the voiceover for his last Paul Masson television ad—he did not appear in person. The ad sought to promote a range of Paul Masson wines, focussing on the distinctive "carafe"-shaped bottle they came in, complete with jam-jar top, and portrayed various European families drinking wine with meals. The voiceover backed by guitar music stated:

When Europeans get together with friends, they serve their wine in a carafe. Thanks to Paul Masson, we can enjoy this same tradition. Paul Masson's convenient carafe, sealed fresh at the winery. To capture each wine's delicious flavour, whether it's Paul Masson's delicate, crisp Chablis, rich, mellow Burgundy, or delightful Rosé, the Paul Masson carafe: The time has come for this great way to serve a great wine."

This was the only Paul Masson television ad Welles did in which he did not say the phrase "will sell no wine before its time"—although a caption at the end does repeat this motto.

It appears that this version of the advert was short-lived. After Welles was sacked by Paul Masson, later in 1981 the commercial began running in a re-dubbed version, using the voiceover of a different narrator.

==== 1980-1981: Print ads, Pinot Chardonnay and Cabernet Sauvignon ====
The last of Welles's adverts for Paul Masson were two print adverts featuring the director smiling over a glass and a bottle, released to tie in with the television adverts; one for Pinot Chardonnay, the other for Cabernet Sauvignon.

Experts will tell you they drink Paul Masson Pinot Chardonnay because of its full varietal aroma, brilliant color and long pleasant finish. What they mean is...it tastes good. Paul Masson will sell no wine before its time.

and

Experts say Paul Masson Cabernet Sauvignon is a mature, complex wine, with nice wood. What they're trying to say is...it tastes good. Paul Masson will sell no wine before its time.

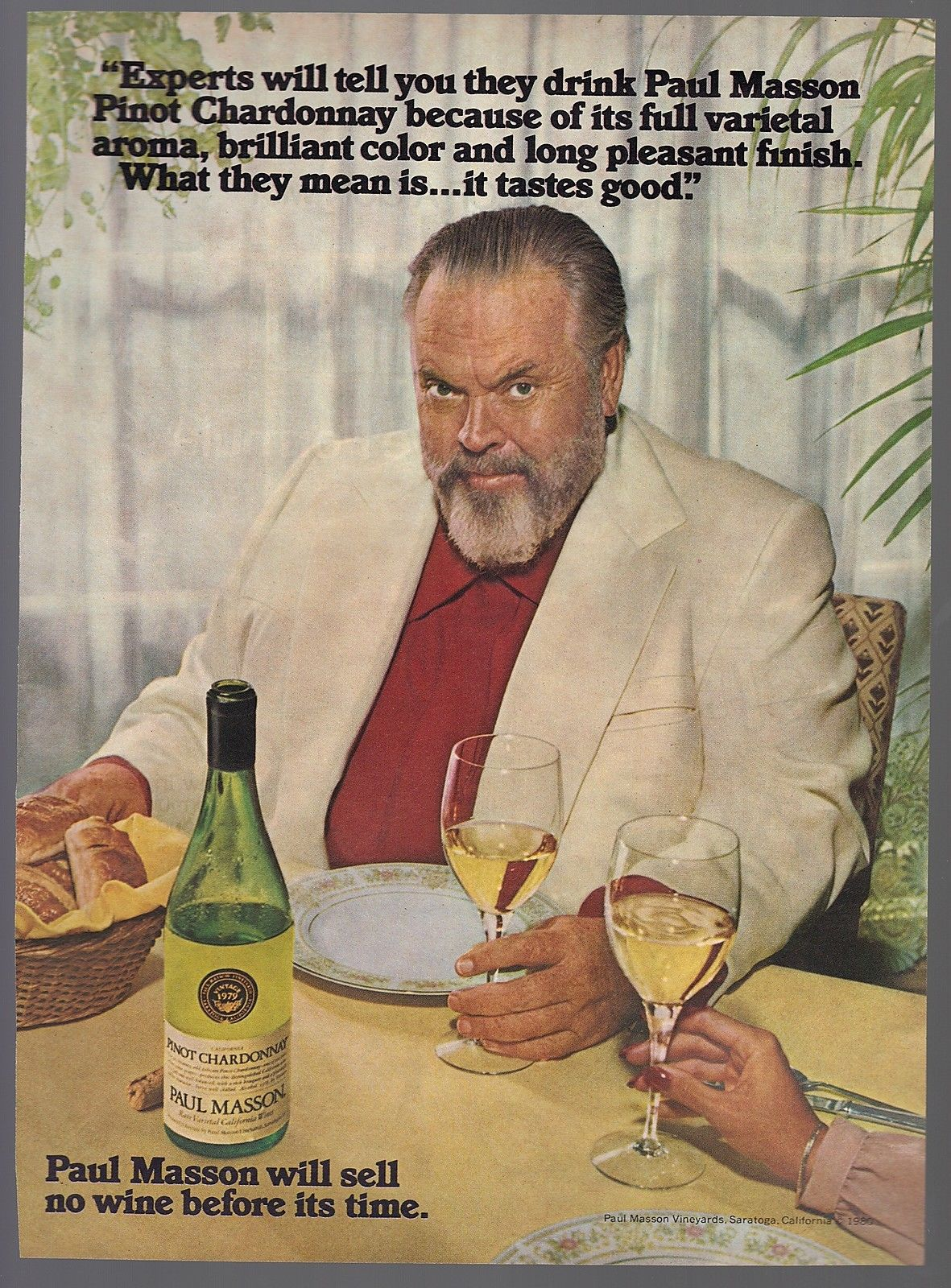

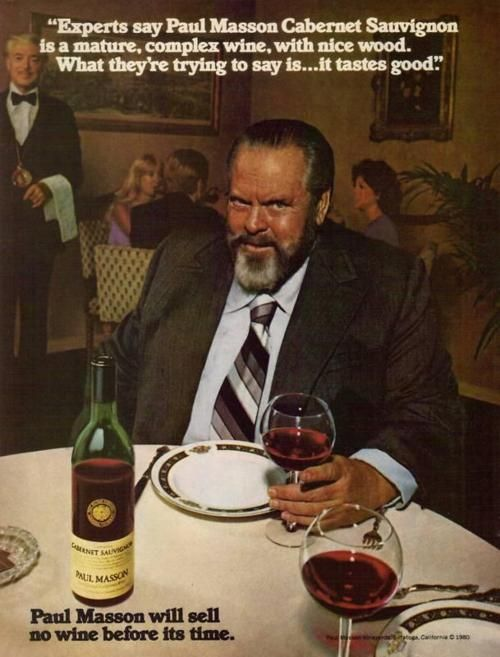

== Out-takes ==
=== Drunken out-takes ===
The best-known series of out-takes consists of three takes for the "French champagne" advertisement. In the first, an off-screen voice yells "Action," but Welles does not react for eight full seconds. "Action Orson, please," the offscreen voice says after a pause. "He doesn't do anything?", asks Welles, referring to the actor holding the champagne bottle, seemingly unaware he himself was intended to act first.

The second and third takes consist of Welles attempting his monologue, though his words are slurred:

Mwaaaah, the French... champagne has always been celebrated for its excellence. There is a California champagne by Paul Masson, inspired... by that same French excellence. It's fermented in the bottle, and like the best French champagnes, it's vintage-dated, so Paul Masson's superb... (interrupted)

Welles was interrupted by an offscreen voice shouting "Cut!" before finishing his lines. Throughout the takes, Welles appears to be having trouble remaining upright, clearly propping himself up on the table while tapping his fingers impatiently, and several of the extras are visibly struggling not to laugh.

As part of his Paul Masson contract, Welles was given elaborate lunches prior to filming in the afternoon. John Annarino, the DDB Needham advertising executive handling the Paul Masson account, recalled that at these pre-shoot lunches, "Welles found it "barbaric" not to begin a meal with soup," and noted of Welles's lunchtime drinking, "Orson liked Paul Masson's cabernet. He often called the ad agency and instructed, 'Send more red.' The agency sent more red." It has been speculated that this is what may have led to his state during the recording session. However, Assistant Director Peter Shillingford disputed this: "I've read that he'd demand these huge meals, but he never ate lunch on the shoots I did with him. I'd sit with him and have a snack and he'd tell stories of old Hollywood and they were outrageous."

In 2021, Shillingford went on the record for the first time, to give a far fuller account of the day than had previously emerged:

[H]e called us to say he would be late. We were supposed to begin at 10[am] at a mansion in Los Angeles, and the crew and the extras and the agency people were all waiting for him. Finally, at noon, the limo arrived at the mansion and the driver came and found me and brought me outside. The agency men also followed along. When I got out there, Orson beckoned me into the back of the limo.

"I'm in trouble, Shillingford," Orson began. He was puffing on a cigar and looking very untidy. His hat was on the floor, his tie was loose and his shirt was buttoned up wrong. He was pissed [i.e., drunk], he was sleepy and he was mumbling. "Last night I was filming in Las Vegas. We had camera problems so the shoot went late—to dawn! I have not slept at all!" he told me. The agency men tried approaching, but I waved them away. Orson explained that he'd taken a sleeping pill when he left Las Vegas to sleep in the limo, but it had only just begun kicking in and his speech was beginning to slur. He finally asked me, "What do you suggest?"
I told him that the camera and the extras were already in place, so let's give it a try. I knew he couldn't do it, but I told him that I had to put him on camera for insurance reasons, so that we could show that he was all over the place and that we couldn't do the job—that way we'd have insurance coverage for the day because of the actor malfunctioning. He understood, so I helped him out of the vehicle; he held onto my arm and we walked in. The makeup girl ran up but he shooed her away, then we plonked him on his piano stool and began.

We did three takes and what you see on camera makes it clear how they went…He went on to say most of the dialogue right, but he was so obviously pissed that we couldn't use it.

Shillingford went on to describe what happened after the out-takes:

I then turned to the director and one of the men from the agency, and we all agreed there was no production here, so I sent everyone to lunch and asked the owner of the mansion—a very nice lady—if we could bed down Orson for a couple of hours. She was thrilled and told me that the maid's room was just over there—I wouldn't be surprised if she later put a plaque there saying "Orson Welles slept here." So I put Orson in the maid's room and helped him out of his jacket and his trousers, and he took his shirt off. He was standing there with just his little grubby underpants on and he climbed into the daybed. Then I went and handed his clothes to the wardrobe girl…

A couple of hours later, I knocked on the door to the maid's room and Orson shouted, "Where are my clothes Shillingford!? Have I been robbed!?" He was just having a bit of fun, though. He was a professional, and he was good to go now. I sent the wardrobe girl in with the pressed clothes and a cup of coffee, and she came out of the room, stunned, after seeing this huge man in his greying underpants.
By 3 p.m. he'd been seated, and he delivered the lines perfectly. We were done by five, getting everything we needed without overtime. I remember him grinning at the furious agency guys as he walked away from the set…
On the way to the limo, he thanked me and said, "Lunch tomorrow, Shillingford, Ma Maison! One o'clock?"

Of course I accepted. How could I refuse?

The final advert aired managed to avoid embarrassment about Welles's state, though it does not fully bear out Shillingford's insistence that Welles had wholly sobered up by the afternoon. The broadcast version used a combination of retakes (a close-up of Welles holding a champagne flute), cuts away from Welles to close-ups of the wine bottle, and some (not entirely synchronized) dubbing made by Welles later, when he was in a more sober state, over some of the footage shot when he was still evidently inebriated. Jim Hallowes, the director of the advertisement, observed on his personal website in 2009 that it was a "challenge...in dealing with a quite different side of Mr. Welles."

For decades, the clip was only available in blurry, faded Nth-generation copies circulated on VHS cassette, several of which were circulated by voice actor Maurice LaMarche, who regularly impersonated Welles' voice. In recent years, high-quality versions can easily be found on YouTube, having been uploaded by the advert's director.

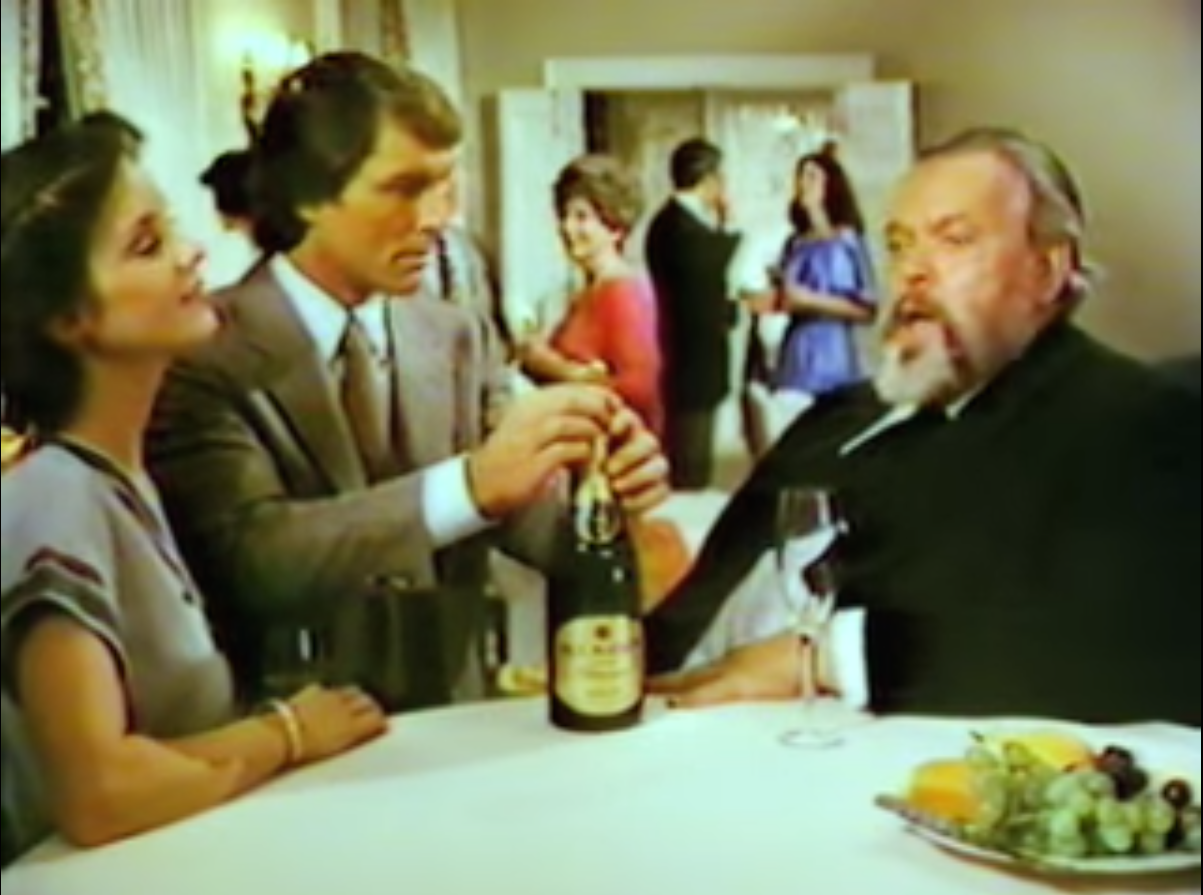

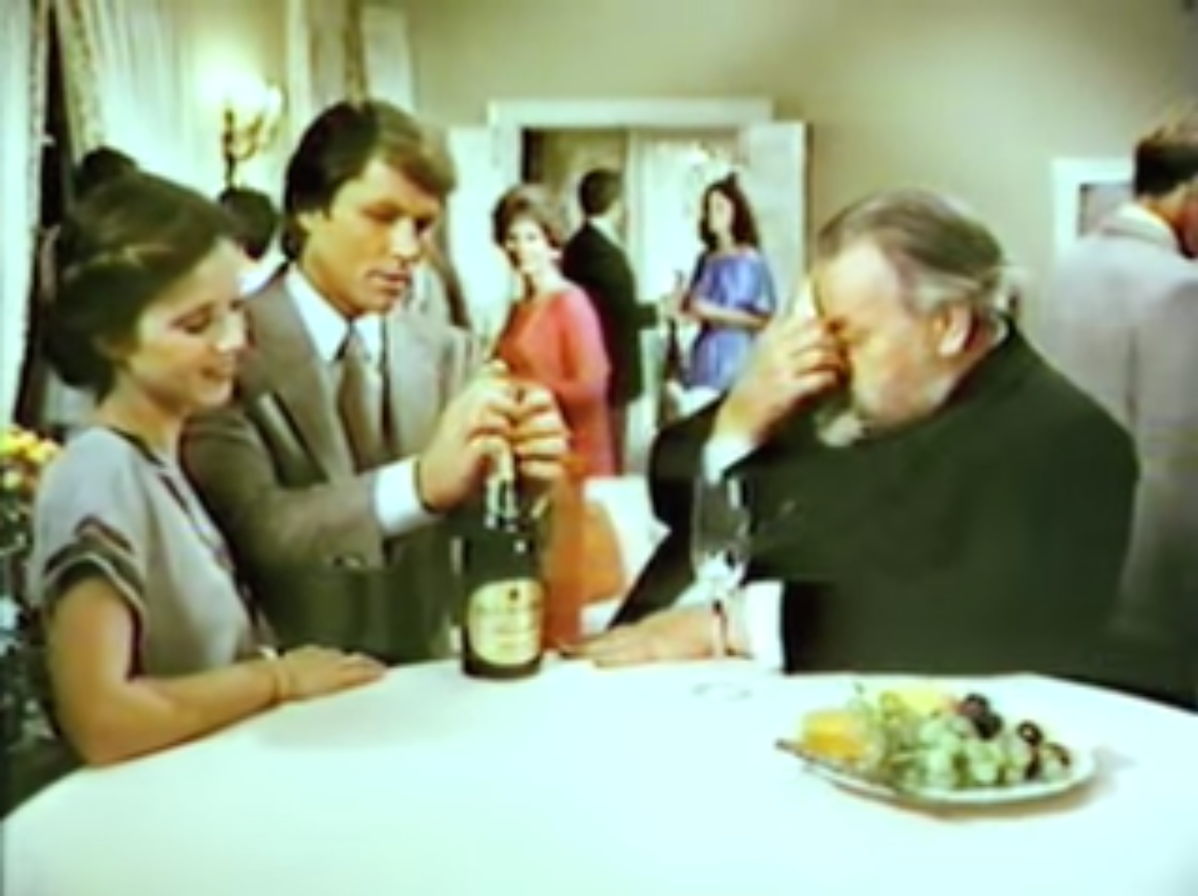

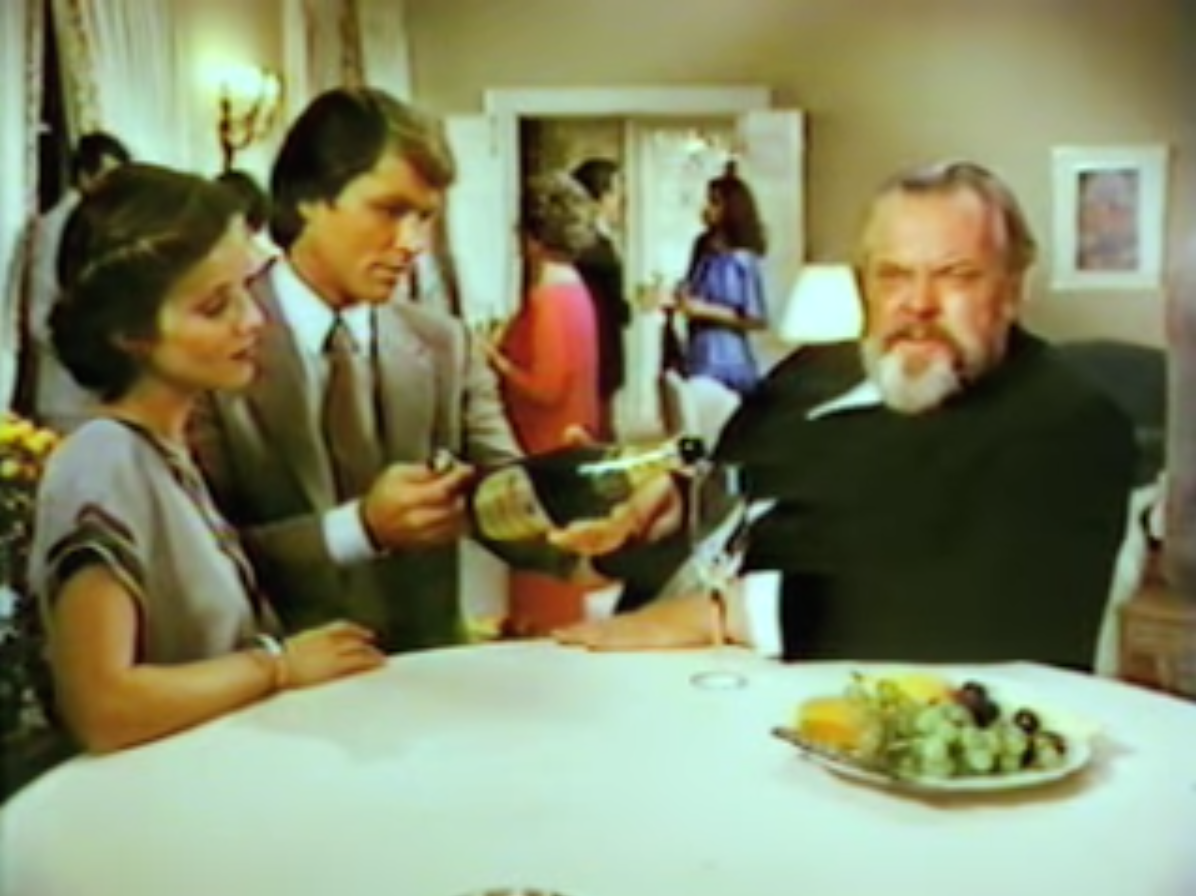

=== Beethoven out-takes ===
In addition to the well-known drunken out-takes, other out-takes from the first Paul Masson advert have circulated. These consist of two short takes. In the first, Welles begins saying, ""It took Beethoven four years to write that symphony," and starts to pour himself a glass of wine, before frowning at the bottle in his hand, and complaining to the director, "It's very hard for me to grab it, you've greased it. I'd better not hold it."

In the second out-take, the offscreen director shouts "Action!", only for Welles to scowl disapprovingly and hold up his hand at him, saying, "Do you mind not saying 'Action'?"

== Welles's firing and aftermath ==
Welles was fired from the ad campaign in 1981. Ostensibly, the reason he was given was that the company wished to promote a new range of "light-bodied summer wines," and it was felt that the slimmer John Gielgud was a more appropriate choice of spokesman than the morbidly obese Welles. However, the wine Gielgud ended up advertising was not a "new" wine, but the same Chablis which Welles had already been advertising. Several Welles biographers have pointed to his unguarded comments on a TV talk show as the reason for his firing—specifically, when asked about the Paul Masson adverts, he mentioned that he was now dieting, and that he no longer drank wine.

Gielgud was not actually hired as Welles' replacement until 1982, whilst for the remainder of 1981, Masson aired both Welles' last "Carafe" advert with new narration dubbed over to remove his involvement, and a new Chablis advert with new narration. This lends further credence to the notion that Welles was sacked some time before Gielgud was engaged.

Gielgud was able to negotiate a $1 million fee (twice what Welles had been paid), and wrote of his own successor ads to philosopher George Pitcher in September 1983: "I bought some new pictures and sculpture with my ill-gotten gains. The Paul Masson commercials are apparently a great success and they have picked up a further six months profitable option." Between 1982 and 1985, Gielgud filmed several Paul Masson adverts based on his Academy Award-winning performance as the condescending butler in Arthur (1981), with Gielgud making catty observations whilst successively serving up Paul Masson wines in an art gallery, a fashion show, a diplomatic reception, and a stately home being cleaned. Gielgud further wrote of the perks in February 1985:

The wine commercial people want to renew my contract again, which is a great help to the exchequer, though the sessions are exhausting and somewhat humiliating. But I hear people find them amusing and I marvel at them wanting me to go on making them. They only demand about three days work each time, with full attention to my comforts in the way of limousines, suites at the Savoy, flowers and cigarettes provided!

Gielgud also stipulated that he did not want the Paul Masson adverts—which he felt were beneath him—to be aired in his home country of the United Kingdom. This led to Paul Masson hiring English actor Ian Carmichael to do their British adverts after Welles.

In late September 1985, after Gielgud had shot his last commercial for the wine, the Davis & Gilbert advertising agency wrote to Welles, asking if he would be interested in resuming the Paul Masson adverts. They offered him $225,000 a year - half his old fee, and less than a quarter of what Gielgud had received - and asked him to make promotional appearances around the USA. At a lunch on 5 October 1985, Welles told his friend the director Henry Jaglom that he declined the offer, at least in part because he felt too old to be touring the country, and described it as a "terrible wine". Welles died a few days later.

== Critical reception ==
Film critic Joseph McBride argues that the advertisements became synonymous with the perception of Welles as a recluse and a failure in his later years: "The commercial catchphrase ['We will sell no wine before its time'] became a joke, and a signature line for Welles himself, helping to define his personality in the media as that of a hedonist who preferred to dawdle over his vineyard interminably, releasing the fruits of his labor only rarely, if ever."

== Parodies and popular culture ==
In the years since the adverts aired, their popularity has further grown as they have been the target of various spoofs and pastiches.

Even as the adverts were airing, they were subjected to parody—Steve Martin's 1980 TV special All Commercials... A Steve Martin Special, features Martin inducting Welles into the "Commercial Hall of Fame" for his three great works: "Citizen Kane, The Magnificent Ambersons, [and] Serve No Wine Before Its Time," and introducing a spoof beer advert in which Welles (played by John Candy) breaks down a wall for his entrance.

The "Weird Al" Yankovic 1985 song "Dare to be Stupid" contains the line "You'd better sell some wine before its time" referring to this ad campaign.

The 1990s cartoon series The Critic featured assorted parody adverts by Welles (or sometimes the ghost of Welles), voiced by Maurice LaMarche, in the style of the Paul Masson adverts. For instance, one advert for "Blotto Bros Wine" has Welles telling the viewer, "A rich, full-bodied wine, sensibly priced at a dollar a jug. And now for a little magic, I shall make this jug disappear," before promptly drinking the entire contents of the bottle in one swig.

The Paul Masson out-take has also been a recurring target for YouTube pastiches in recent years, including spoofs by The Midnight Show and others.

The D.C.-based band "The French Champagne" takes its name from the 1980 advert and its out-takes.
