= Chevalier (name) =

Chevalier is both a French surname and a title. Notable people with the name include:

Surname:

- Albert Chevalier (1861–1923), English comedian and actor
- Anaïs Chevalier (born 1993), a French biathlete.
- Anne Chevalier (1912–1977), French Polynesian actress and dancer
- Auguste Chevalier (1873–1956), French botanist
- Antoine Gombaud, Chevalier de Méré (1607–1684), French writer
- Caroline Chevalier (died 1917), British writer and traveller
- Darializa Avila Chevalier (born 1993 or 1994), American politician and activist
- Evelyn Chevalier, a fictional character from Zenless Zone Zero
- Georges Chevalier (army officer) (1854-1938), French army officer
- Georges Chevalier (photographer) (1882-1967), French photographer
- Godfrey Chevalier (1889–1922), American naval aviator
- Grahame Chevalier (1937–2017), South African cricketer
- Haakon Chevalier (1901–1985), author
- Jay Chevalier (1936–2019), American singer
- Judith Chevalier, American economist
- Jules Chevalier (1824–1907), French Roman Catholic priest
- Lucas Chevalier (born 2001), French footballer
- Marcel Chevalier (1921–2008), French executioner
- Maurice Chevalier (1888–1972), Belgian-French actor, singer, and popular entertainer
- Michael Chevalier (1933–2011), German lip-sync speaker and actor
- Michel Chevalier (1806–1879), French engineer and economist
- Mike Chevalier (1943–2006), American cinematographer
- Morgan Chevalier, fictional character
- Nicholas Chevalier (1828–1902), Australian artist
- Nicole Chevalier, American soprano
- Papa Joe Chevalier (1948–2011), American sports talk radio host
- Pierre Chevalier (caver) (1905–2001), French caver and mountaineer
- Scarlet Moon de Chevalier (1950–2013), Brazilian actress, journalist and writer
- Sivaji Ganesan Chevalier (1927–2001), Indian actor and politician
- Teddy Chevalier (born 1987), French footballer
- Tracy Chevalier (born 1962), historical novelist
- Ulysse Chevalier (1841–1923), French bibliographer and historian
- Victor Chevalier, a fictional character from Tekken video game series
- Yannick Chevalier (born 1987), Saint Martin footballer

Title:

- Chevalier d'Éon (1728–1810), French soldier, spy and androgyne
- Chevalier de Johnstone (1719–c. 1791), Scottish soldier in French North America
- Chevalier de Mailly (d. 1724), French author
- Chevalier de Saint-Georges (1745–1799), Afro-French classical composer, one of the first known composers of African descent in the Western European classical tradition

Given name

- Chevalier Jackson (1865-1958), American physician
