= Georges Chevalier =

Georges Chevalier may refer to:

- Georges Chevalier (army officer) (1854–1938), French military officer
- Georges Chevalier (photographer) (1882–1967), French photographer

== See also ==
- Chevalier (name)
