= The Marriage of Prince Alfred, Duke of Edinburgh =

Painting by George Housman Thomas

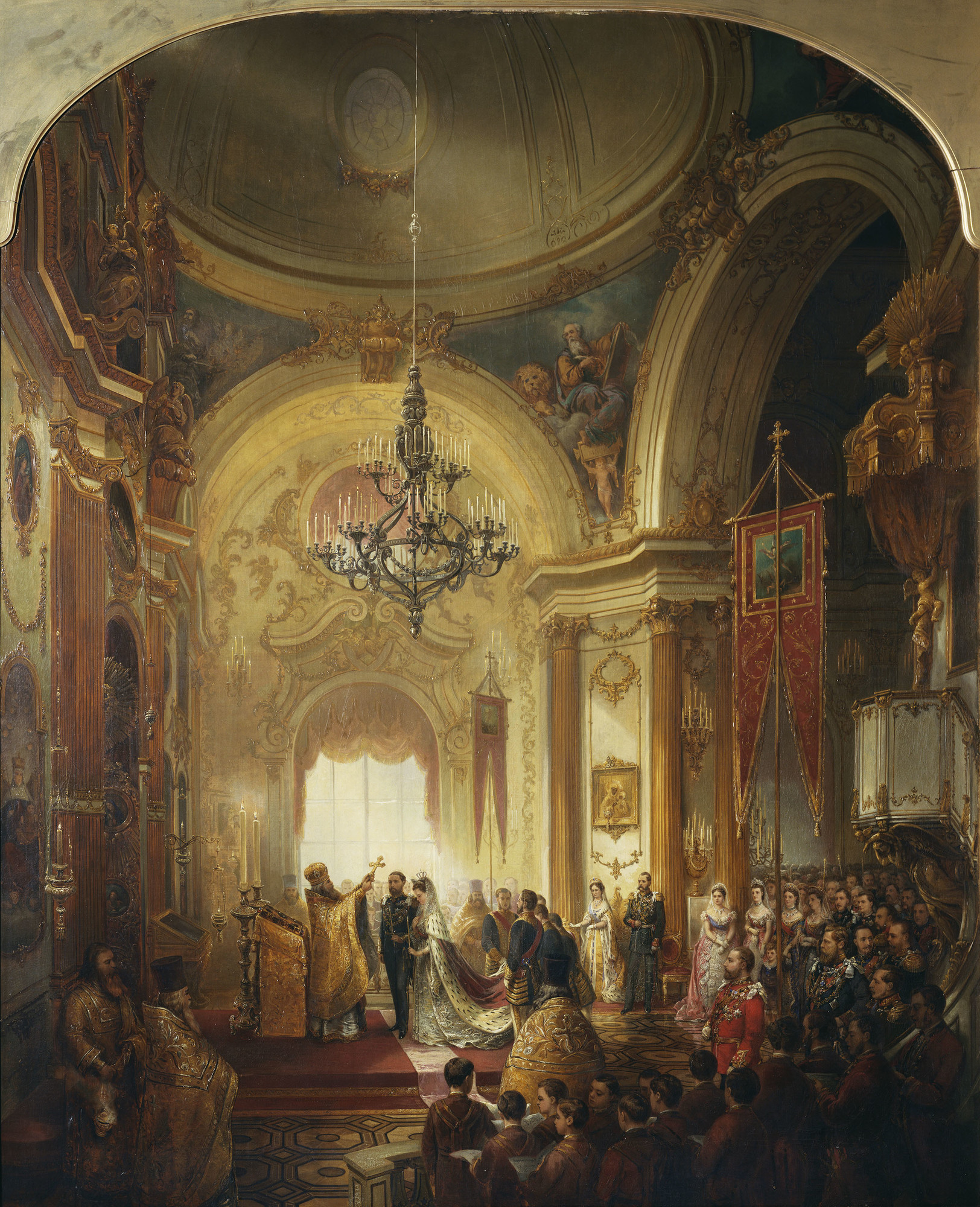
- Artist: Nicholas Chevalier
- Year: 1874–75
- Type: Oil on canvas, historical painting
- Dimensions: 168.4 cm × 138.5 cm (66.3 in × 54.5 in)
- Location: Royal Collection

The Marriage of Prince Alfred, Duke of Edinburgh is an oil on canvas history painting by the Russian-born artist Nicholas Chevalier, from 1874–75.

== History and description ==
It depicts the Orthodox service of the wedding of Prince Alfred, Duke of Edinburgh and Grand Duchess Maria Alexandrovna of Russia in the Imperial Chapel at the Winter Palace.

Alfred was the second son of Queen Victoria and Prince Albert. Maria Alexandrovna was a daughter of Tsar Alexander II of Russia and Tsarina Maria Alexandrovna. Their wedding represented a dynastic marriage between the Romanovs and the House of Saxe-Coburg and Gotha.

The work was commissioned by Queen Victoria, who was represented in the ceremony by her eldest son and heir, Albert Edward, Prince of Wales and Alexandra, Princess of Wales. The groom's eldest sister Victoria, Crown Princess of Prussia was present as well. A young Grand Duke Nicholas (later Nicholas II) stands in front of Maria Feodorovna, the bride's sister-in-law and the Princess of Wales's sister.

Chevalier travelled to Russia for the ceremony and produced watercolours of both the Orthodox and the Anglican services. Upon seeing the sketches, Victoria commissioned a painting of the Orthodox ceremony. The artist later sought the Queen's permission to enlarge the portrait but failed to prepare it on time for the Royal Academy Summer Exhibition. It was delivered to Windsor in November 1875, but moved to Buckingham Palace in 1901.
