= Paul Masson =

American businessman (1859–1940)

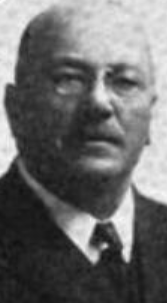
- Born: February 14, 1859; Merceuil, Côte-d'Or, France
- Died: October 22, 1940 (aged 82); San Jose, California, United States
- Occupation: Viticulturist
- Political party: Republican
- Spouse: Louise Lefranc (m. 1888; died 1936)
- Children: 1

Paul Masson (February 14, 1859 – October 22, 1940) was a French-born American winemaker. He is considered an early pioneer of California viticulture known for his brand of Californian sparkling wine.

== Biography ==
Masson was born as the second child to wealthy parents in Merceuil, a wine village outside of Beaune. Both his paternal and maternal families were prominent vintners local to Burgundy, with his mother's side, the Boillot-Grozeliers, hailing from Volnay. In 1877, after finishing his secondary education, his parents arranged for his emigration to the United States, where he lived at the grape plantation of his uncle Louis Grozelier in San Jose, California. He briefly studied at the University of the Pacific during the 1878-79 school year which was in San Jose at the time.

In 1879, he became a student of Charles Lefranc (owner of the Almaden Vineyard and Wine Company), one of a number of French immigrants who had expanded the viticulture introduced into the Santa Clara Valley by the Catholic mission fathers. Masson returned to France in 1880 to finish school at The Sorbonne. After college, he returned to San Jose, California due to the depression in the French wine industry caused by the Phylloxera plague and became the winemaker at Almaden. Masson became engaged to Charles' daughter Louise in 1886. After the death of Lefranc in 1887, Masson purchased 573 acres in Saratoga, California, which he named La Cresta. He set about to plant 60 acres, mainly Pinot Noir and Chardonnay with cuttings from Burgundy and re-named the new winery the Paul Masson Champagne Company, now known as The Mountain Winery, which he ran with his brother-in-law Henri Lefranc. According to the Paul Masson company web site, in 1892 Masson's first sparkling wine under the name "champagne" was introduced at Almaden, and Masson eventually became known as the "Champagne King of California" after winning at the Paris Expo in 1900.

During the 1906 San Francisco earthquake, La Cresta sustained some damage, but had his home renovated by 1907.

He was appointed to California's Board of State Viticultural Commissioners on August 30, 1913 and won a grand prize at the World's Fair in 1915. With the ban on alcohol during Prohibition, Paul Masson Champagne Company suffered major financial difficulties and had to rework his business model to instead manufacture canned fruit. The company was, however, allowed to produce a small quantity of wine for sacramental use in Catholic churches, as well as bottles of "medicinal champagne". Masson eventually sold his vineyard in 1930. In 1933, with no sons to take the reins of the business, Masson sold the winery and brand rights to his neighbor Martin Ray.

Throughout the remainder of the 1930s, Masson frequently traveled back to France to visit family there. He died at his home in San Jose on October 22, 1940. Masson was cremated and his ashes scattered on his old estate by his daughter, but a mausoleum was set up at Oak Hill Memorial Park.

== Winery ==
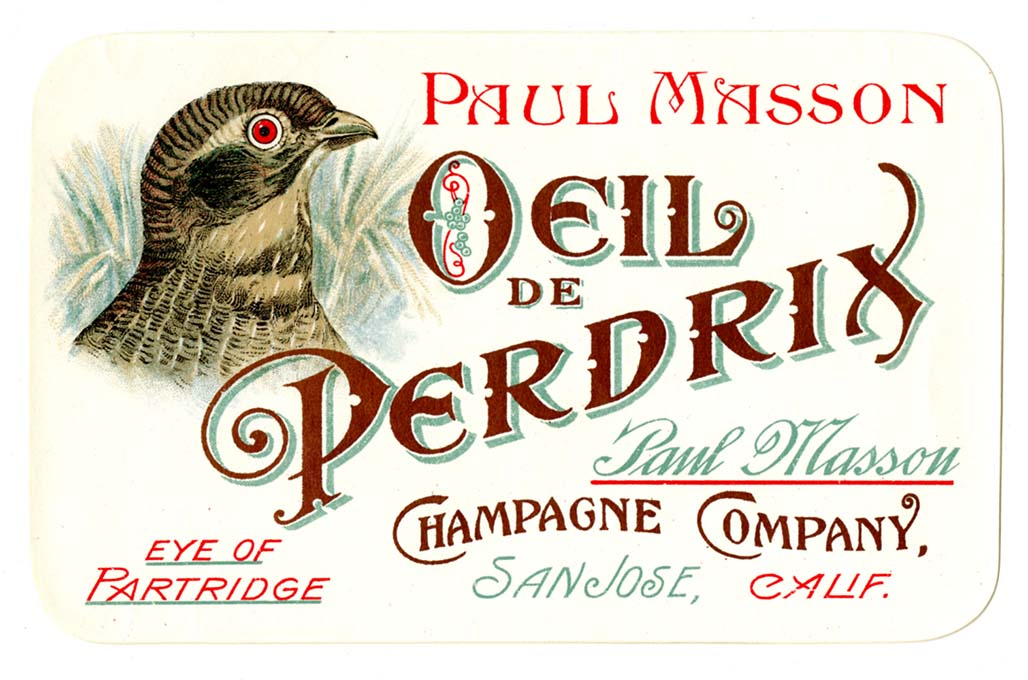
Label, Paul Masson Champagne Company, Oeil de Perdix

Masson shifted part of his production to the Santa Cruz Mountains above Saratoga, California and built his "chateau" on a knob overlooking the Santa Clara Valley in 1905. Now known as "The Mountain Winery", the Paul Masson Mountain Winery is on the National Park Service's National Register of Historic Places, though it ceased making wines in 1952. Instead, it serves as a conferencing and events venue - various events are held at the winery, such as concert series, weddings, and other special events. A chess tournament was held there annually in the late 1970s and early 1980s. Around 2000, the then-current owners of the site hired winemaker Jeffrey Patterson to restart winemaking on site. The vineyards were reestablished at the Mountain Winery in 2004.

== Advertising ==
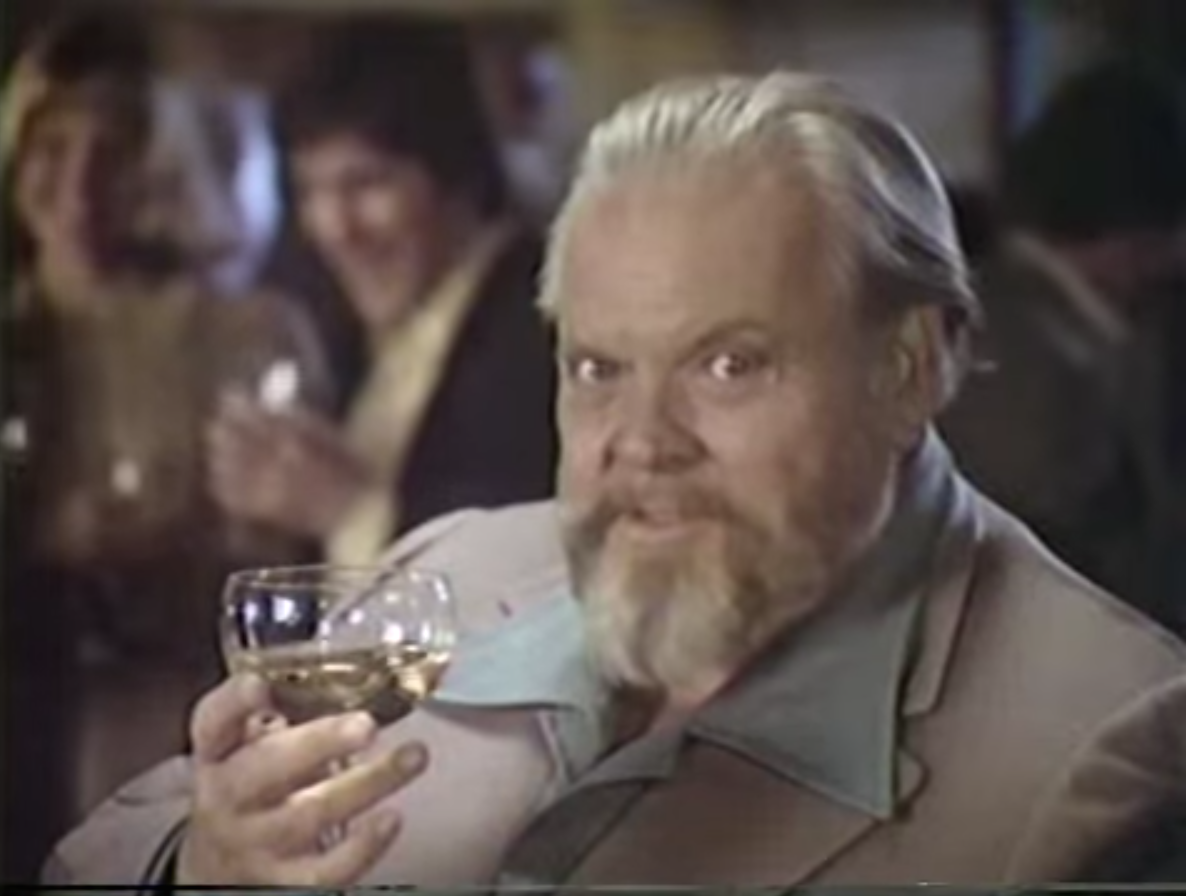
Orson Welles presented a series of distinctive ads for Paul Masson from 1978 to 1981.

The Paul Masson brand is best remembered for its 1978–1981 marketing association with actor-director Orson Welles, who promised for Masson: "We will sell no wine before its time." A widely circulated and much-parodied outtake for one commercial from the campaign features Welles attempting to deliver his lines while severely inebriated.

Welles was eventually fired as a spokesman for the brand in 1981, after answering a question about Paul Masson on a TV chat show, saying that he was now on a diet and so no longer drank wine; he was (briefly) replaced as spokesman by John Gielgud.

Despite the ads' success at the time, the Paul Masson brand has suffered from a long-term image problem, particularly since its founder's death in 1940, in being synonymous with low-end wines. As The New York Times observed in 1990: "While many consumers know them - who can forget Orson Welles's breathy incantation of 'We will sell no wine before its time' for Masson - they lack cachet."

== Paul Masson and NASA ==
In the 1970s, NASA bought Masson Rare Cream Sherry for a Skylab mission and packaged some for testing on a "zero-G" aircraft. Unfortunately, the smell quickly permeated the cabin making astronauts physically sick, and public pressure over taking alcohol into space led NASA to abandon their plans.

== Ownership of Paul Masson wines ==
=== Martin Ray (1936–42) ===
After the death of his wife, Louise Lefranc, in 1936, Masson placed the winery on the market. Mentored by Paul Masson, California wine pioneer Martin Ray purchased the winery and vineyards.

However, two years after Masson's own death in 1940, Ray sold the winery, using the proceeds to buy land on the hilltop across from the old Paul Masson vineyards in Saratoga, where he used Burgundian cuttings of Pinot noir and Chardonnay from the Masson estate to craft a single varietal, region-specific wine from 1943 through 1972, in what is now known as Mount Eden Vineyards.

=== Seagram Company (1942–87) ===
Six years after buying the Paul Masson winery and brand, Martin Ray sold them to the Canadian-based Seagram Company, Ltd, the global wine and spirits conglomerate, which (along with minority share owners) owned the brand for the next 45 years, although as early as 1952 they closed Masson's Saratoga winery as a working wine estate.

It was Seagram who, worried by the brand's sagging sales in the 1970s, brought in first Orson Welles (1978–81) and then John Gielgud (1982–85) as advertising spokespersons for the wines. In the 1980s, Seagram also acquired the Taylor California Cellars brand (and production facilities) from Coca-Cola, based on the premise promoted by Seagram's strategic planning head, Mary Cunningham, that the only way to succeed in the wine business was to approach Gallo's massive sales volume. Over the next twenty years, the American wine industry would dramatically segment itself with, essentially, all the large volume brands falling by the wayside. Internal competition and resulting cannibalization dramatically reduced the combined sales of Paul Masson and Taylor (as it did with Almaden and Inglenook, also owned by a single parent company).

=== Vintners International (1987–93) ===
The above changes resulted in the Paul Masson brand being sold to Vintners International in 1987, although Vintners went bankrupt six years later.

=== Centera (1993–2021); renamed Constellation Brands from 2000 ===
Vintners was in turn purchased by the Centera Wine Company (formerly "Canandaigua") of New York in 1993, as part of Vintner's bankruptcy proceedings. Canandaigua was then renamed Constellation Brands in 2000. Constellation Brands produced two main lines with the label: Paul Masson brandies, and Paul Masson wines.

In 2008, the Paul Masson wine line was sold by Constellation Brands, along with the Paul Masson winery, to the Wine Group. However, Constellation continued to produce Paul Masson brandies until 2021.

In 2019, Constellation Brands announced that it was engaging in a major restructuring which involved focussing on “power brands”, which it defined as commanding a retail price of over $11 a bottle. This meant discontinuing or selling off 40% of their production, including the low-cost Paul Masson brandies produced in New York. Although a buyer was found, the Federal Trade Commission did not approve the sale until 2021.

=== Divestment of the wines and winery to Wine Group LLC (2008–18) ===
In a $134 million deal in 2008, Wine Group LLC of San Francisco purchased the Paul Masson winery, which had ceased making wine in 1952, and now serves as a conferencing and events center. Wine Group LLC subsequently removed the Paul Masson name and renamed it "The Mountain Winery".

As part of the deal, Wine Group LLC also purchased two California wine brands from Constellation Brands, including the Paul Masson table wine range, consisting of three types of bottle sold - white, red, and rosé, made from grapes grown elsewhere in California. The wines were sold in the company's distinctive jam-jar top "carafe" bottles. Around 2018, the company quietly discontinued the sale of Paul Masson wines.

=== Sale of the brandies to Sazerac (2021–present) ===
In 2019, E & J Gallo Winery of Modesto, California began negotiations for the acquisition of the Paul Masson brandies from Constellation Brands. However, the deal was altered in December 2019 due to “competitive concerns” raised by the FTC. The deal, which was mostly related to Constellation’s wine portfolio, was revised to exclude the Paul Masson brandy. In June 2020, Constellation Brands signed an agreement with Sazerac to sell Paul Masson brandy for approximately US$255 million. No one presently makes any Paul Masson wines, as the rights remain with the Wine Group LLC, which discontinued production in 2018. As of 2024, Paul Masson table wines are now listed as part of the Gallo portfolio.
