= Mountain Winery =

- Paul Masson Mountain Winery
- U.S. National Register of Historic Places
- California Historical Landmark
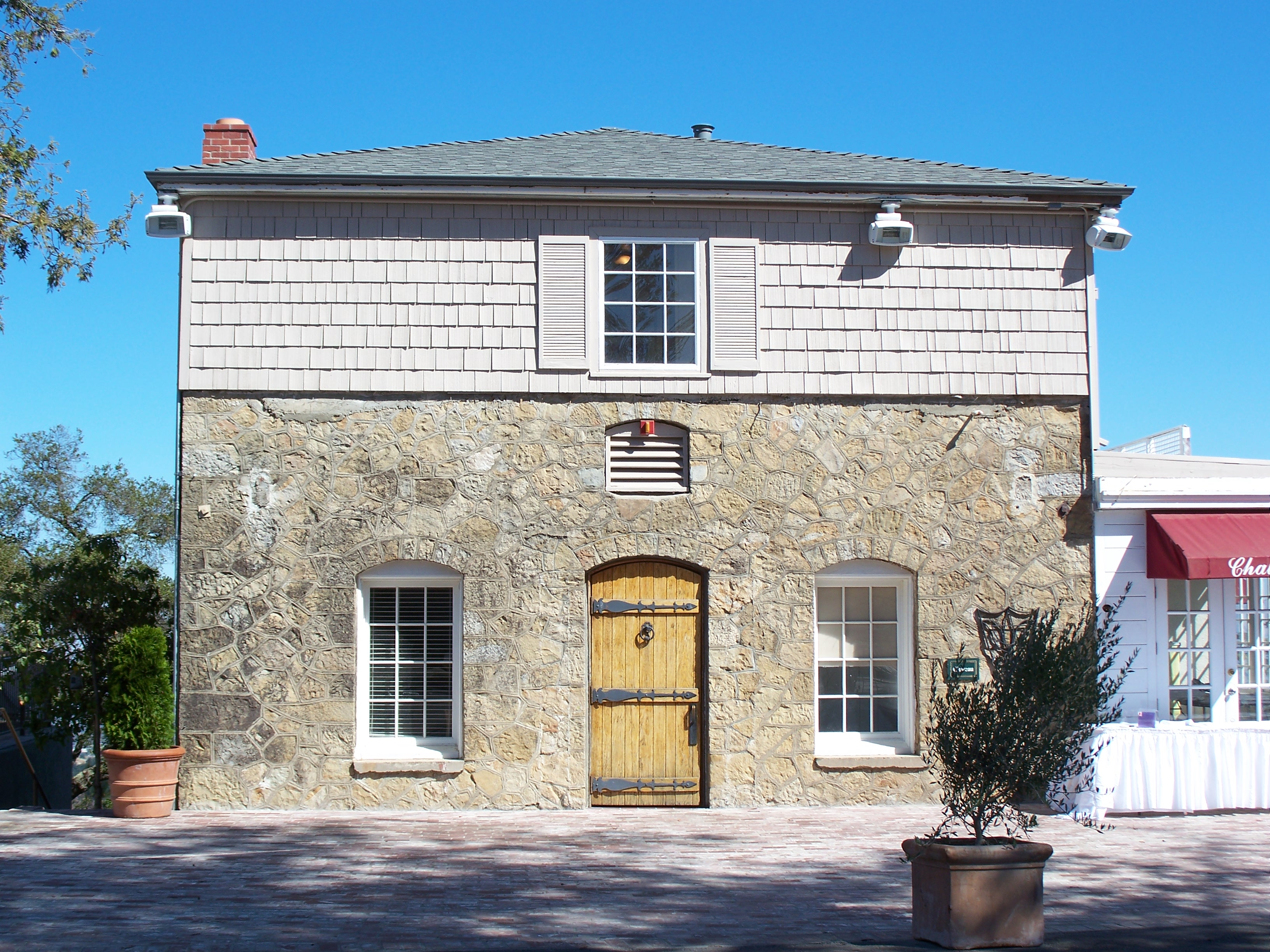
- Location: 14831 Pierce Road, Saratoga, California
- Coordinates: 37°15′37.34″N 122°3′53.77″W
- Built: 1901
- NRHP reference No.: 83001239
- CHISL No.: 733

Significant dates
- Added to NRHP: June 9, 1983
- Designated CHISL: 1960

The Mountain Winery, formerly the Paul Masson Mountain Winery, is a winery in Saratoga, California, United States, North America. It was founded by Paul Masson, a pioneer of the California wine industry. The winery became famous for its slogan, voiced by Orson Welles in television commercials: "We will sell no wine before its time."

The winery is a California Historical Landmark (#733) and is listed on the National Register of Historic Places.

== History ==
Masson originally worked for Charles Lefranc, one of a number of French immigrants who had expanded the viticulture introduced into the Santa Clara Valley by the Catholic mission fathers. After Lefranc's death in 1887, Masson had a short-lived partnership with Lefranc's son Henry. Masson bought out Henry's share in the Almaden Vineyards and in 1892, Masson introduced his first sparkling wine at Almaden, and he eventually became known as the "Champagne King of California".

=== Early 20th century ===
In 1901, Masson purchased the Saratoga property. He later centered his sparkling wine production here in Saratoga while other wines were developed at the Almaden operation.

In 1905, on a knoll above the winery, Masson built his house, dubbed "The Chateau", where he developed a reputation as an unrivaled host. His wife Louise Masson was a prohibitionist and did not attend the lavish dinner parties held at The Chateau. Masson weathered the strains Prohibition placed on the wine industry by selling grapes to the wholesale market and by receiving a special dispensation to sell sacramental wines.

After the 1906 San Francisco earthquake, Masson had the sandstone winery rebuilt using sandstone blocks from the Saratoga Wine Company's building on Big Basin Way, which had also been destroyed. At the same time, the ancient entrance portal from St. Patrick's Church in San Jose, another structure claimed by the quake, was added to the structure.

=== Recent history ===
In 1952, wine making ceased. A series of concerts began six years later, in 1958. These concerts featured famous performers such as Ella Fitzgerald, Tony Bennett, Aimee Mann, Ringo Starr, Stevie Wonder, Ray Charles, The Beach Boys, Santana, Airto Moreira, and Flora Purim.

In the late 1970s and early 1980s, a famous chess tournament was held annually on the grounds of the winery, becoming a regional fixture during the early years of Silicon Valley.

Around 2000, the owners hired winemaker Jeffrey Patterson to restart winemaking at the site. The vineyards were reestablished at the Mountain Winery in 2004.

On August 19, 2010, during a concert featuring folk band The Swell Season, a concert attendee leapt to his death from the roof of the venue onto the stage. The death was deemed a suicide.

In 2011, the concert series was produced in affiliation with Live Nation for the last time. Since 2012, each season of the concert series has been produced by AEG Live.
