= Rancho San Juan Bautista =

Mexican land grant in California

Rancho San Juan Bautista was a 8,880-acre (35.9 km^{2}) Mexican land grant in present-day Santa Clara County, California, given in 1844 by Governor Manuel Micheltorena to José Agustín Narvaez. The grant extended along the Guadalupe River from Los Gatos to San Jose. Within its boundaries were much of today's Willow Glen, Hillsdale, Robertsville and the Lone Hill area.

== History ==
José Agustín Narvaez (Abt. 1778–1873) came to Branciforte in 1797. He was alcade at San Jose in 1821. He was granted the two square league Rancho San Juan Bautista in 1844.

With the cession of California to the United States following the Mexican-American War, the 1848 Treaty of Guadalupe Hidalgo provided that the land grants would be honored. As required by the Land Act of 1851, a claim for Rancho San Juan Bautista was filed with the Public Land Commission in 1852, and the grant was patented to José Agustín Narvaez in 1865.

Narvaez sold a portion of the rancho to Éthienne Bernard Edmond Thée, who came to California from Bordeaux. Thée planted mission grapes, but in 1852 he was joined by a neighbor, Charles LeFranc (-1887), also from France, and they planted cuttings from France, which became the Almaden Vineyards. LeFranc and Thée then built a winery, and chose the name New Almaden Winery, due to the proximity of the town of New Almaden and its namesake Mercury mine. The town and mine were named after the original town of Almaden, Spain because of its Mercury mines.

In 1857 LeFranc married Thée's daughter, Marie Adele, and eventually inherited the property. LeFranc was killed in an accident in 1887, and control of the company passed to his children, Henry, Louise and Marie. His son, Henry was killed in a trolley accident in 1909. Soon after the death of Le Franc, his daughter, Louise, married Paul Masson, who had previously worked under the tutelage of LeBlanc for decades at the Almaden Winery and later established his own winery at Saratoga in 1901. Masson helped guide the winery through the difficult days of Prohibition, then swapped the property in 1930 for Rancho Orestimba y Las Garzas.

== See also ==
- Ranchos of Santa Clara County, California
