= Caroline Chevalier =

British writer (1836–1917)

Caroline Chevalier (née Wilkie; 23 March 1836 – 26 December 1917) was a British writer and one of the first women to write about travelling in New Zealand. On her death, a collection of her deceased husband's works was given to the New Zealand government.

Chevalier was born in London, the daughter of Frederick and Sarah Wilkie. She was married to Nicholas Chevalier, and the Scottish artist David Wilkie was one of her relatives.
