= Merceuil =

- Commune
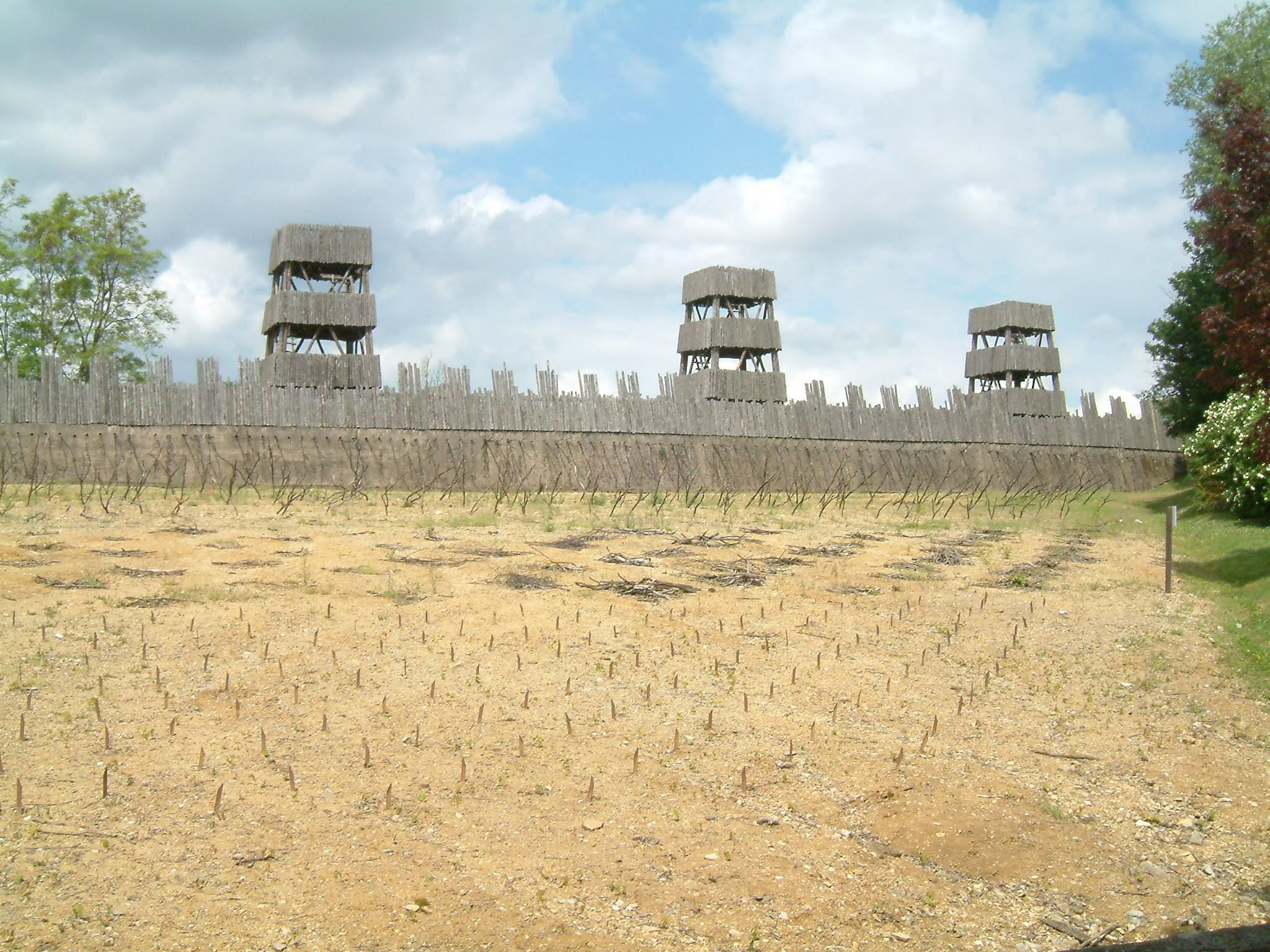
- Beaune Archéodrome

- Coat of arms
- Location of Merceuil
- Location within France Location within Bourgogne-Franche-Comté
- Coordinates: 46°57′00″N 4°50′32″E
- Country: France
- Region: Bourgogne-Franche-Comté
- Department: Côte-d'Or
- Arrondissement: Beaune
- Canton: Ladoix-Serrigny
- Intercommunality: CA Beaune Côte et Sud

Government
  - Mayor (2020–2026): Évelyne Pereira-Chambrey
- Area^{1}: 13.8 km^{2} (5.3 sq mi)
- Highest elevation: 209 m (686 ft)
- Lowest elevation: 185 m (607 ft)
- Population (2023): 815
  - Density: 59.1/km^{2} (153/sq mi)
- Time zone: UTC+01:00 (CET)
  - Summer (DST): UTC+02:00 (CEST)
- INSEE/Postal code: 21405 /21190
- ^{1} French Land Register data, which excludes lakes, ponds, glaciers > 1 km^{2} (0.386 sq mi or 247 acres) and river estuaries.

Merceuil (French pronunciation: [mɛʁsœj]) is a commune in the Côte-d'Or department in eastern France.

== Population ==
Historical population
| Year | Pop. | ±% p.a. |
|---|---|---|
| 1968 | 382 | — |
| 1975 | 370 | −0.45% |
| 1982 | 526 | +5.15% |
| 1990 | 579 | +1.21% |
| 1999 | 548 | −0.61% |
| 2007 | 731 | +3.67% |
| 2012 | 826 | +2.47% |
| 2017 | 812 | −0.34% |
| 2023 | 815 | +0.06% |
Source: INSEE

== See also ==
- Communes of the Côte-d'Or department
