= Mike Chevalier =

American cinematographer (1943–2006)

- Born: August 14, 1943; Los Angeles, California, U.S.
- Died: June 12, 2006 (aged 62); Hollywood Hills, Los Angeles, California, U.S.
- Occupation: Cinematographer

Mike Chevalier (August 14, 1943 in Los Angeles – June 12, 2006 in Hollywood Hills, Los Angeles) was an American cinematographer. He was one of the original seven Founding Fathers of the Society of Operating Cameramen.
