= Nicholas Chevalier =

Russian/Swiss artist (1828–1902)

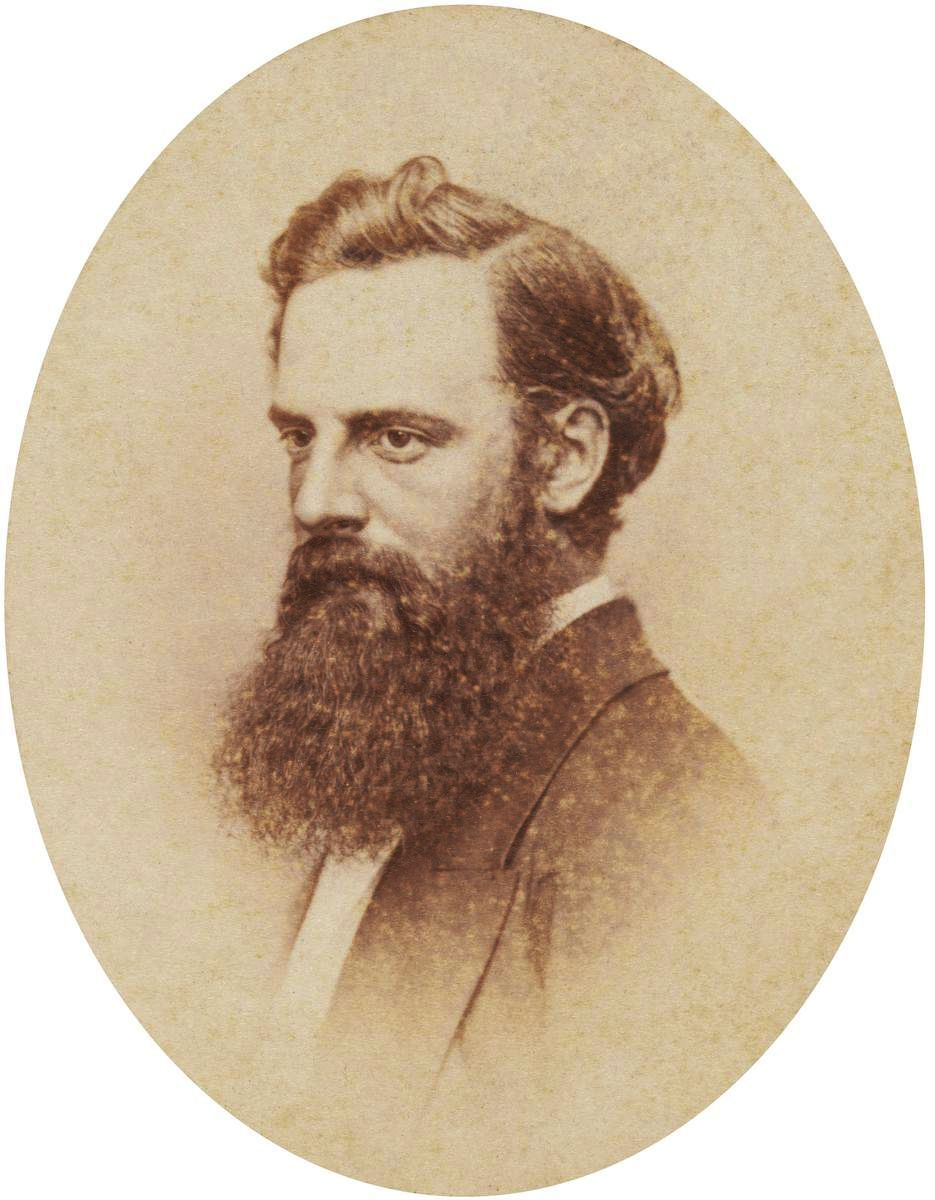
Chevalier c. 1870

Nicholas Chevalier (9 May 1828 – 15 March 1902) was a Russian-born artist who worked in Australia and New Zealand.

== Early life ==
Chevalier was born in St Petersburg, Russia. Nicholas' mother was Russian.

== Career ==
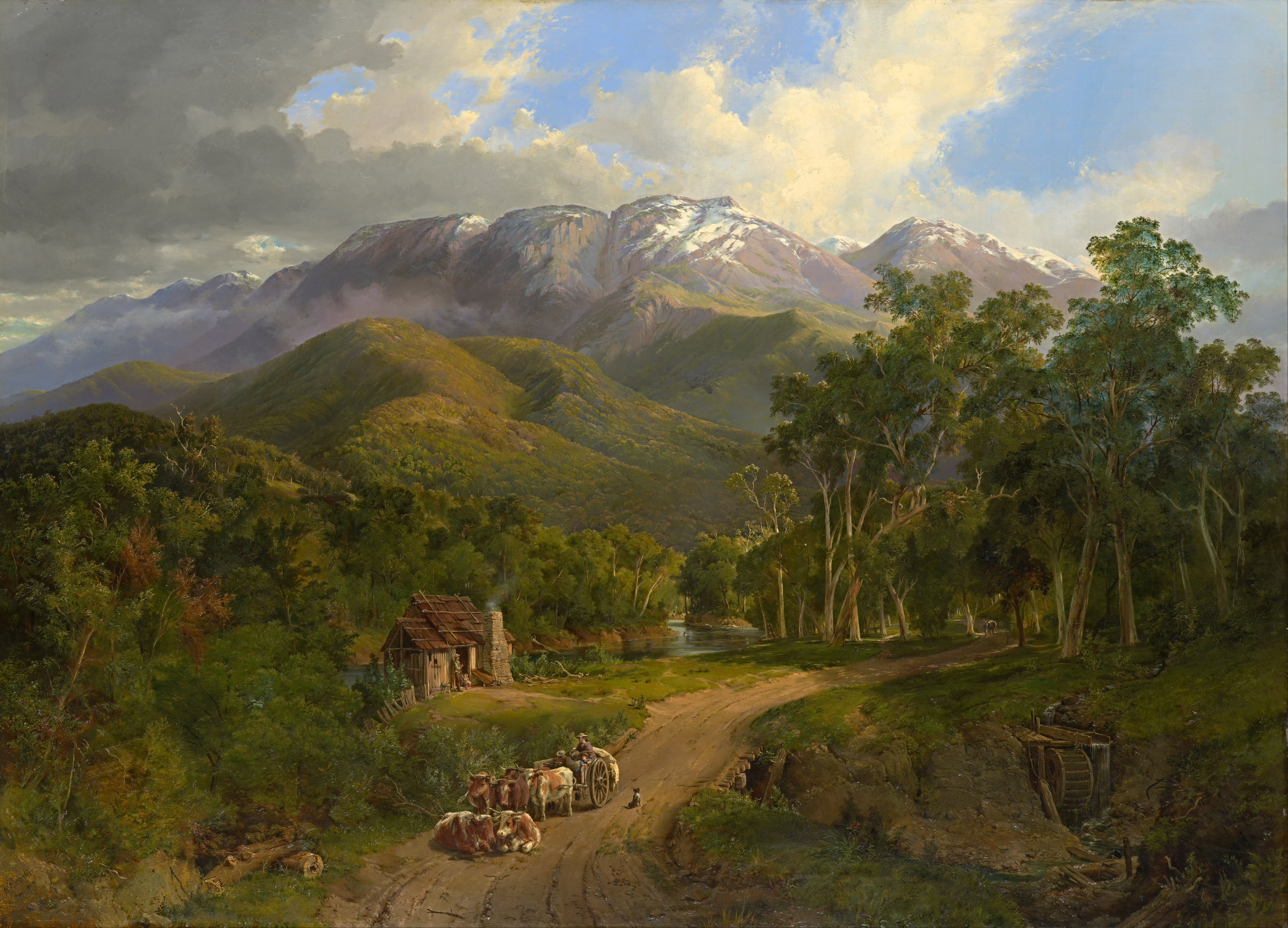
Chevalier's 1864 painting The Buffalo Ranges was the first painting of an Australian subject added to the National Gallery of Victoria's art collection

He accompanied explorer/meteorologist Georg von Neumayer on trips to remote areas of Victoria, and the material gathered on such journeys resulted in some of his most recognised pieces of this period, including his painting of Mount Arapiles in Western Victoria.

Chevalier designed a dress for the governor's wife, the botanist Lady Barkly. The outfit incorporated the Southern Cross, and Chevalier also designed a lyrebird-inspired fan as an accessory to the outfit. It appears that she never wore the dress as she chose to appear as a "Marquise of the Court of Louis XV" for the Mayor's Fancy Dress Ball in 1863. Chevalier and Lady Barkly later collaborated on a present for the newly married Princess of Wales in the same year. The present was from the women of Victoria and like the dress, the chosen silver and gold flower stand design featured icons of Australian life.

== Legacy ==
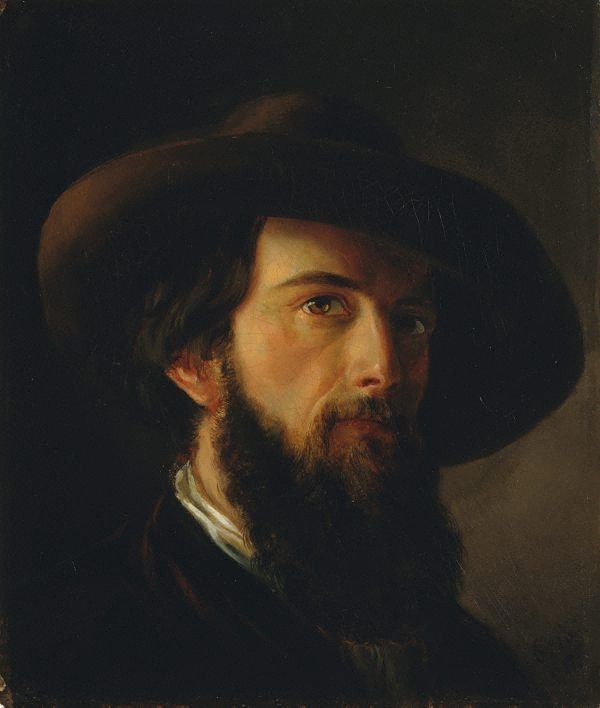
Self-portrait, 1857

Chevalier married Caroline Wilkie in 1855.

The Museum of New Zealand Te Papa Tongarewa, the Dunedin Public Art Gallery (New Zealand), the Honolulu Museum of Art, the National Gallery of Victoria, the Ballarat Fine Art Gallery, Art Gallery of Western Australia, Art Gallery of New South Wales and the National Library of Australia (Canberra) are among the public collections holding works by Chevalier.

Mount Chevalier in Canterbury, New Zealand, is named in his honor.

In 2011 Chevalier was the subject of a major survey exhibition and publication, Australian Odyssey, mounted by the Gippsland Art Gallery in Sale, Victoria, which subsequently showed at the Geelong Art Gallery, Victoria.

Lithography of landscapes in Victoria 1860s by Nicholas Chevalier
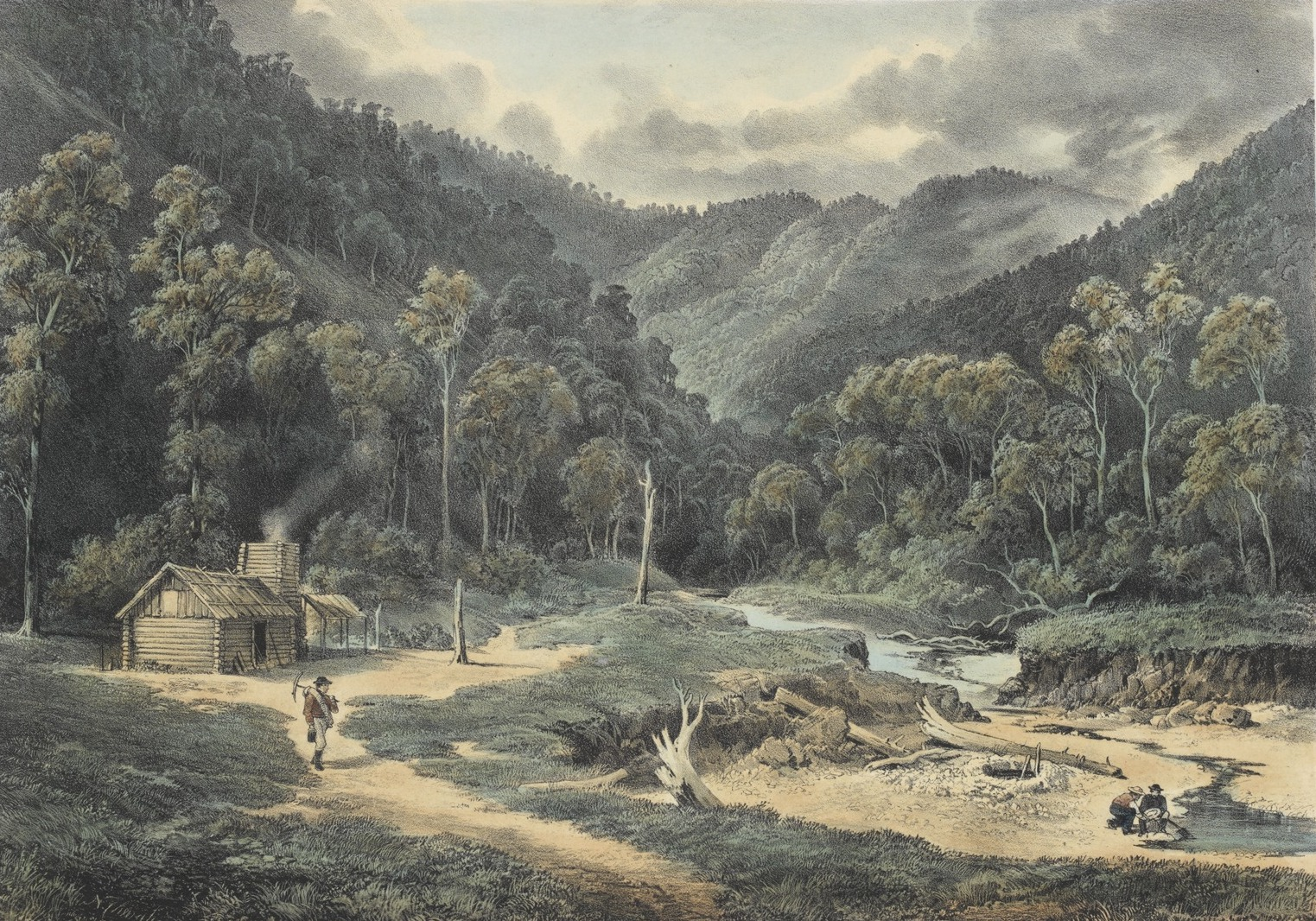
Wentworth River Diggings

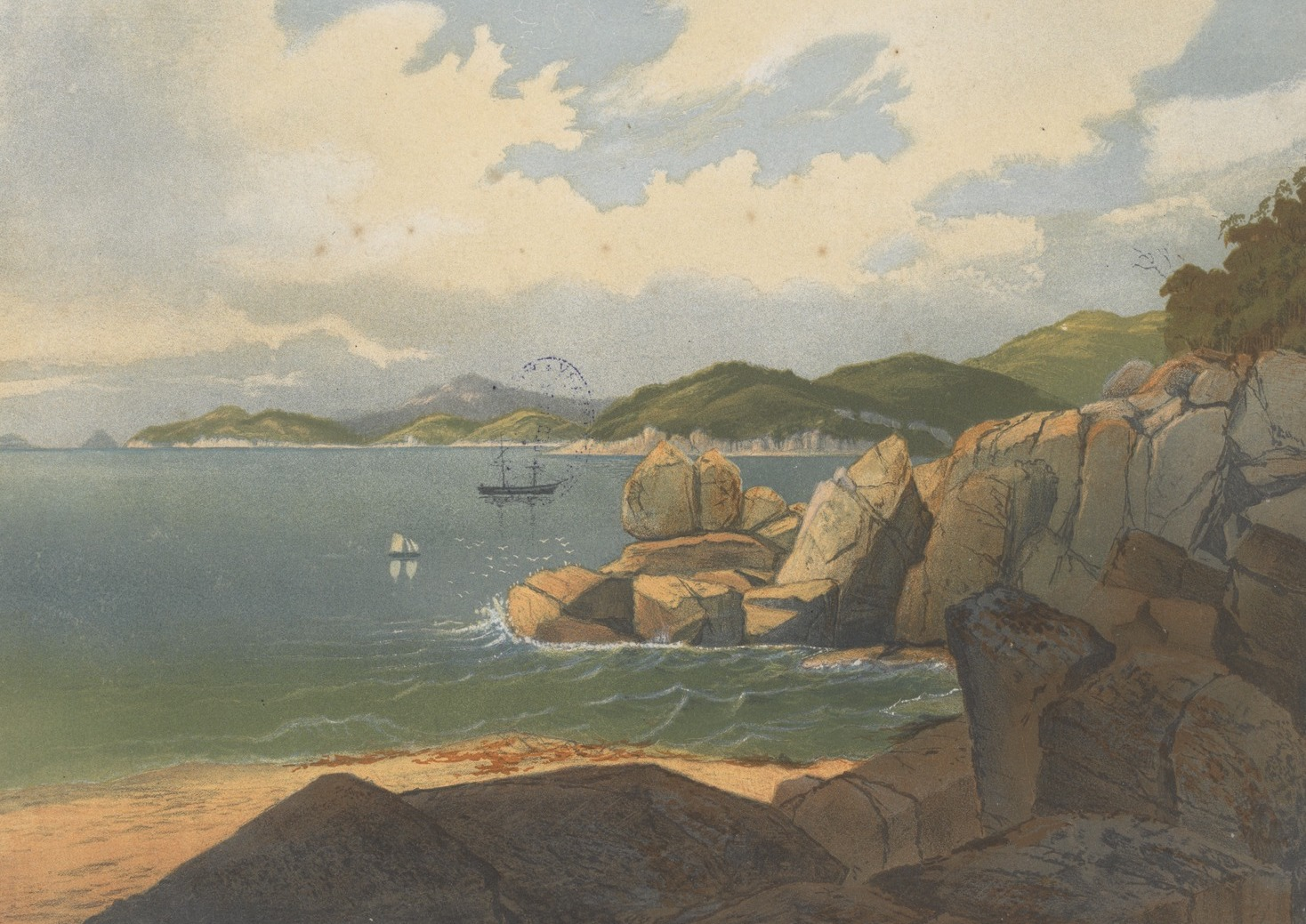
Refuge Cove, Wilson Promontory

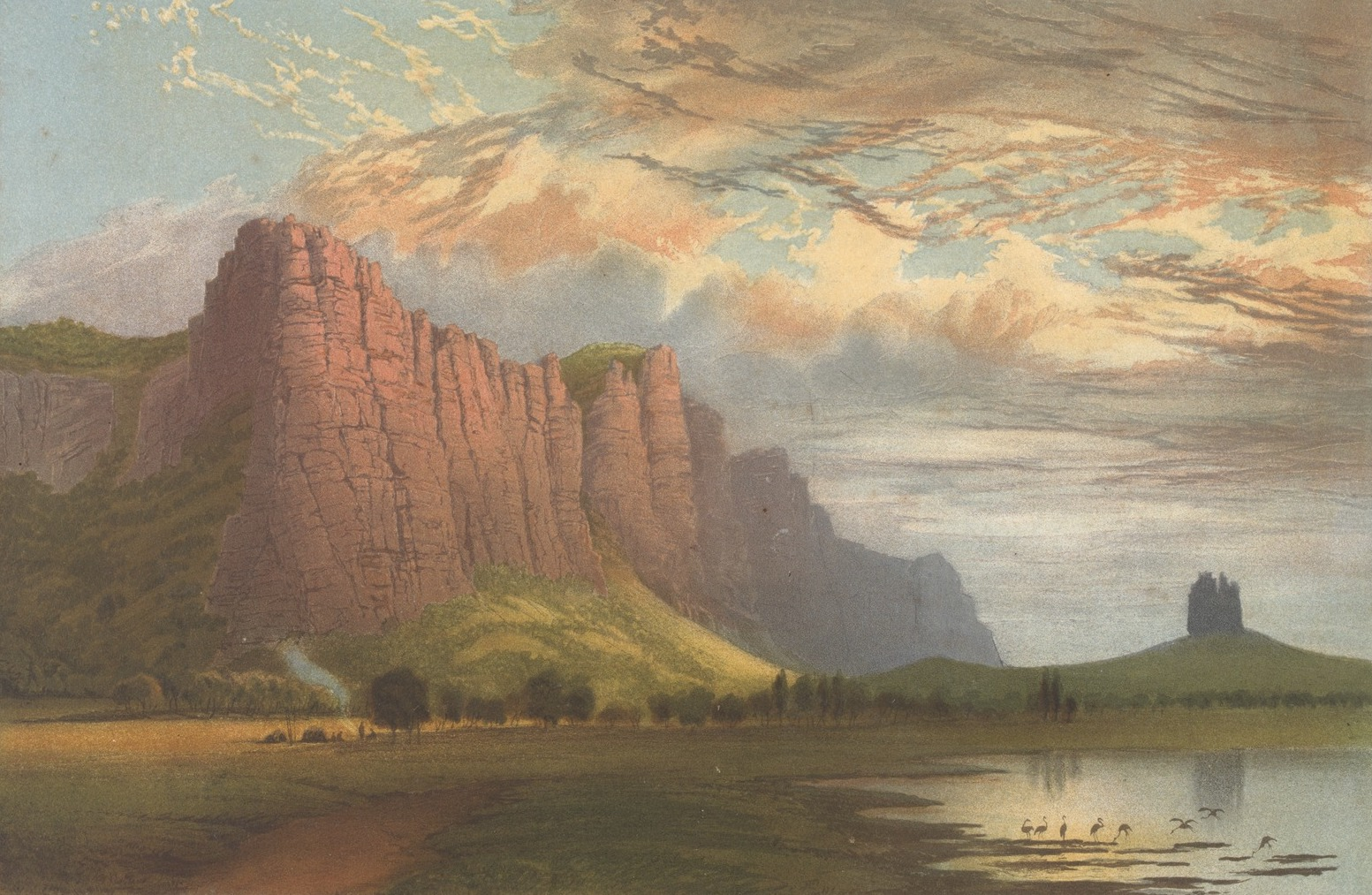
Mount Arapiles

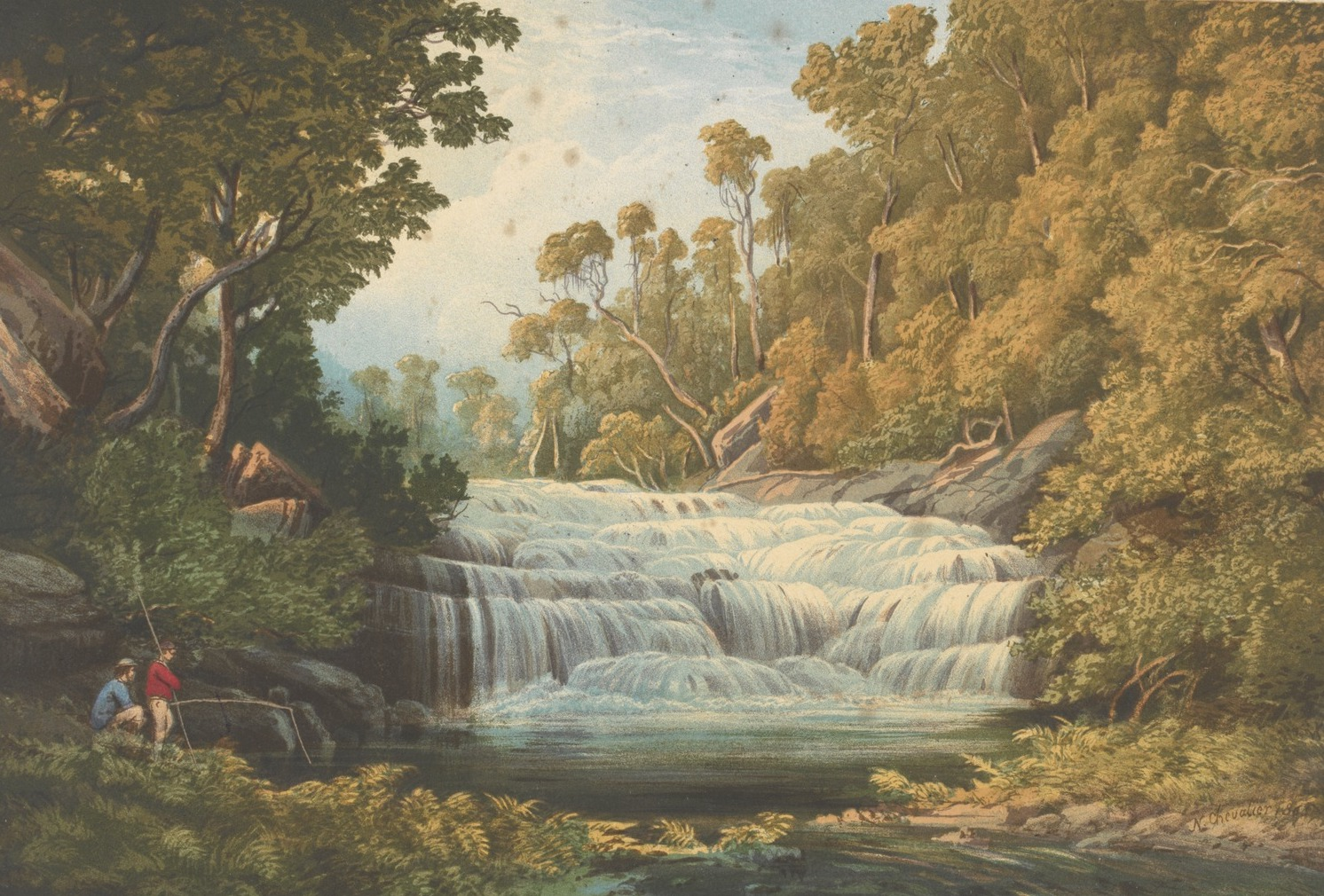
Parker's River Waterfall

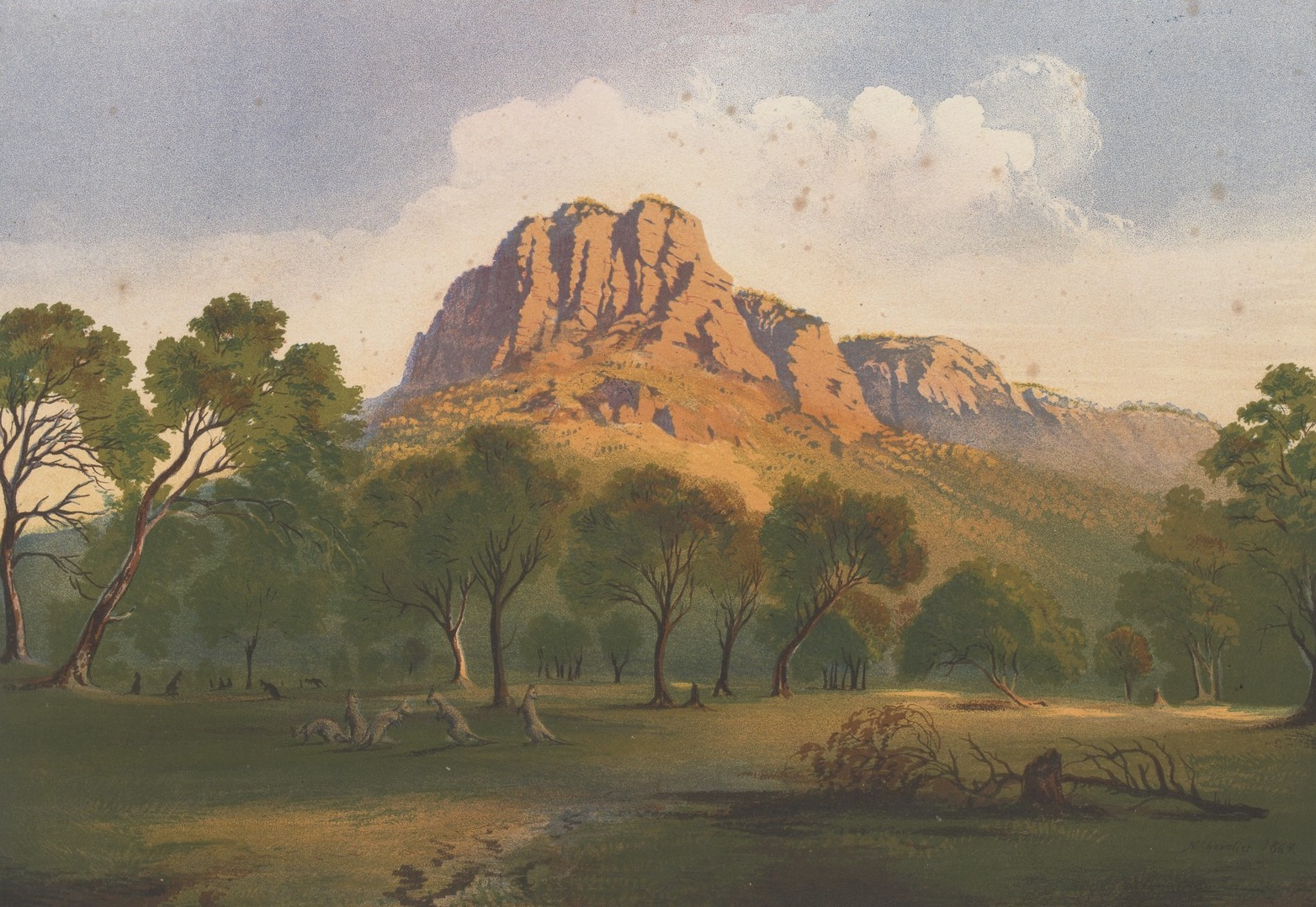
Mount Sturgeon
Images courtesy of Nicholas Chevalier, State Library Victoria
