= Santa Clara Valley Habitat Conservation Plan =

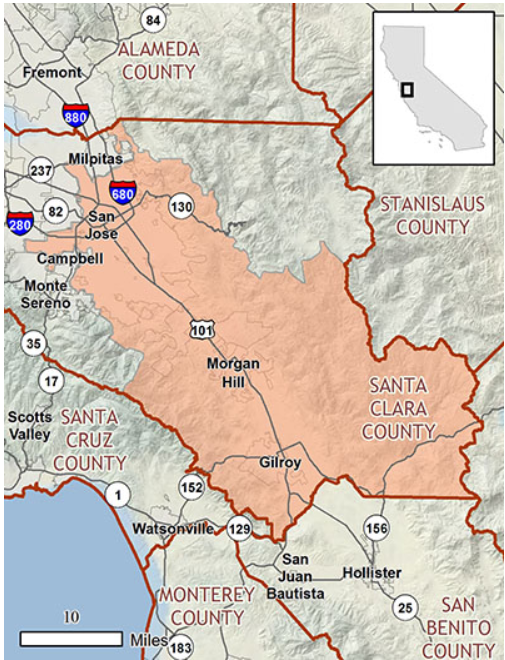
Map of the area the Santa Clara Valley Habitat Conservation Plan will cover.

The Santa Clara Valley Habitat Conservation Plan (SCVHCP), also known as the Santa Clara Valley Habitat Plan, is an initiative issued in 2012 by the County of Santa Clara, the City of San José, the City of Morgan Hill, the City of Gilroy, the Santa Clara Valley Water District (SCVWD), and the Santa Clara Valley Transportation Authority (VTA). These governmental agencies are collectively called the "Local Partners" in regards to the Santa Clara Valley Habitat Conservation Plan. The plan's goal is to protect and encourage the growth of endangered species in Santa Clara County. It is a 50-year plan, costing an estimated $660 million as of 2012.

== Background ==
In 2001, the U.S. Department of Fish and Wildlife Service recommended that the local agencies create a habitat conservation plan (HCP) which covered all or most of Santa Clara County to earn approval for other development projects, such as widening U.S. Highway 101. The USFWS suggested that an HCP is needed to mitigate the potential impact of urban development on federally protected species in the area. In 2004, Santa Clara County, the City of San Jose, VTA, and SCVWD signed a memorandum of understanding (MOU) which stated that the HCP or natural community conservation plan (NCCP) would protect multiple species and habitats. By 2005, the City of Gilroy and the City of Morgan Hill signed into the MOU, making them the fifth and sixth members of the Local Partners. In October 2005, the USFWS, CDFW, and the Local Partners signed the Planning Agreement. The Planning Agreement is the foundational work for the future HCP/NCCP. This Santa Clara Valley Habitat Conservation Plan states that the Planning Agreement had five main purposes: it sets goals, objectives, and obligations; estimated a preliminary geographic scope, natural, communities and species; required the Local Partners USFWS, and the CDFW to work together; made "concurrent" plans for wetlands; and "...established a process for inclusion of scientific input and public participation."

=== Compliance with Previous Environmental Policies ===
The Planning Agreement is designed to adhere to the Federal Endangered Species Act (ESA), the California Endangered Species Act (CESA), and the Natural Community Conservation Planning Act (NCCPA). The SCVHCP planned to satisfying the requirements in the ESA by specifying impact on federally protected species, creating a comprehensive plan on mitigation measures, designate funding to mitigation, create contingency plans, and explain why other, alternative methods are no longer deemed viable. The California Endangered Species Act, in regards to its application to the Santa Clara Valley Habitat Conservation Plan, address the act of taking CESA-listed threatened or endangered plants and animals. Section 86 of the California Fish and Game Code (FGC) define take as "hunt, pursue, catch, capture, or kill, or attempt to hunt, pursue, catch, capture, or kill." The SCVHCP is required to acknowledge instances of take by creating mitigation measures for potential impacts from take. To comply with the Natural Community Conservation Planning Act, the SCVHCP must "be consistent with the Planning Agreement" along with eight other findings.

=== Ordinances with Other Environmental Policies ===
The Santa Clara Valley Habitat Plan also had to comply with: the Migratory Bird Treaty Act; the Bald Eagle and Golden Eagle Protection Act; California Fish and Game Code Sections 3511, 4700, 5050, 5515; California Fish and Game Code Section 3503 and 3503.5; the National Environmental Policy Act of 1969; the California Environmental Quality Act of 1970; the Clean Water Act of 1972 Sections 401 and 404; the Porter-Cologne Water Quality Control Act; California Fish and Game Code Sections 1600–1616; and the National Historic Preservation Act.

=== List of Protected Species ===
Eighteen species are covered by the Santa Clara Valley Habitat Conservation Plan. There is one species of invertebrate, four species of amphibians or reptiles, three species of birds, and one species of mammal. Nine species of plants are covered by the SCVHCP.

Animals
Species Name
Bay Checkerspot Butterfly	Foothill Yellow-legged Frog	Tricolored Blackbird
California Tiger Salamander	Western Pond Turtle	Western Burrowing Owl
California Red-legged Frog	Least Bell's Vireo	San Joaquin Kit Fox

Plants
Species Name
Coyote Ceanothus	Metcalf Canyon Jewelflower	Santa Clara Valley Dudleya
Fragrant Fritillary	Most Beautiful Jewelflower	Smooth Lessingia
Loma Prieta Hoita	Mount Hamilton Thistle	Tiburon Indian Paintbrush

== Water Management ==
=== SCVHCP and the Three Creeks Habitat Conservation Plan ===
A main goal of the SCVHCP is to "preserve and enhance watersheds to protect beneficial uses of water and to provide flood protection for Santa Clara County." Because the protected areas overlap, the SCVHCP and the Three Creeks Habitat Conservation Plan. These overlapping areas are the Coyote Watershed, the Guadalupe Watershed, and the Stevens Creek Watershed. The SCVHP provides regulation in activities in these overlapping watersheds. Activities in the SCVHCP are describes as development projects divided into seven categories: "urban development, in-stream capital projects, in-stream operations and maintenance, rural capital projects, rural operation and maintenance, rural development, and conservation strategy implementation." The Three Creeks HCP contains a program for the "impacts of SCVWD's operation and maintenance of eight reservoirs, multiple diversions dams and drop structures and associated facilities...[and an] extensive system of off-channel recharge ponds, and facilities that provide for water to be released to various channels."
