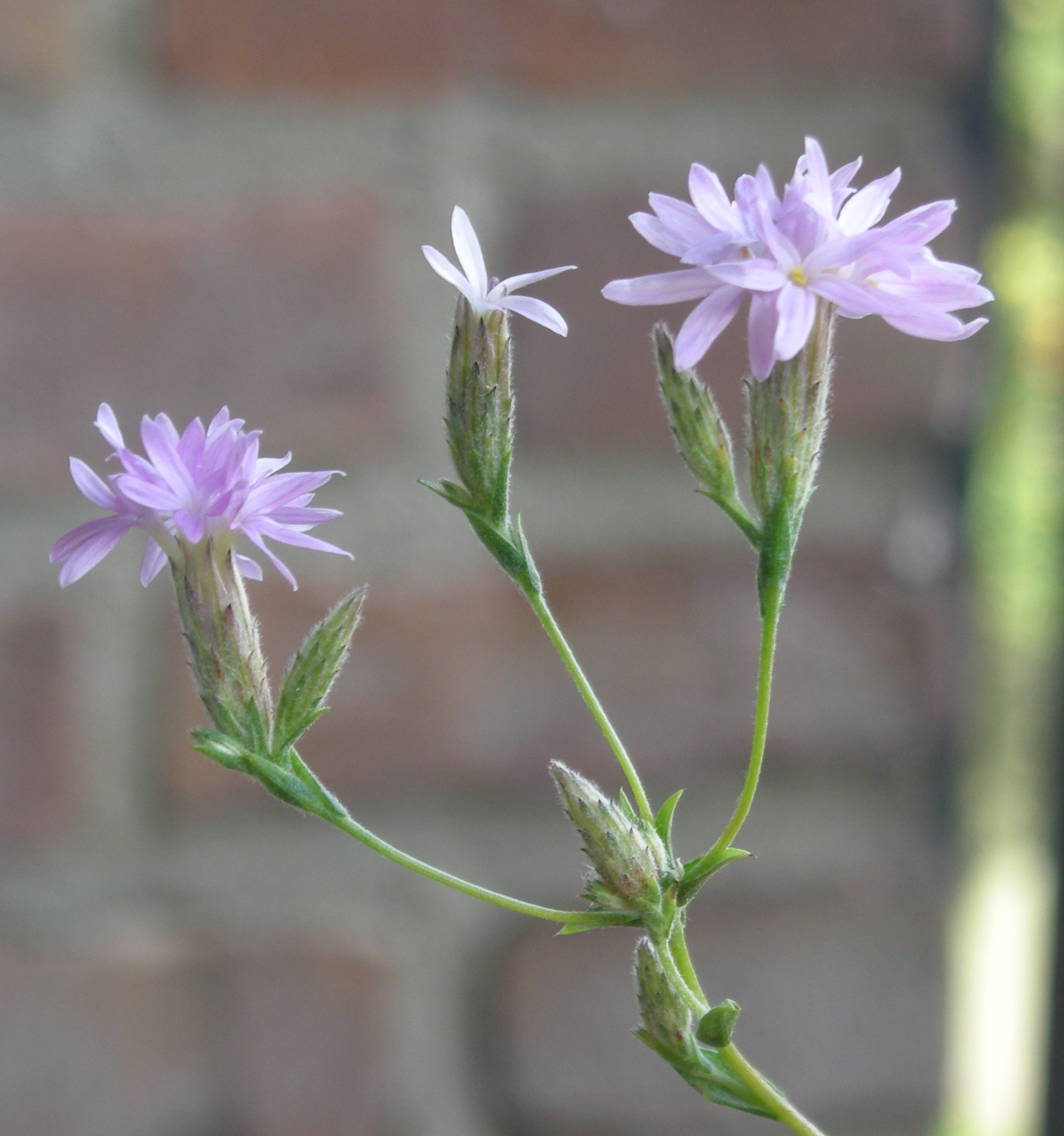
- Lessingia leptoclada

Scientific classification
- Kingdom: Plantae
- Clade: Tracheophytes
- Clade: Angiosperms
- Clade: Eudicots
- Clade: Asterids
- Order: Asterales
- Family: Asteraceae
- Subfamily: Asteroideae
- Tribe: Astereae
- Subtribe: Machaerantherinae
- Genus: Lessingia; Cham.

Type species
- Lessingia germanorum Cham.

= Lessingia =

Genus of flowering plants

Lessingia is a genus of plants in the family Asteraceae which are native to western North America. Several species are endemic to California.

Lessingias are generally daisy-like in appearance with white, yellow, or purple flowers, but they vary in appearance. Some lessingias are sometimes treated as members of different genera, such as Benitoa. The San Francisco lessingia, Lessingia germanorum, is an endangered species.

Species

Image	Scientific name	Distribution
	Lessingia arachnoidea - Crystal Springs lessingia	California (Sonoma, San Mateo, Santa Cruz Cos)
	Lessingia germanorum - San Francisco lessingia	California (San Mateo Co)
	Lessingia glandulifera - valley lessingia	California, Arizona, Nevada
	Lessingia hololeuca - woollyhead lessingia	California (from Yolo + Sonoma Cos to Monterey Co)
	Lessingia lemmonii - Lemmon's lessingia	Arizona, California
	Lessingia leptoclada - Sierra lessingia	California (from Plumas Co to Los Angeles Co)
	Lessingia micradenia - Mt. Tamalpais lessingia	California (Marin + Santa Clara Cos)
	Lessingia nana - dwarf lessingia	California (From Tehama Co to Kern Co)
	Lessingia nemaclada - slenderstem lessingia	California (From Siskiyou Co to Kern Co)
	Lessingia pectinata - Sonoma lessingia	California (From San Bernardino Co to Contra Costa + El Dorado Cos)
	Lessingia ramulosa	California (From Tehama Co to Marin Co)
	Lessingia tenuis - spring lessingia	California (From Ventura Co to Alameda Co)
	Lessingia virgata - wand lessingia	California (From Fresno Co to Shasta Co)

Formerly included

Some species once regarded as part of Lessingia are now considered more suited to other genera: Artemisia, Benitoa, Cacalia, Chrysolaena, Corethrogyne, Lessingianthus, Vernonia.
