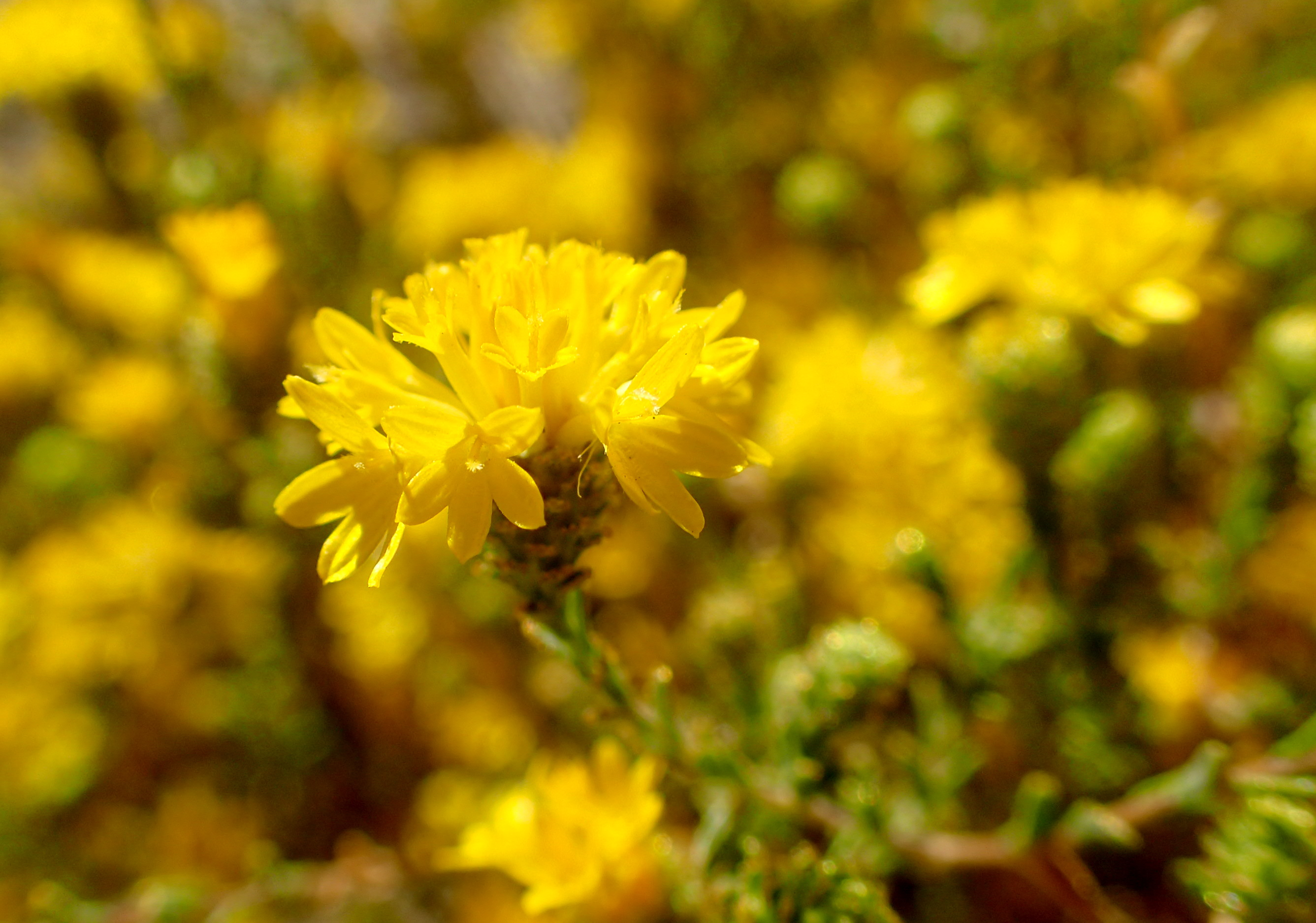
- Lessingia glandulifera var. glandulifera

Scientific classification
- Kingdom: Plantae
- Clade: Tracheophytes
- Clade: Angiosperms
- Clade: Eudicots
- Clade: Asterids
- Order: Asterales
- Family: Asteraceae
- Genus: Lessingia
- Species: L. glandulifera

Binomial name
- Lessingia glandulifera A.Gray

= Lessingia glandulifera =

Species of flowering plant

Lessingia glandulifera is a species of flowering plant in the family Asteraceae known by the common name valley lessingia. It is native to California and Baja California, where it grows in several types of habitat, from forest and desert to the coastline. This is an annual herb varying in maximum size from under 10 to nearly 80 centimeters in height, growing erect to decumbent. It is hairless to very hairy and glandular. The leaves are widely lance-shaped and toothed, the lowest approaching 11 centimeters in maximum length. The upper leaves are often studded with knobby glands. The flower heads appear singly at the tips of the stem branches. Each head is lined with phyllaries covered in large glands and sometimes many hairs. The head is discoid, containing no ray florets but many funnel-shaped disc florets with lobes that resemble ray florets. The disc florets are yellow with brown throats. The fruit is an achene with a whitish pappus.
