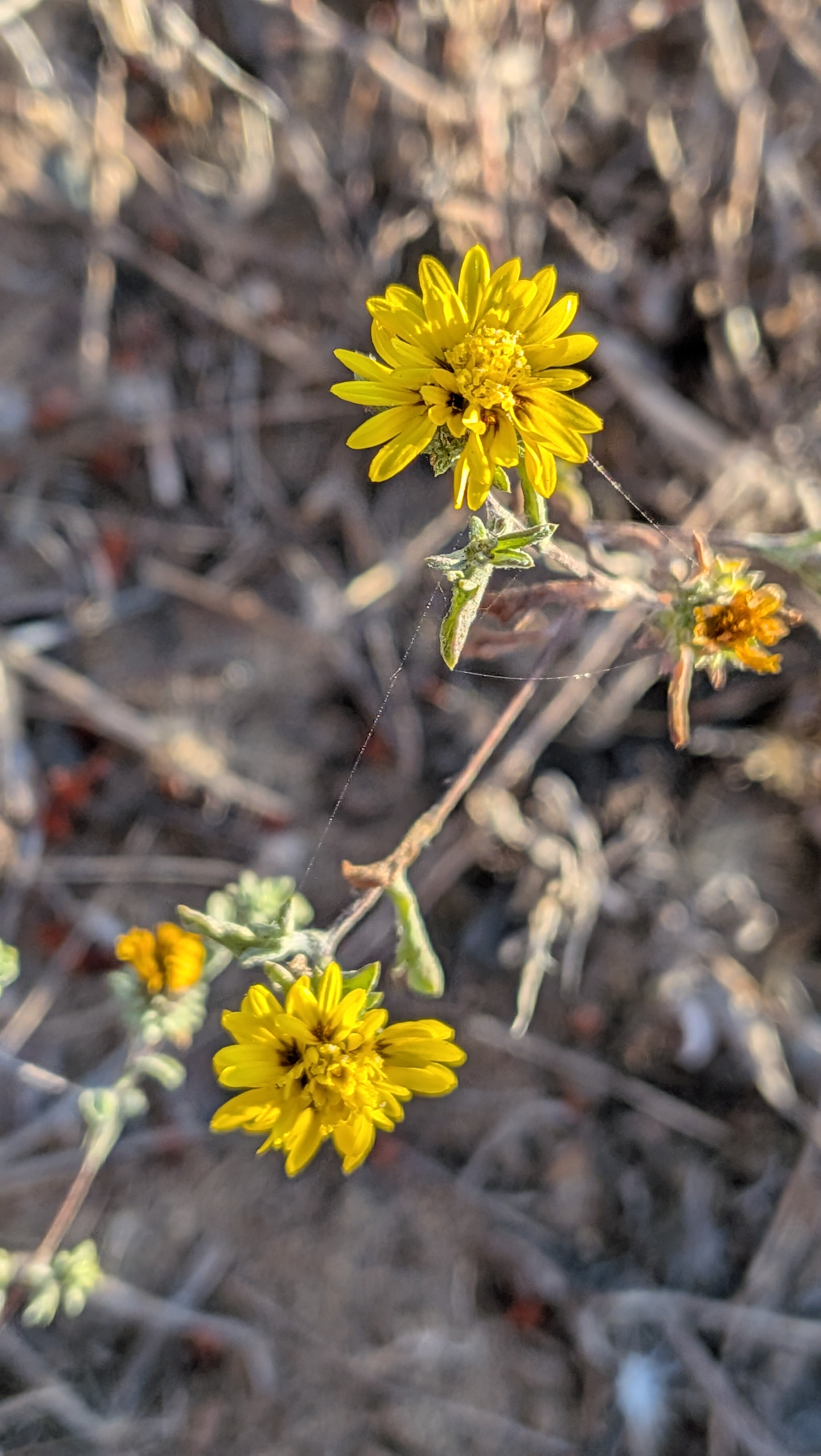

Conservation status
- Endangered (ESA)

Scientific classification
- Kingdom: Plantae
- Clade: Embryophytes
- Clade: Tracheophytes
- Clade: Angiosperms
- Clade: Eudicots
- Clade: Asterids
- Order: Asterales
- Family: Asteraceae
- Genus: Lessingia
- Species: L. germanorum

Binomial name
- Lessingia germanorum Cham.

= Lessingia germanorum =

Species of flowering plant

Lessingia germanorum is a rare species of flowering plant in the family Asteraceae known by the common name San Francisco lessingia. It is endemic to California, where it is known from four populations in the Presidio of San Francisco and one occurrence on San Bruno Mountain south of San Francisco. It is a state and federally listed endangered species. The already rare plant is endangered by many processes, including invasive species, development, sand mining, off-road vehicles and bulldozers, habitat fragmentation, trampling, and pollution, as well as stochastic events.

This is an annual herb producing a decumbent to erect, reddish stem no more than 30 centimeters long. The deeply lobed leaves are up to 3 or 4 centimeters long. Some leaves and new stem parts are coated in woolly fibers. The inflorescence is a solitary flower head or cluster of heads at the tip of the stem. The bell-shaped involucre is lined with pointed phyllaries that curl back as the head matures. The head is discoid, with no ray florets but several tubular golden disc florets with raylike lobes. The plant blooms in July through November. The fruit is an achene with a whitish pappus.

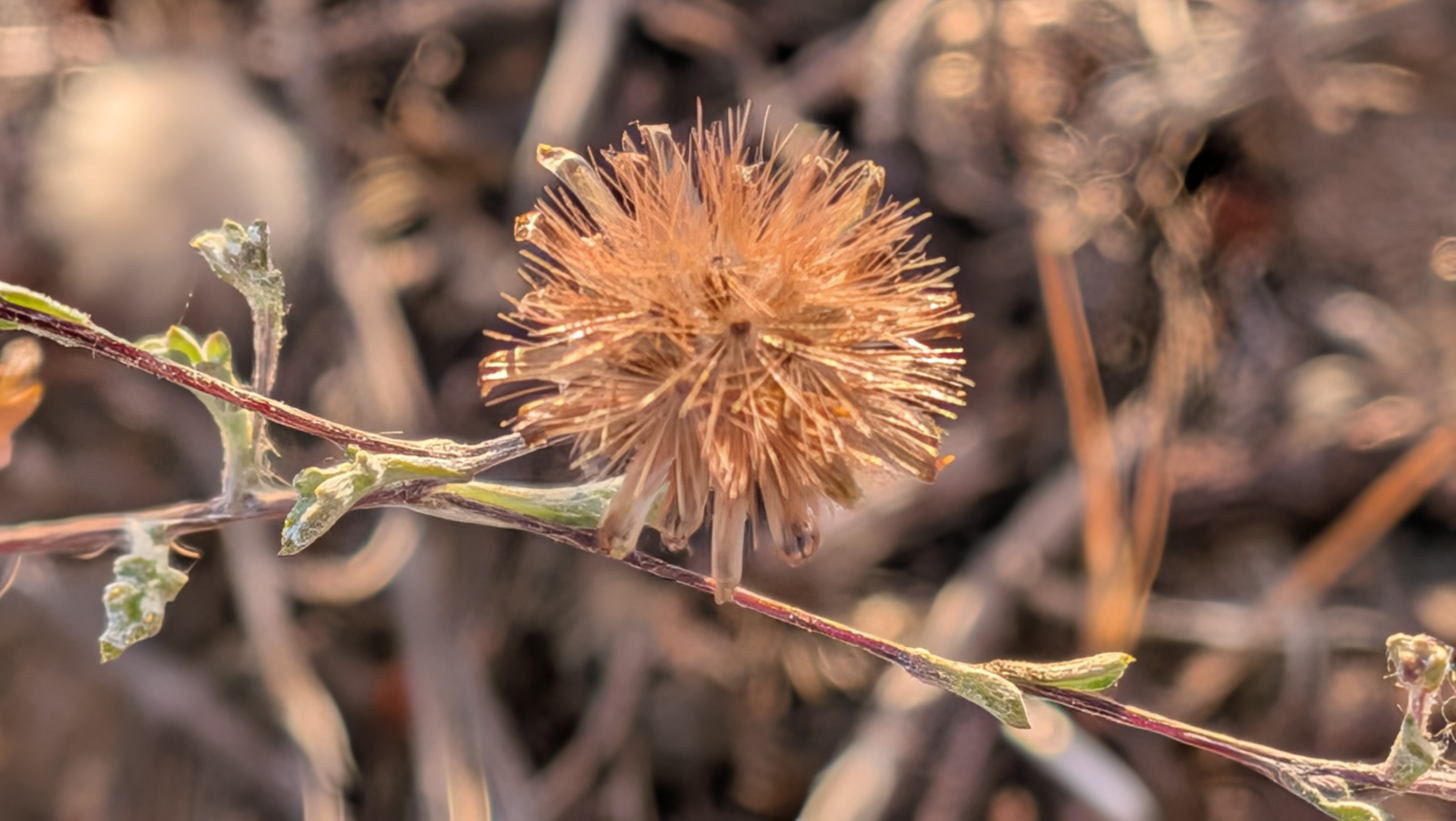
Lessingia germanorum seeds

This plant grows in beach sand dunes and scrub and similar sandy habitat. It is native to the tip of the San Francisco Peninsula, a land mass which is intensely developed and urbanized. The single population known on San Bruno Mountain near Daly City was discovered in 1989 and is threatened by the construction of houses in the immediate vicinity. The largest population of the plants is in the dunes at the mouth of Lobos Creek in the San Francisco Presidio. Habitat in the area is infested with non-native species such as ice plant (Carpobrotus sp.), which produces mats of herbage over the sand dunes, stabilizing the sand; the lessingia requires shifting, windblown sand habitat. Introduced trees have also altered the habitat of the lessingia. Old Monterey cypress (Cupressus macrocarpa) and Monterey pine (Pinus radiata) planted many decades ago remain in the Presidio dunes; these native California trees are not native to this particular ecosystem, and have become detrimental.
