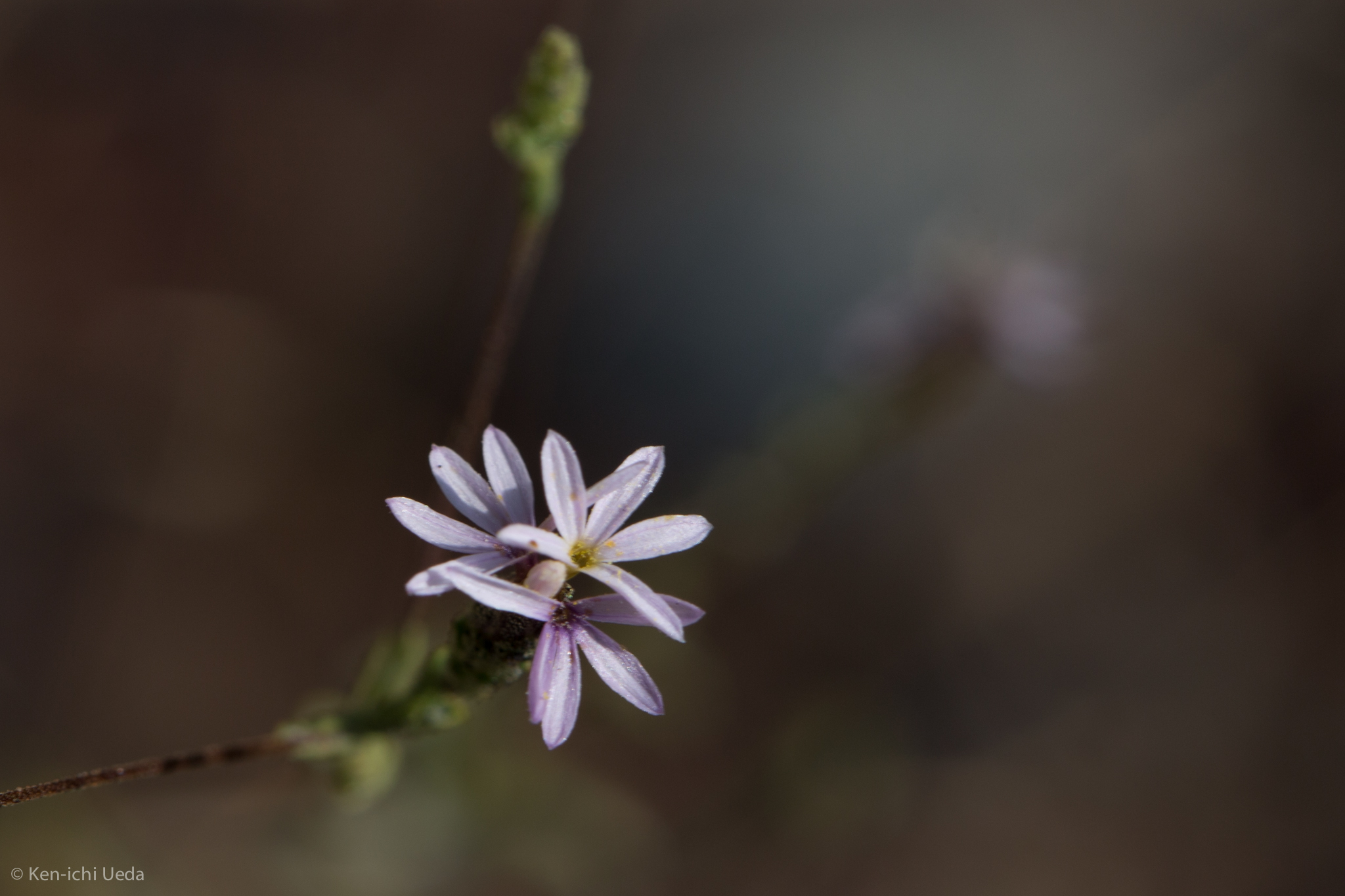

Scientific classification
- Kingdom: Plantae
- Clade: Tracheophytes
- Clade: Angiosperms
- Clade: Eudicots
- Clade: Asterids
- Order: Asterales
- Family: Asteraceae
- Genus: Lessingia
- Species: L. nemaclada

Binomial name
- Lessingia nemaclada Greene

= Lessingia nemaclada =

Species of flowering plant

Lessingia nemaclada is a species of flowering plant in the family Asteraceae known by the common name slenderstem lessingia. It is endemic to California, where it is widespread across the northern parts of the Central Valley and adjacent foothills and mountains, including the Sierra Nevada foothills and the mountains of the San Francisco Bay Area. It grows in a variety of habitats. This annual herb is quite variable in appearance. It may be petite and just a few centimeters tall, or over half a meter in erect height with many spreading branches. It is generally glandular, with knobby glands most easily seen on the leaves, and often hairy to woolly. The upper leaves are small and unlobed, and the lower leaves are larger and sometimes lobed or toothed but wither early. The flower heads appear singly or in small clusters. Each head is lined with hairless, glandular phyllaries. The head is discoid, containing no ray florets and just a few pale purple, pinkish, or nearly white funnel-shaped disc florets with narrow lobes. The fruit is an achene with a whitish pappus of bristles which may be fused into points.
