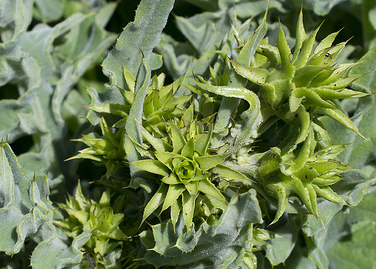
- Cirsium fontinale var. obispoense

Conservation status
- Endangered (ESA)

Scientific classification
- Kingdom: Plantae
- Clade: Embryophytes
- Clade: Tracheophytes
- Clade: Spermatophytes
- Clade: Angiosperms
- Clade: Eudicots
- Clade: Asterids
- Order: Asterales
- Family: Asteraceae
- Genus: Cirsium
- Species: C. fontinale

Binomial name
- Cirsium fontinale (Greene) Jeps.

Synonyms
- Carduus fontinalis (Greene) Greene; Cnicus fontinalis Greene; Cirsium campylon H.Sharsm.

= Cirsium fontinale =

Species of flowering plant

Cirsium fontinale, the fountain thistle, is a flowering perennial herb in the family Asteraceae. It is endemic to California. The genus Cirsium is commonly known as the "thistle" genus, Cirsium being the Greek word for 'thistle.'

== Distribution ==
The species is endemic to limited regions within northern and central California, at elevations not exceeding 750 metres (2,460 ft). Occurrences appear limited to serpentine seeps and streams within the California Coast Ranges, in areas of the San Francisco Bay Area and of San Luis Obispo County.

There are three recognized varieties of this species:

- Cirsium fontinale var. campylon — Mount Hamilton thistle; Diablo Range and southern Santa Clara Valley, San Francisco Bay Area. (Federal candidate for listing)
- Cirsium fontinale var. fontinale — Fountain thistle; San Mateo County. (Federal and State of California Endangered species)
- Cirsium fontinale var. obispoense — Chorro Creek bog thistle; San Luis Obispo County. (Federal and State of California Endangered species)

== Description ==
All the taxa within Cirsium fontinale have erect stems with leaves very strongly wavy margins. These tall plants may attain a height of 2.2 metres (7.2 ft), but may exist in the form of only 0.5 metres (1.6 ft). A given plant may have one or more stems, and the plants are sometimes short-lived, dying after flowering only once, even though the species is acknowledged to be perennial. Lower leaves are typically petioled or tapered, but mostly spiny-lobed; petioles are either spiny-lobed or toothed.

Inflorescences are characterized by prickly heads more or less grouped in a panicle-like cluster, closely subtended by the higher leaves. Involucres are either hemispheric or bell-shaped, with purple to green coloration. Phyllaries range from a lanceolate to ovate shape. There are characteristically many flowers with white, pink or lavender corollae about 20 millimeters in length.

Anther bases are sharply sagittate, with oblong tips; the ends of the styles manifest a somewhat swollen node, with a cylindrical superior appendage. The smooth brownish fruits are four to five millimeters in diameter, but distinctly ovoid; many pappus bristles are exhibited.

=== Varieties ===
The 3 varieties of Cirsium fontinale have specific limited distribution ranges, and distinctive features.

==== Cirsium fontinale var. campylon ====
Cirsium fontinale var. campylon, the Mount Hamilton thistle, is uncommon, but occurs in widely distributed locations in Santa Clara, Alameda and Stanislaus County, in the southeastern San Francisco Bay Area. Elevations of this variety are from 300–750 metres (980–2,460 ft) in the southern Santa Clara Valley and the Diablo Range, including Mount Hamilton.

As with the other species varieties, the Mount Hamilton thistle prefers moist areas on serpentine soil slopes including seeps, riparian stream environments, and other wetlands. The California Natural Diversity Database—CNDDB lists 39 location for this variety, of which 33 are in Santa Clara County, 3 are in Alameda County and 3 are in Stanislaus County. It is a candidate for listing on the federal endangered species list.

Description

Morphological differences of the C. f. var. campylon compared to other varieties of this species manifest first in a green stem which has a maximum height of 2 metres (6.6 ft). The leaves are densely tomentose and glandular hairs are not evident.

Compared to the other varieties, the flowering heads of C. f. var. campylon are strongly and permanently nodding; moreover, its outer phyllaries present a greenish color and have a length of 20 to 30 millimeters. The phyllaries are distinctly recurved and channeled, with the widest dimension below the middle; the upper phyllary element becoming a spine of three to five millimeters. Corolla tubes are five to six millimeters long with a throat of double the tube; lobes are four toe five millimeters and style branches are about the same size as lobes. Fruits are ovoid and smooth.

==== Cirsium fontinale var. fontinale ====
Cirsium fontinale var. fontinale, the fountain thistle, is endemic to the eastern Santa Cruz Mountains foothills within San Mateo County, in the southwestern San Francisco Bay Area. It is found at elevations of approximately 120 metres (390 ft), which implies a distribution on the lower slopes of the Montara Mountain Block, within the Santa Cruz Mountains foothills. Habitats are seeps, wetlands and riparian areas associated with serpentine soils.

The California Natural Diversity Database (CNDDB), maintained by the California Department of Fish and Game, lists 5 occurrences for this variety. However at two of these locations, in or near Edgewood County Park, plants have not been observed for several years, and these populations are presumed extinct. One colony of C. f. var. fontinale was found in the 1980s on serpentine soil along the east side of Upper Crystal Springs Reservoir. A new population was found along a creek in Redwood City within Stulsaft Park in the 2000s. Another population was found in the Town of Woodside, growing on PG&E land on the east side of I-280 between Woodside Road and Farm Hill Blvd. along a perennial stream, while conducting a vegetation survey to replacing their L-109 gas pipeline. Historically this variety occurred in a broader range throughout San Mateo and Santa Clara Counties.

This fontinale variety of Cirsium fontinale was the first to be listed as endangered by the state of California (July, 1979). It is also a federal listed endangered species.

Description

The stem of Cirsium fontinale var. fontinale is generally less than 1.3 metres (4.3 ft) in height, and reddish in color. Leaves are distinctly glandular and thinly tomentose.

The inflorescence heads are generally nodding when in bloom, but typically are erect in the fruiting stage. The outer reddish phyllaries are 15 to 20 millimeters in size, and are somewhat recurved: these structures are wider above the middle, but abruptly tipped with a one to two millimeter spine. The corolla tube extends 10 millimeters, with a throat dimension of five to six millimeters and lobes approximately the same size; the style branches have a dimension of three to four millimeters. The ovoid fruits are smooth, and chromosomes are characterized as: 2n=34 +1.

==== Cirsium fontinale var. obispoense ====
Cirsium fontinale var. obispoense, the Chorro Creek bog thistle, occurs only in limited portions of the Santa Lucia Mountains, of the outer southern California Coast Ranges within San Luis Obispo County in central California. Its occurrence is principally associated with Chorro Creek.

The CNDDB lists 13 occurrences for this variety. As with the other varieties it prefers riparian or seep areas, typically on slopes. It is found at elevations less than 300 metres (980 ft). The Chorro Creek bog thistle was listed as a federally endangered species in 1994 and is classified as endangered for its entire range.

Description

The green to purplish stem of C. f. var. obispoense is always less than 2 metres (6.6 ft) in height, producing densely tomentose leaves, particularly for lower surfaces. When in bloom, the flowering heads have a nodding habit, but at the fruiting stage, they are erect.

The plant's outer green to dark purple phyllaries are of dimension 15 to 20 millimeters; moreover these structures are strongly recurved and somewhat channeled, with the upper half tapering to a one to four millimeter spine. The corolla tube of Chorro Creek bog thistle is seven millimeters in size with a throat ever so slightly larger; the lobes are approximately five millimeters and the style branches of approximately the same scale. Fruits are smooth, ovoid and minutely scabrous above.
