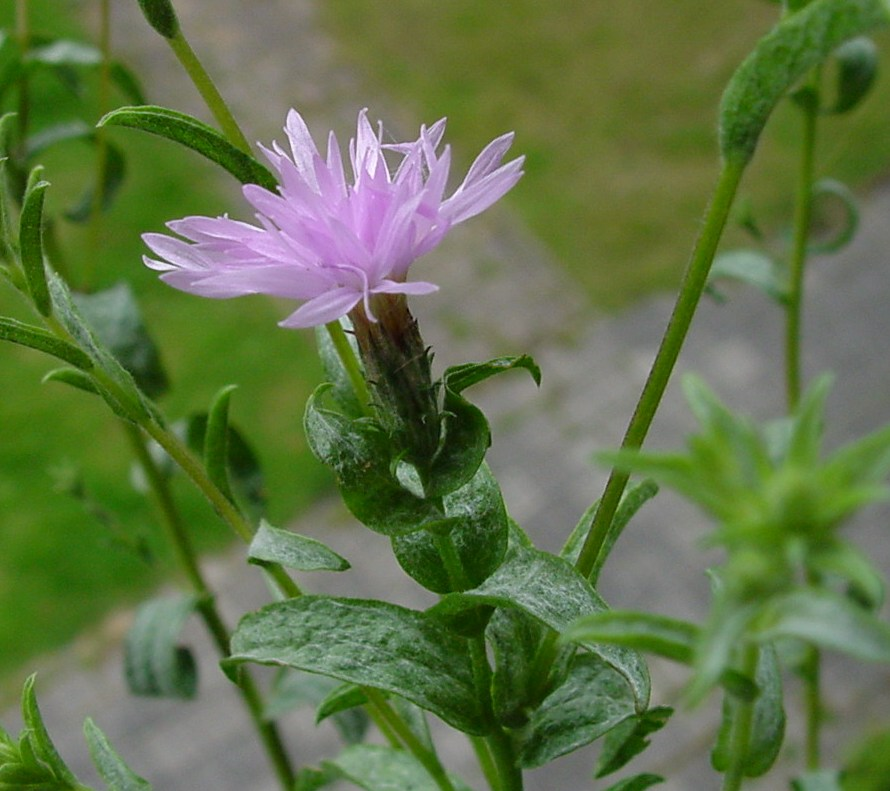

Scientific classification
- Kingdom: Plantae
- Clade: Tracheophytes
- Clade: Angiosperms
- Clade: Eudicots
- Clade: Asterids
- Order: Asterales
- Family: Asteraceae
- Genus: Lessingia
- Species: L. leptoclada

Binomial name
- Lessingia leptoclada A.Gray

= Lessingia leptoclada =

Species of flowering plant

Lessingia leptoclada is a species of flowering plant in the family Asteraceae known by the common name sierra lessingia. It is endemic to the Sierra Nevada of California, where it is known from several types of local habitat. This is a slender annual herb growing erect and varying in size from just a few centimeters to nearly a meter tall, with long, spreading branches. It is very glandular and often hairy or woolly in texture. The upper leaves are up to 5 centimeters (2.0 in) long, narrow and sometimes toothed or lobed; the lower leaves are longer and wither early. The flower heads appear singly or in small clusters. Each head is lined with woolly phyllaries. The head is discoid, containing no ray florets but many funnel-shaped pinkish, lavender, or light bluish-purple disc florets with large lobes. The fruit is an achene with a whitish pappus of bristles.
