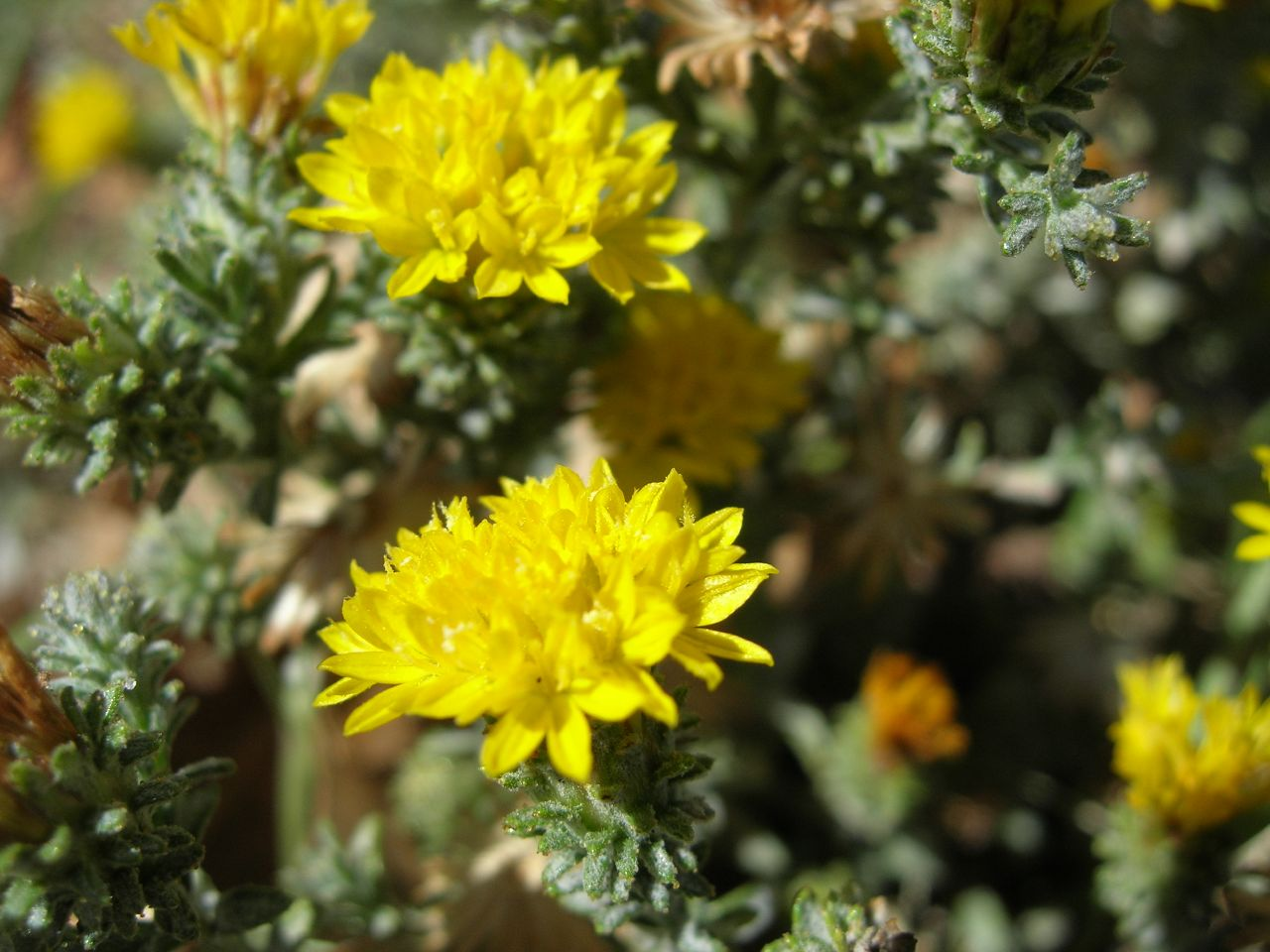

Scientific classification
- Kingdom: Plantae
- Clade: Tracheophytes
- Clade: Angiosperms
- Clade: Eudicots
- Clade: Asterids
- Order: Asterales
- Family: Asteraceae
- Genus: Lessingia
- Species: L. lemmonii

Binomial name
- Lessingia lemmonii A.Gray

= Lessingia lemmonii =

Species of flowering plant

Lessingia lemmonii is a species of flowering plant in the family Asteraceae known by the common name Lemmon's lessingia. It is native to the western United States around the intersection of Nevada, Arizona, and California, where it grows in desert and other habitat with sandy soils. This is an annual herb producing gray-green woolly stems in a low clump just a few centimeters high to a relatively erect 40 centimeters tall. The leaves are narrow and small, under 2 centimeters long, with much larger leaves appearing around the base of the young plant and withering away early. The flower heads appear singly or in open arrays. Each head has a bell- to bullet-shaped involucre lined with hairy to woolly phyllaries. The head is discoid, containing no ray florets but many funnel-shaped yellow disc florets with long lobes. The florets often have white markings in the throats. The fruit is an achene with a whitish or brownish pappus of bristles.
