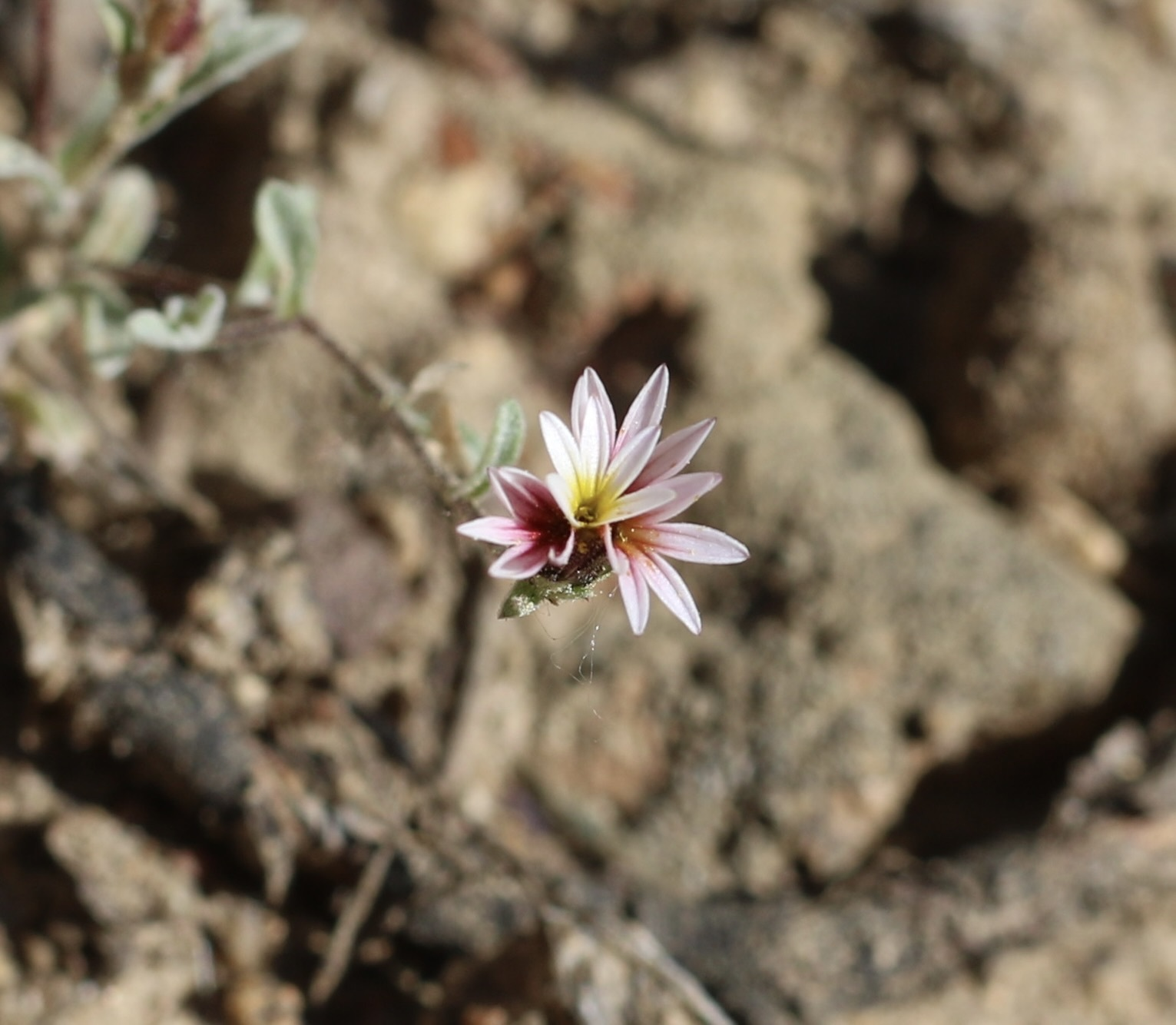

Scientific classification
- Kingdom: Plantae
- Clade: Tracheophytes
- Clade: Angiosperms
- Clade: Eudicots
- Clade: Asterids
- Order: Asterales
- Family: Asteraceae
- Genus: Lessingia
- Species: L. tenuis

Binomial name
- Lessingia tenuis (A.Gray) Coville

= Lessingia tenuis =

Species of flowering plant

Lessingia tenuis is a species of flowering plant in the family Asteraceae known by the common name spring lessingia. It is endemic to California, where it is known from the San Francisco Bay Area to Ventura County. It grows on the slopes of the California Coast Ranges in common local habitat such as chaparral.

== Description ==
This is an annual herb producing mainly erect stems up to about 15 centimeters tall. The small leaves are often divided into lobes or toothed, the largest no more than 4 centimeters long. The plant is hairy in texture and varies in color from grayish green to reddish or brown.

The flower heads appear singly at the tips of stem branches, each lined with purplish, glandular phyllaries. The head is discoid, containing no ray florets but many funnel-shaped disc florets with long, narrow lobes. These disc florets are usually yellow, but some plants bear white or pink colouration in certain populations. The corolla is generally yellow in most of the disc florets, one diagnostic separating other white and pink species such as L. nemaclada, but some outer florets may have a corolla that is dark purple, especially in white or pink flowering specimens.

The fruit is an achene with a whitish pappus of bristles.
