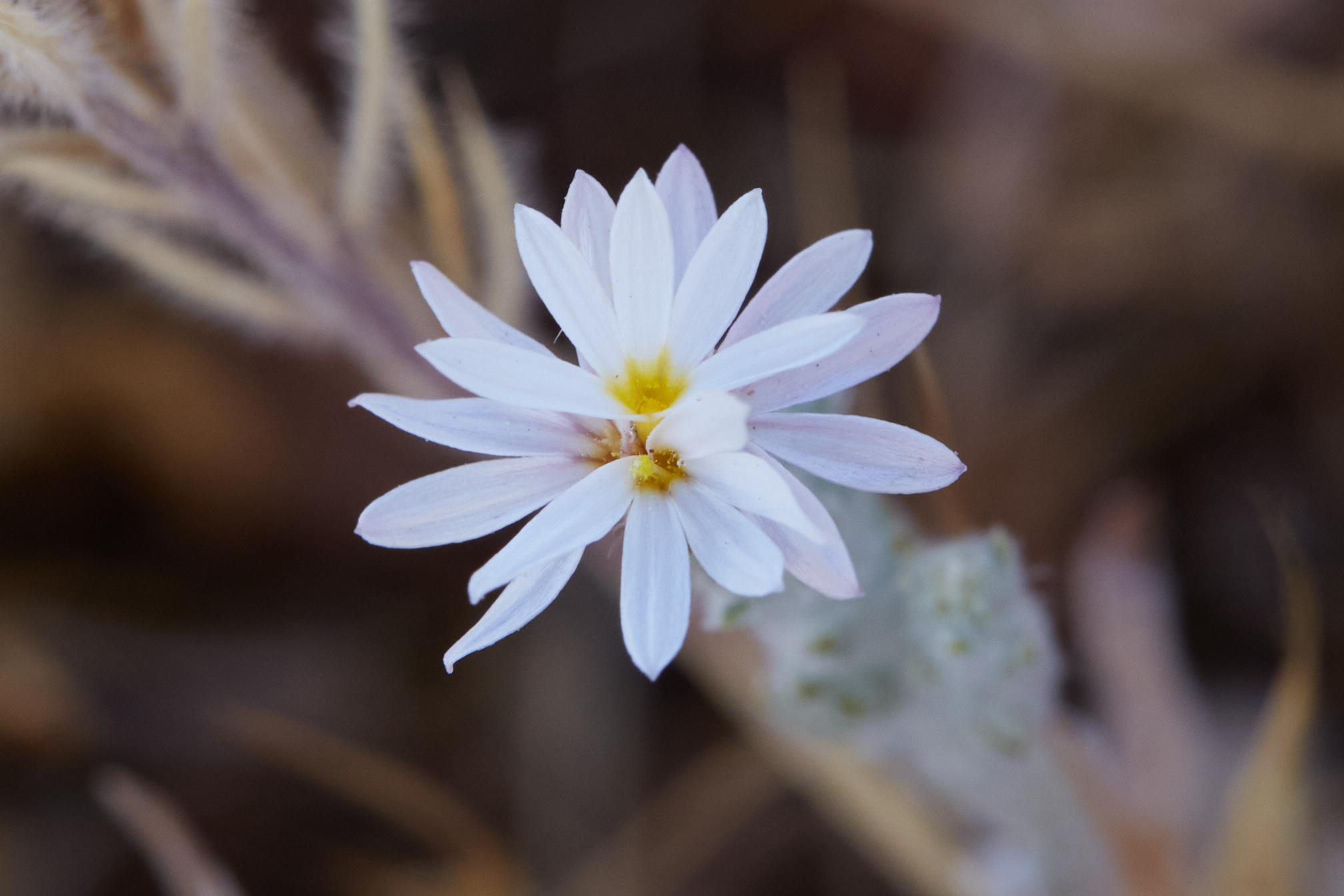

Scientific classification
- Kingdom: Plantae
- Clade: Tracheophytes
- Clade: Angiosperms
- Clade: Eudicots
- Clade: Asterids
- Order: Asterales
- Family: Asteraceae
- Genus: Lessingia
- Species: L. virgata

Binomial name
- Lessingia virgata A.Gray

= Lessingia virgata =

Species of flowering plant

Lessingia virgata is a species of flowering plant in the family Asteraceae known by the common name wand lessingia. It is endemic to California, where it is known from the eastern side of the Central Valley and adjacent Sierra Nevada foothills. It is a woolly, glandular annual herb growing up to about 60 centimeters tall with slender, spreading branches. The upper leaves are no more than a centimeter long, while the lower ones are longer and sometimes divided into lobes or teeth. The flower heads appear singly in leaf axils, each lined with purple-tipped, glandular, woolly phyllaries. The head is discoid, containing no ray florets but a few tubular light lavender to nearly white disc florets with long, narrow lobes. The fruit is an achene with a whitish pappus on top.
