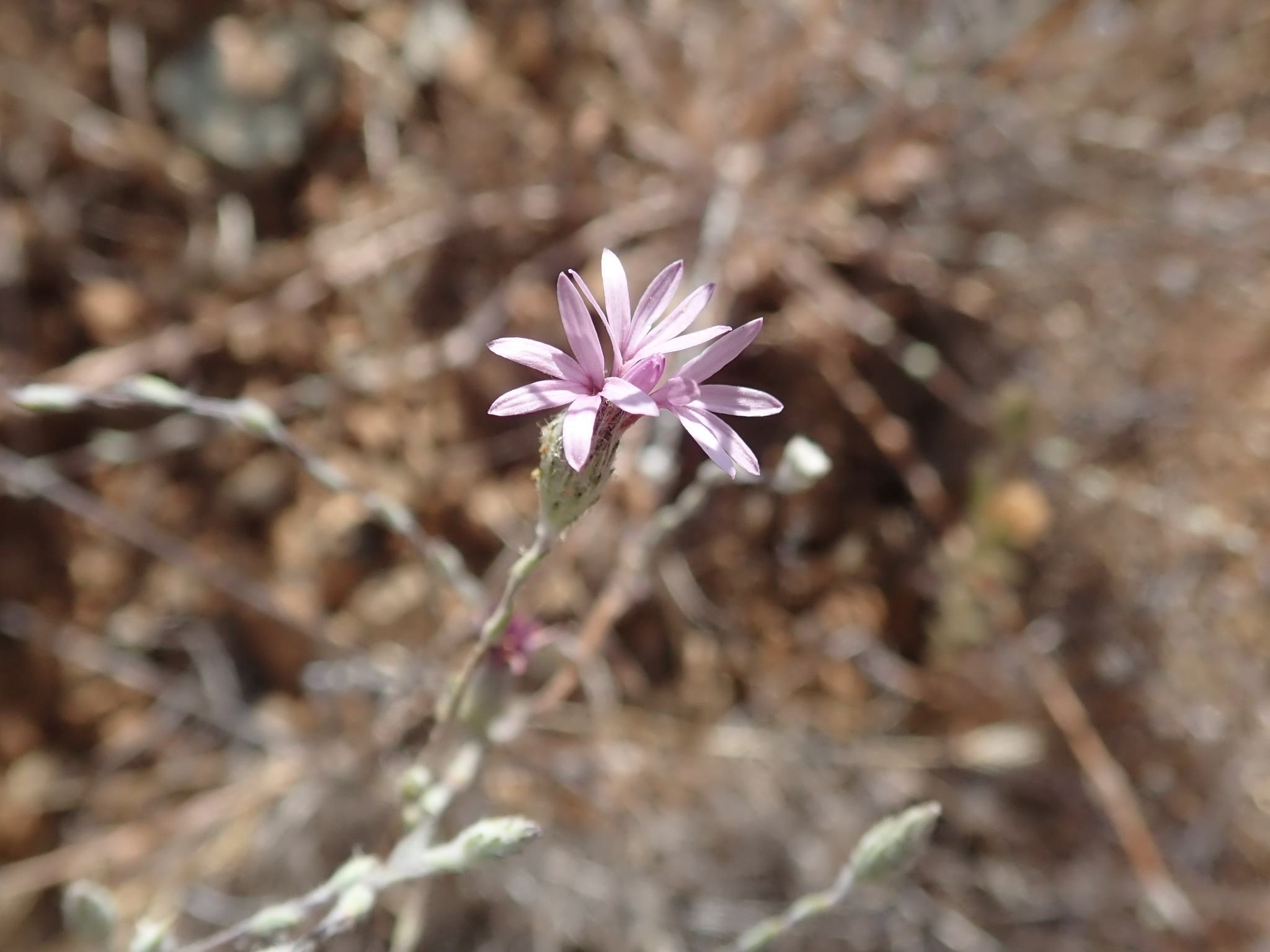

Scientific classification
- Kingdom: Plantae
- Clade: Tracheophytes
- Clade: Angiosperms
- Clade: Eudicots
- Clade: Asterids
- Order: Asterales
- Family: Asteraceae
- Genus: Lessingia
- Species: L. hololeuca

Binomial name
- Lessingia hololeuca Greene

= Lessingia hololeuca =

Species of flowering plant

Lessingia hololeuca is a species of flowering plant in the family Asteraceae known by the common name woollyhead lessingia.

== Distribution ==
It is endemic to California, where it is known from several locations around the San Francisco Bay Area and adjacent portions of the Sacramento Valley and North Coast Ranges. It grows in many types of local habitat.

== Description ==
Lessingia hololeuca is an annual herb varying in maximum size and shape from flat and just a few centimeters high to an erect 40 centimeters tall. It is mostly woolly in texture. The lower leaves approach 13 centimeters long and may have several deep lobes; the upper leaves much smaller and unlobed. The flower heads appear singly or in crowded clusters. Each head has a bullet-shaped involucre lined with woolly, purple-tipped phyllaries. The head is discoid, containing no ray florets but many funnel-shaped pink, lavender, or purple disc florets with lobes that resemble ray florets. The fruit is an achene with a whitish pappus of bristles.
