= Santa Clara Valley =

Valley in Northern California, United States

- Valle de Santa Clara (Spanish)
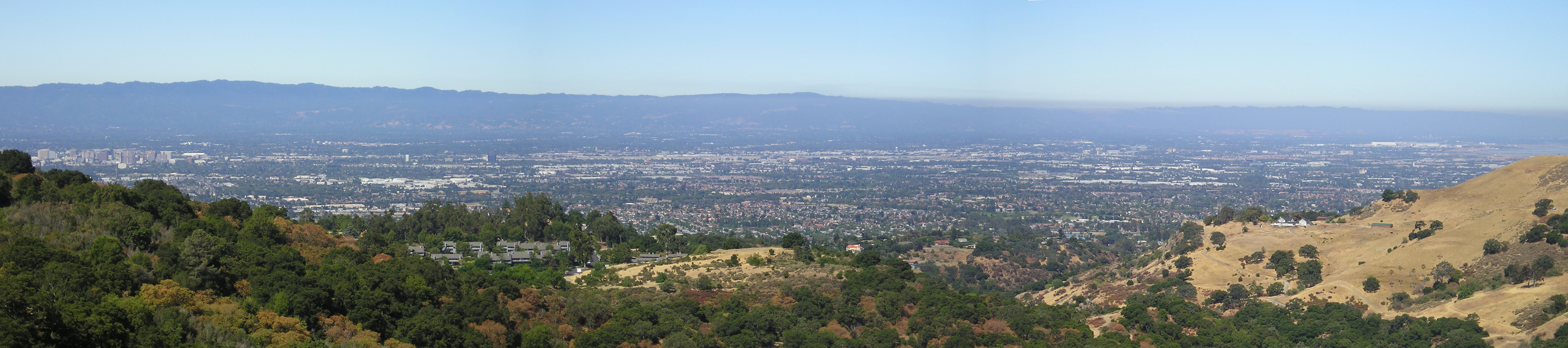
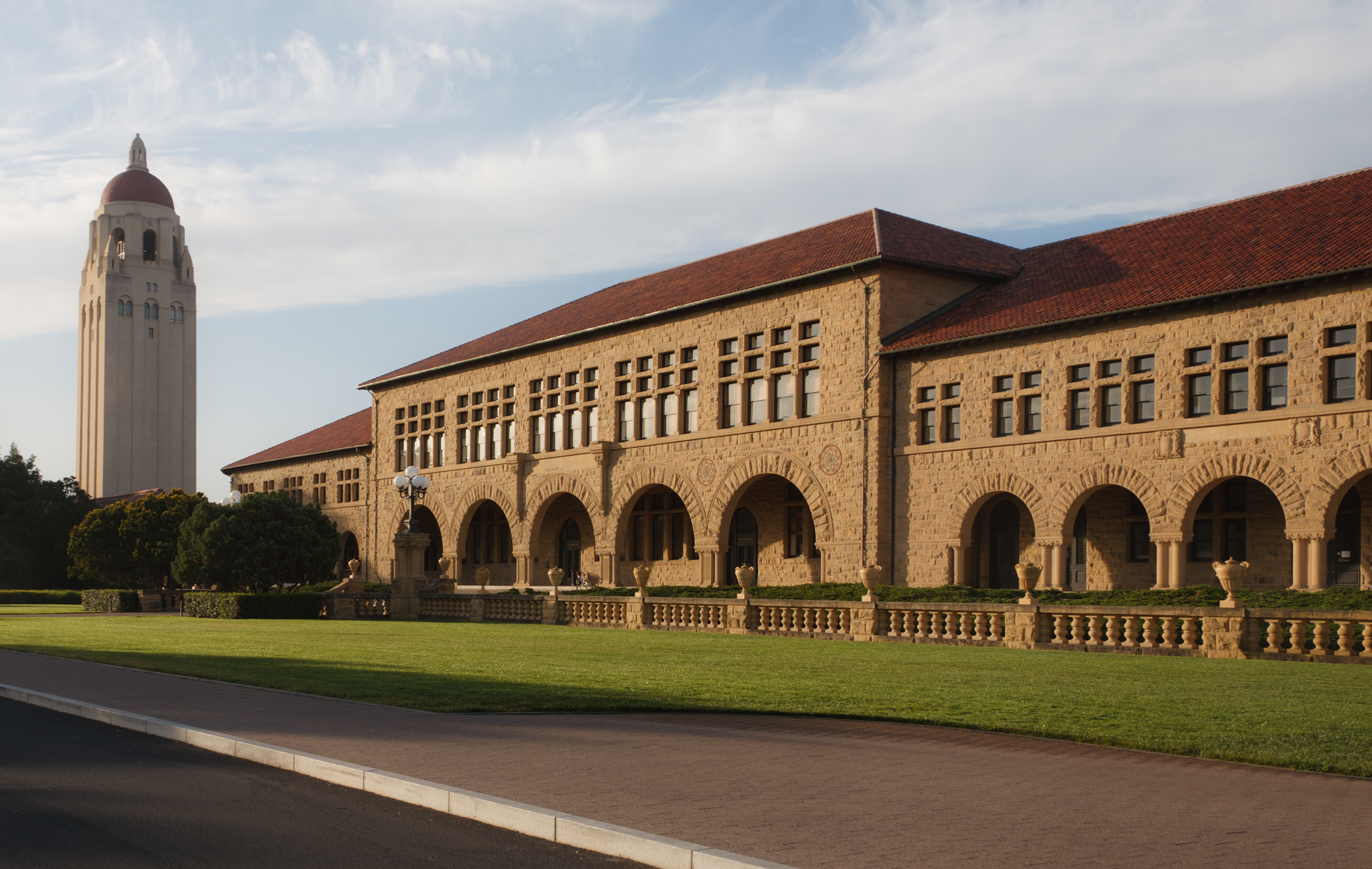
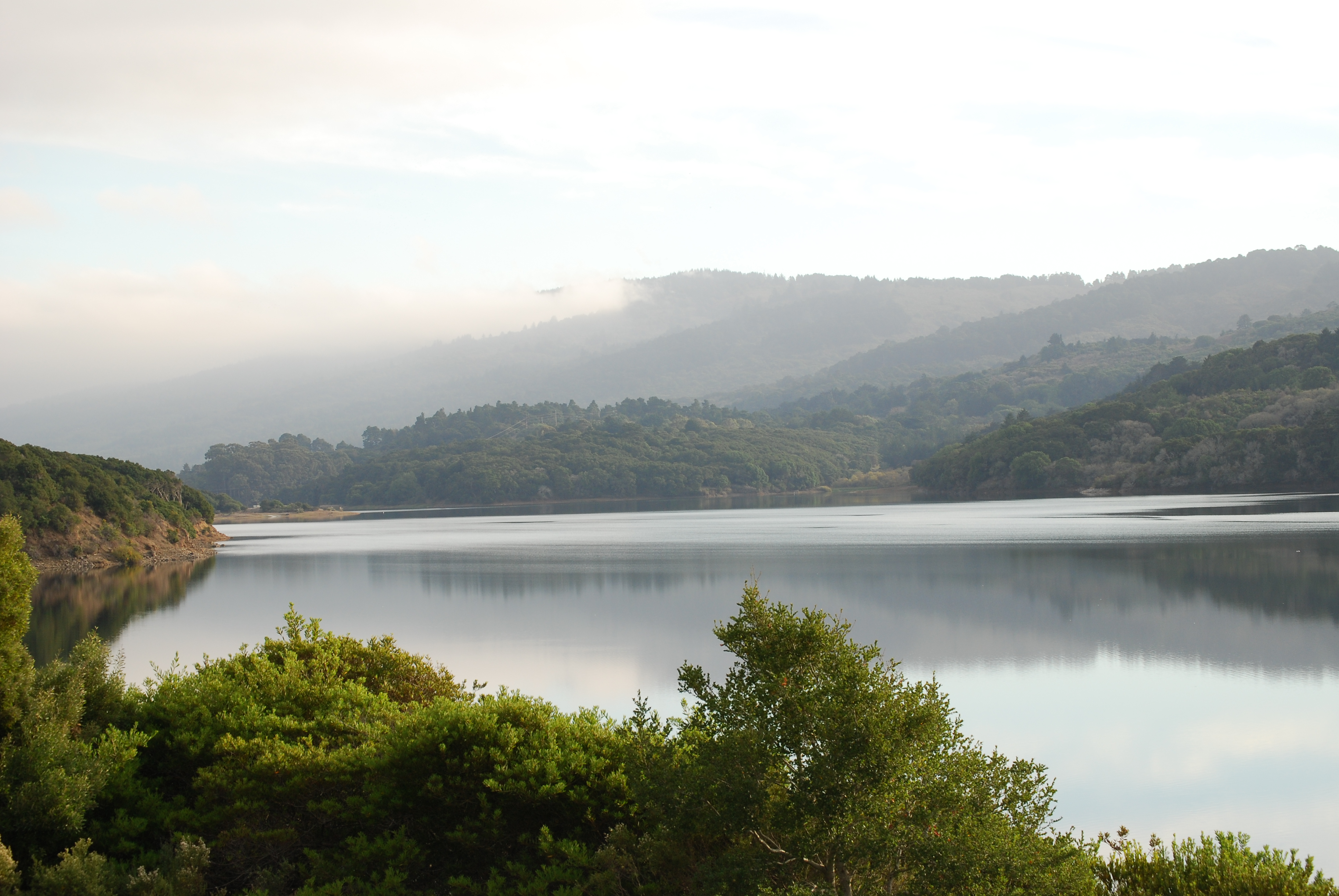
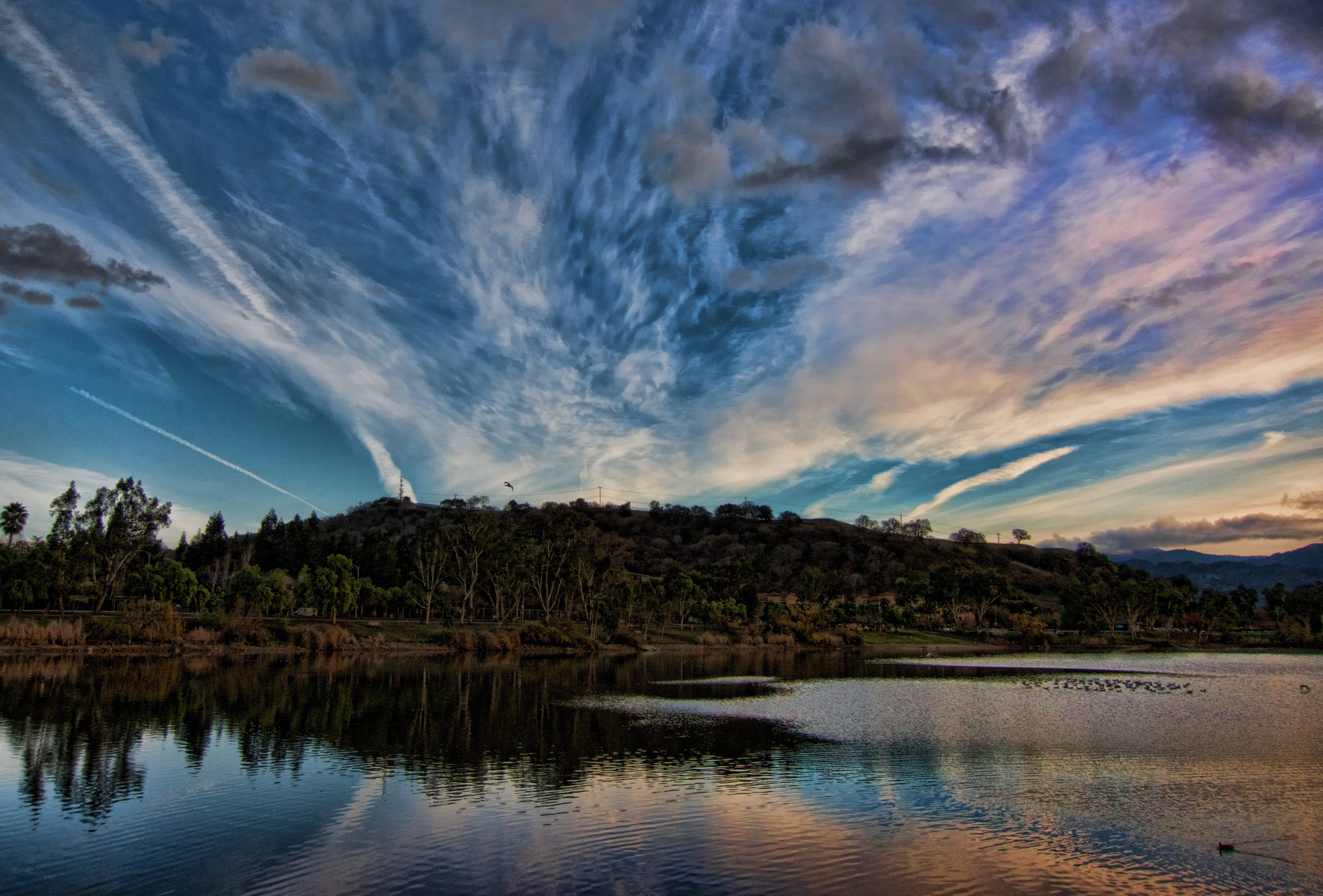
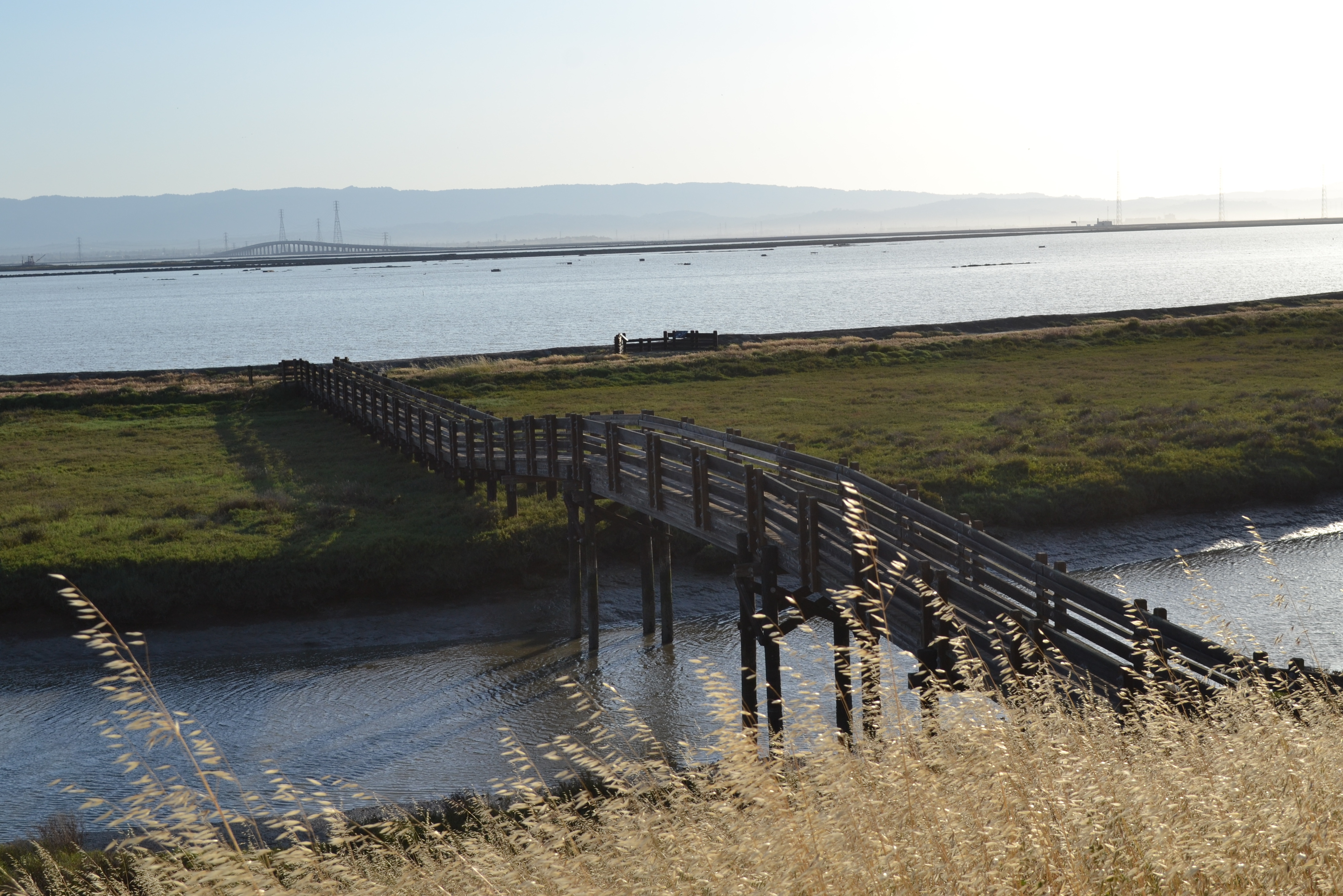
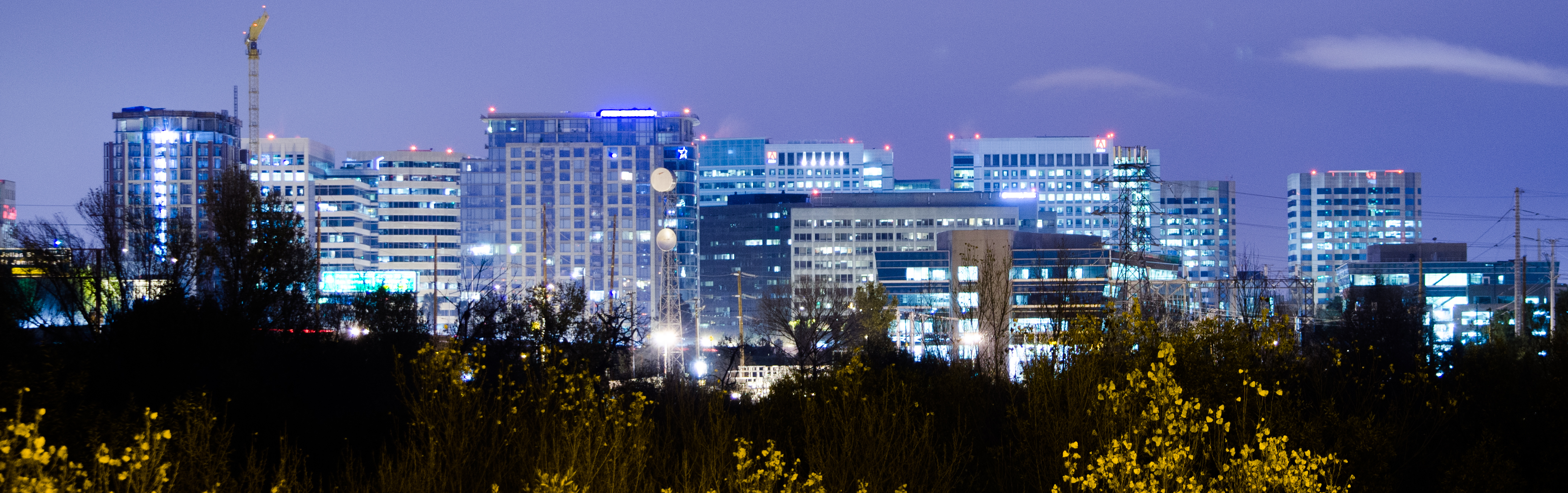
- Santa Clara County as viewed from Alum Rock Park, Crystal Springs Reservoir in San Mateo County, Don Edwards National Widlife Refuge in Alameda County, Downtown San Jose skyline, Almaden Reservoir in South San Jose, and Stanford University

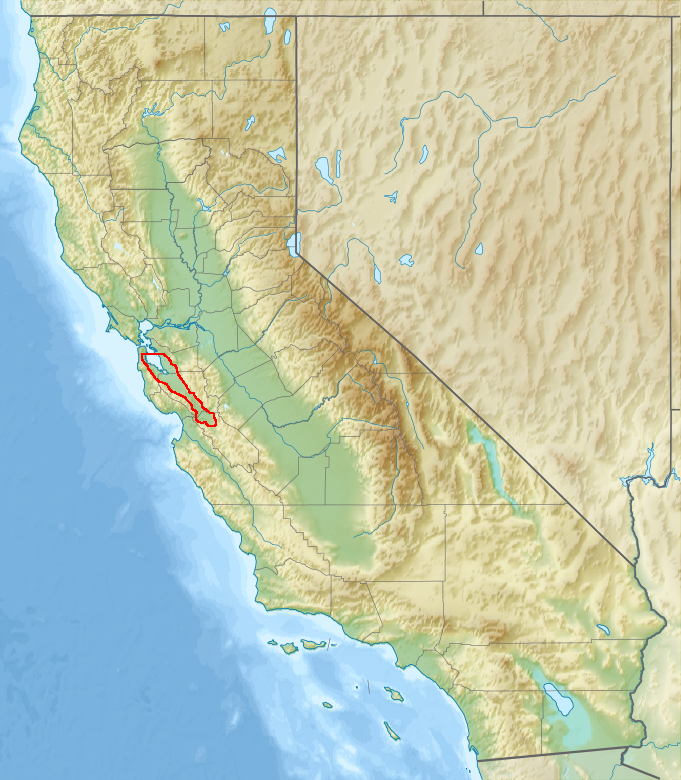
- Location in California
- Length: 90 miles (145 km) northwest–southeast

Geography
- Location: California, United States
- Borders on: San Francisco Bay (north), Santa Cruz Mountains (southwest), Diablo Range (east)
- Coordinates: 37°22′01″N 121°59′02″W

The Santa Clara Valley (Spanish: Valle de Santa Clara) is a geologic trough in Northern California that extends 90 miles (140 km) south–southeast from San Francisco to Hollister. The longitudinal valley is bordered on the west by the Santa Cruz Mountains and on the east by the Diablo Range; the two coastal ranges meet south of Hollister. The San Francisco Bay borders the valley to the north, and fills much of the northern third of the valley. The valley floor is an alluvial plain that formed in the graben (tectonic depression) between the San Andreas Fault to the west and the Hayward and Calaveras faults to the east. Within the valley and surrounding the bay on three sides are the urban communities of San Mateo County, Santa Clara County, and Alameda County, while the narrow southern reaches of the valley extend into rural San Benito County to Hollister. In practical terms, the central portion of the Santa Clara Valley is often considered by itself, contained entirely within Santa Clara County.

The valley, named after the Spanish Mission Santa Clara, was for a time known as the Valley of Heart's Delight for its high concentration of orchards, flowering trees, and plants. Until the 1960s it was the largest fruit-producing and packing region in the world, with 39 canneries. The growing high-tech industry in the 1960s transformed the area from farmland to densely populated cities, and it became referred to as Silicon Valley.

== Overview ==
Once primarily agricultural because of its highly fertile soil, Santa Clara Valley is now largely urbanized, although its far southern reaches south of Gilroy remain agrarian. Few traces of its agricultural past can still be found, but the Santa Clara Valley American Viticultural Area remains a large wine-making region. It was one of the first commercial wine-producing regions in California (and possibly the United States), utilizing high-quality French varietal vines imported from France.

The northern end of the Santa Clara Valley is at San Francisco, and the southern end is south of Hollister. The valley is bounded by the Santa Cruz Mountains on the southwest, which separate the valley from the Pacific Ocean, and by the Diablo Range on the northeast. The valley is approximately 93 miles (150 km) long by 15 miles (20 km) wide. Its largest city is San Jose. Santa Clara Valley has a Mediterranean semi-arid climate.

Joseph S. Diller, a geologist, observed in 1915 that a "notable peculiarity" of the Santa Clara Valley is that "it is divided transversely by a scarcely noticeable soil-covered divide." The northern portion is drained northward by various rivers and creeks into San Francisco Bay. The southern portion of the valley is drained southward by Llagas Creek into the Pajaro River, which in turn flows westward to Monterey Bay. As one travels across the valley floor, "the alluvial plain is continuous across the divide." The summit of the transverse divide is about two miles from the former town of Madrone at an elevation of 345 feet (105 meters), but the alluvial plain is so continuous that most travelers are unaware they are crossing between two drainage basins.

== History ==
The earliest known inhabitants on the Santa Clara Valley are the Ohlone people, who had eight distinct languages and tribes in the coastal region. Mission Santa Clara de Asís, which had control over a vast tract of land stretching from Palo Alto to Gilroy, was founded by Franciscans in 1777. San Jose was California's first town and was also founded in 1777 by Spain as an agricultural pueblo. There were 66 original settlers. In Spanish and Mexican times the land was devoted to cattle, as was most of California. Following the Mexican–American War San Jose was briefly the capital of California. The influx of Americans resulted in relocation of many of the native Mexican and Indian people of San Jose to the mission at Santa Clara, which had been under control of Jesuits from 1850; they founded Santa Clara University there in 1851. In 1860, as an American town, the population of San Jose was 4,579, with cattle ranching still the main agricultural activity. For a time wheat became the main crop, but in the 1870s fruit gradually became the main crop and processing of fruit by drying or canning the predominant industry. The railroad reached San Jose in 1860.

=== The Valley of Heart's Delight ===
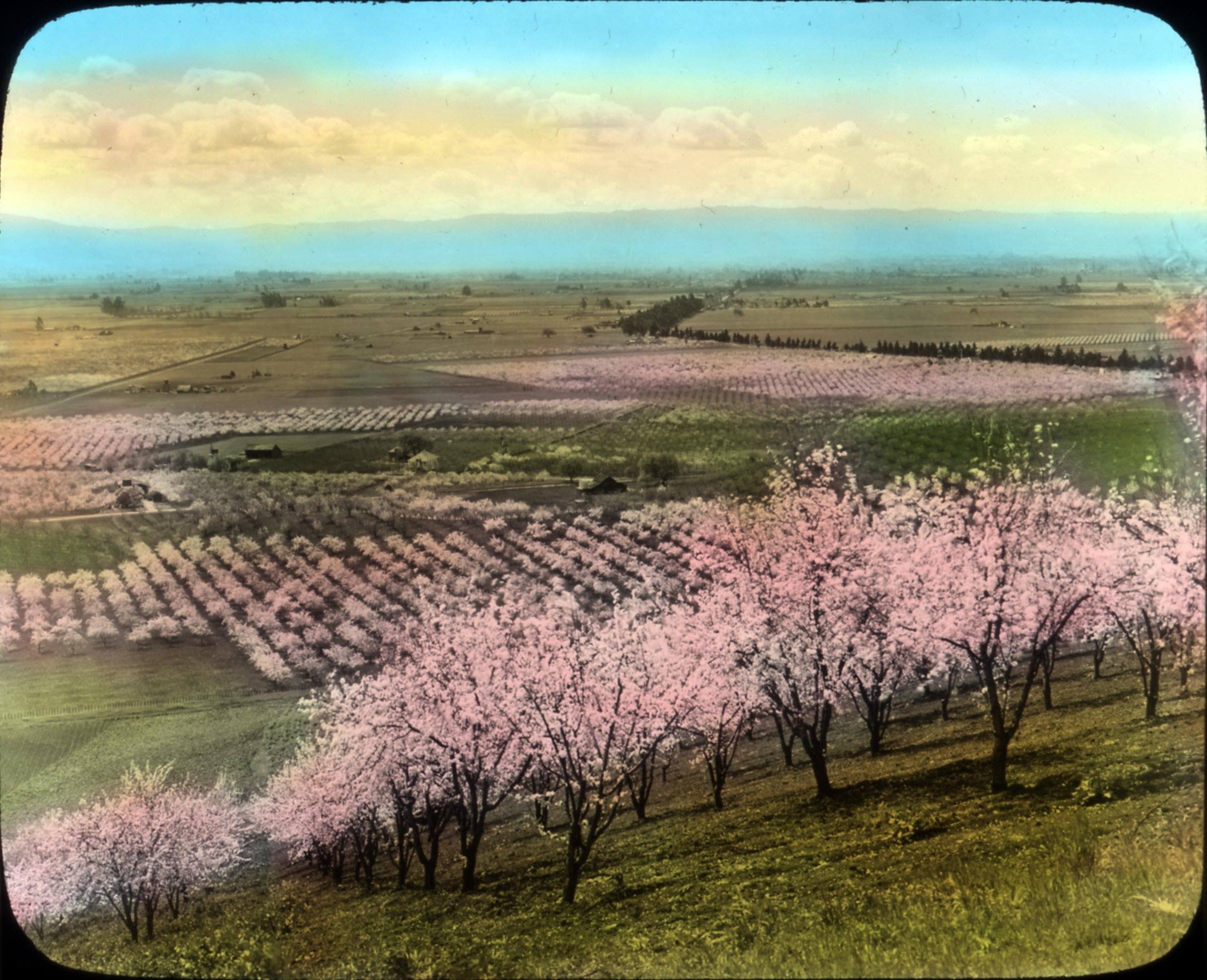
"Valley of the Heart's Delight", mid 20th century

The valley with its scenic beauty, mild climate, and thousands of acres of blooming fruit trees was known as "The Valley of Heart's Delight". Various fruit cooperatives were formed in the area to deal with economic issues, including the California Fruit Union (founded in 1883) and the Santa Clara County Fruit Exchange (founded in 1892). Prunes were a major crop, with the valley was producing the majority of prunes in California by 1900 and shipped internationally. Water was supplied from an artesian aquifer and when the water table dropped, wells were pumped. Many orchards were small with housing and fruit growing in a dispersed pattern. By the 1920s and 1930s, the agricultural and horticultural industries were doing well in the valley and included 18 canneries, 13 dried-fruit packing houses, and 12 fresh-fruit and vegetable shipping firms, and they were shipping internationally.

The need for workers greatly exceeded the local population and in the nineteenth century, Chinese and Japanese immigrants met that need. Toward the end of the nineteenth century many Italians and other immigrants from Southern and Eastern Europe came to the valley and worked in the orchards and canneries. During the 20th century there were Filipino immigrants and increasing numbers of immigrants from Mexico who during World War II became the dominant agricultural workforce. The town of San Jose was dominated by its business community, which was in part composed of Irish Catholics, who had a self-contained social life which did not include immigrant labor. There was marked prejudice against Asians, particularly Chinese, who gradually left the valley.

=== The Great Depression ===
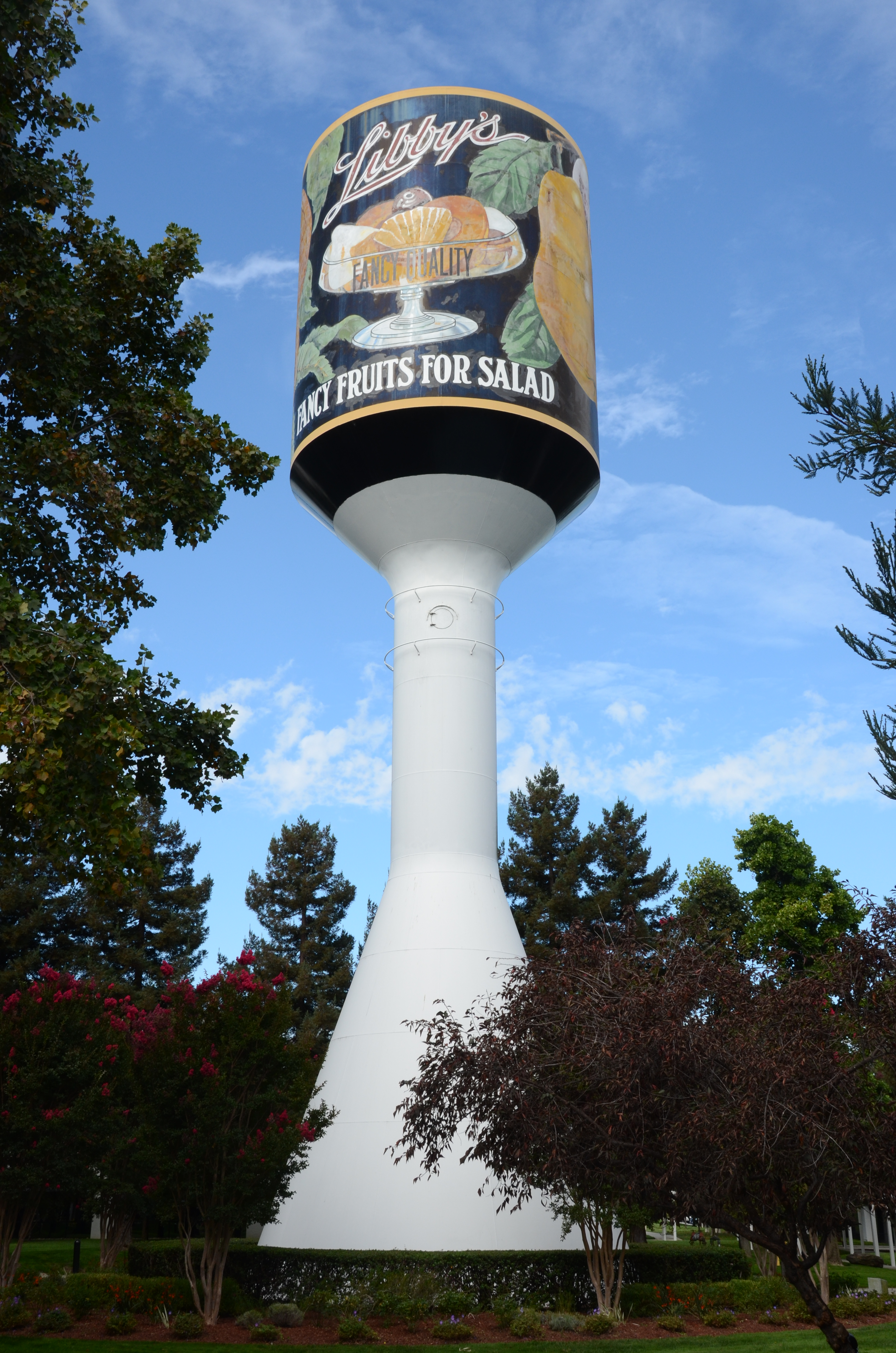
Libby Water Tower, a heritage landmark in Sunnyvale

Deflation and overproduction severely hurt the orchards and packers of the Santa Clara Valley during the Great Depression. Bankrupt farmers from the Dust Bowl, the Okies, made the trek to California. Desperate to feed their families, they joined a workforce that was itself impacted by unemployment. The growers, with record low prices and surplus supply, could pay little. Labor organizers and goon squads battled in the labor camps. Woody Guthrie's songs were on the radio and he wrote a regular column in the San Francisco-based The Daily People's World for the workers. San Francisco had a strong labor union tradition which thrived in Santa Clara County. During the "March Inland" organizing drive the International Longshore and Warehouse Union (ILWU) backed the Cannery and Agricultural Workers' Industrial Union (CAWIU), a Communist-controlled union headquartered in San Jose, which had considerable success organizing farm and cannery workers in the Santa Clara Valley and elsewhere in California until it was suppressed and its leaders jailed in 1934 by the State of California following sustained attacks by business and political forces which, in San Jose, resulted in an atmosphere of terror (the low point of which was a public lynching tacitly supported by James Rolph, the Governor of California). The canneries, with a segregated seasonal work force of white women, were eventually organized, at first by an AFL-affiliated company union, but one which gradually evolved, thanks to rank and file efforts, into a union which genuinely represented cannery workers.

=== War and industry ===
Wartime production associated with World War II brought industry to the valley, such as the building of marine engines for Liberty ships by the Joshua Hendy Iron Works in Sunnyvale. IBM opened its first West Coast manufacturing facility, a card plant in San Jose, in 1943.

During World War II, Santa Clara Valley's Japanese and Japanese American population experienced forced removal, incarceration, and loss of property under Executive Order 9066. Wartime production opened industrial and cannery jobs to women and other workers. Mexican women and bracero workers filled many cannery jobs during the war. In East San Jose, the Mayfair Packing Company gave its name to the Mayfair district, where many Mexican workers settled during and after the war.

The Polaris submarine-launched ballistic missile was built during the Cold War by Lockheed Missiles & Space Division in Sunnyvale for the United States Navy. For the most part, the defense industry and traditional electronics manufacturers, with the exception of IBM, in the Santa Clara Valley were unionized, mainly by the International Association of Machinists and Aerospace Workers, International Brotherhood of Electrical Workers, and Teamsters. The United Electrical, Radio and Machine Workers of America, a communist dominated union, but friendly to minority and women workers, gradually lost its place during the McCarthy era.

=== Silicon Valley ===
In the 1950s, the first transistor industries were established in the area. Led by Stanford University, the lower San Francisco Peninsula became a global tech hub, known as Silicon Valley. The name refers to silicon, the most common semiconductor used to produce microchips and other electronic devices.

The borders of Silicon Valley have been variously defined. Most observers include the entirety of Santa Clara County and the southern portions of San Mateo and Alameda counties, while others extend the region northwest to San Francisco or northeast to San Ramon.

=== San Jose ===
In 1950, Dutch Hamann was appointed city manager of San Jose. Hamann's boosterism was supported by Joe Ridder, publisher of the San Jose Mercury. In power until 1969, Hamann created a master plan for San Jose and embarked on a program of annexation. The population of San Jose increased from 95 thousand in 1950 to 446 thousand in 1970. There were critics: Santa Clara County Planning Director Karl Belser, who opposed urban sprawl, commented, "Perhaps the only use we will ever find for the hydrogen bomb will be to erase this great mistake from the face of the earth." Housing for each additional 1000 people took 257 acres of land. In more recent years, San Jose and the Santa Clara Valley have suffered from extensive droughts in California to the extent that some residents may run out of household water by the summer of 2022.

== Geology ==
Santa Clara Valley was created by the sudden growth of the Santa Cruz Mountains and the Diablo Range during the later Cenozoic era. This was a period of intense mountain building in California when the folding and thrusting of the Earth's crust, combined with active volcanism, gave shape to the present state of California. Hence, Santa Clara Valley is a structural valley, created by mountain building, as opposed to an erosional valley, which is a valley that has undergone the wearing away of the Earth's surface by natural agents. The underlying geology of the Santa Cruz Mountains was also formed by the sediment of the ancient seas, where marine shale points to Miocene origin. Today, evidence of this is still found in the Santa Cruz Mountains, where shark's teeth and the remains of maritime life are still found as high as Scotts Valley, a city nestled in the mountains. The highest peak on the Santa Cruz Mountain Range side of the valley is Loma Prieta at 3,790 feet. The highest peak in the Diablo Range side of the valley is Mount Hamilton, specifically Copernicus Peak at 4,370 feet elevation. It is the highest peak in Santa Clara County.

The valley is a graben between the San Andreas and Hayward faults.

=== Quicksilver mine ===
During the 19th century, 37,388 metric tons of mercury were extracted from the New Almaden mine south of San Jose and northeast of Santa Cruz. The area, closed for many years, resulted in pollution of the Guadalupe River and South San Francisco Bay. After intermittent mining operations finally ceased in the 20th century, the area was purchased by Santa Clara County to be used as a park and was designated a National Historic Landmark.

== See also ==
- Santa Clara Valley Habitat Conservation Plan
- Santa Clara Valley AVA
