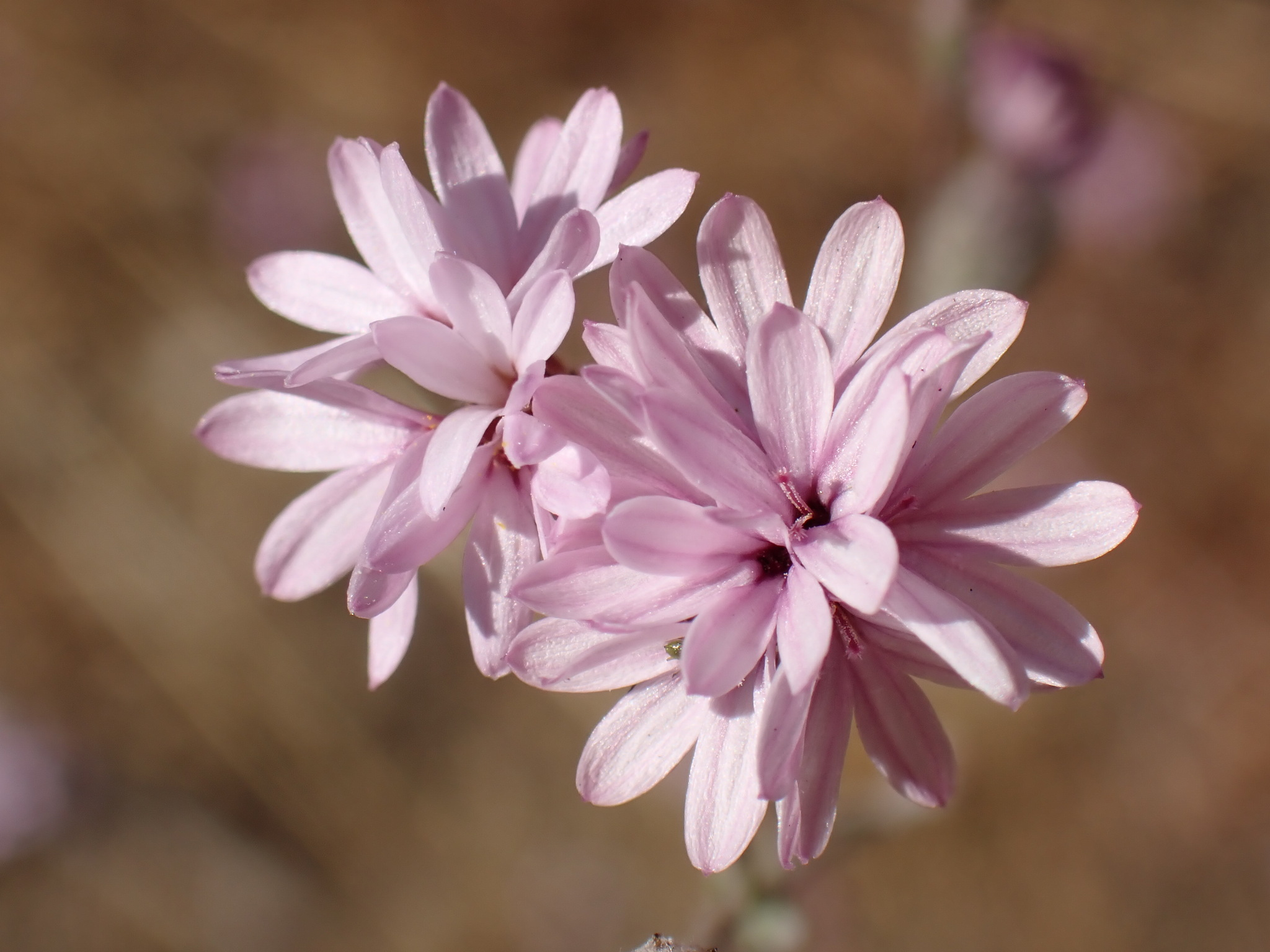

Conservation status
- Imperiled (NatureServe)

Scientific classification
- Kingdom: Plantae
- Clade: Tracheophytes
- Clade: Angiosperms
- Clade: Eudicots
- Clade: Asterids
- Order: Asterales
- Family: Asteraceae
- Genus: Lessingia
- Species: L. arachnoidea

Binomial name
- Lessingia arachnoidea Greene

= Lessingia arachnoidea =

Species of flowering plant

Lessingia arachnoidea is a rare species of flowering plant in the family Asteraceae known by the common name Crystal Springs lessingia. It is endemic to the U.S. state of California, where it is known from a few occurrences in the vicinity of Crystal Springs Reservoir on the San Francisco Peninsula and southward to serpentine soil in Woodside. It may also exist in Sonoma County to the north. The plant grows in chaparral, scrub, grasslands and other local plant communities, on serpentine soils.

This is an annual herb producing a slender, erect stem up to 80 centimeters in maximum height. It is woolly toward the ends of the stems, less so toward the base of the plant. The leaves are narrow and sometimes toothed, the lowest approaching 11 centimeters long and the uppermost reduced in size. The inflorescence is made up of a single flower head at the tip of the slender stem. The flower head is lined with tiny lance-shaped phyllaries with purplish pointed tips and sometimes a coat of woolly fibers. The head is discoid, lacking ray florets but bearing several funnel-shaped lavender disc florets with raylike lobes. The fruit is an achene with a very hairy hard body 2 or 3 millimeters long and a small, bristly pappus on top.

Plants need bare soil or soil without any exotic weed competition to thrive, and can even grow in the bare soil of well worn trails. Late-flowering from August to October, and one of the last of the summer California wildflowers to bloom. Plants are able to grow without any rainfall or any moisture in the ground around their roots, surviving by absorbing dewfall at night through their leaves. Ripe seeds germinate readily, 40% in three days and 80% within 15 days. When managing or restoring this species, the estimated longevity of seeds in the soil is between 100 and 250 years.

Even though these plants live in serpentine soil which is known to be low in nutrients, however, these plants still require a minimum threshold of nitrogen, phosphorus, potassium, calcium, magnesium, copper, zinc, manganese, iron and boron and a narrow range of pH for their seedling's survival and to grow to adults and reproduce. The pH is 7.1 and the PPM thresholds for nutrients are: N = 18, P = 5, K = 31, Ca = 391, Mg = 256, Cu = 1, Zn = 1, Fe = 26, and B = 0.02 PPM.
