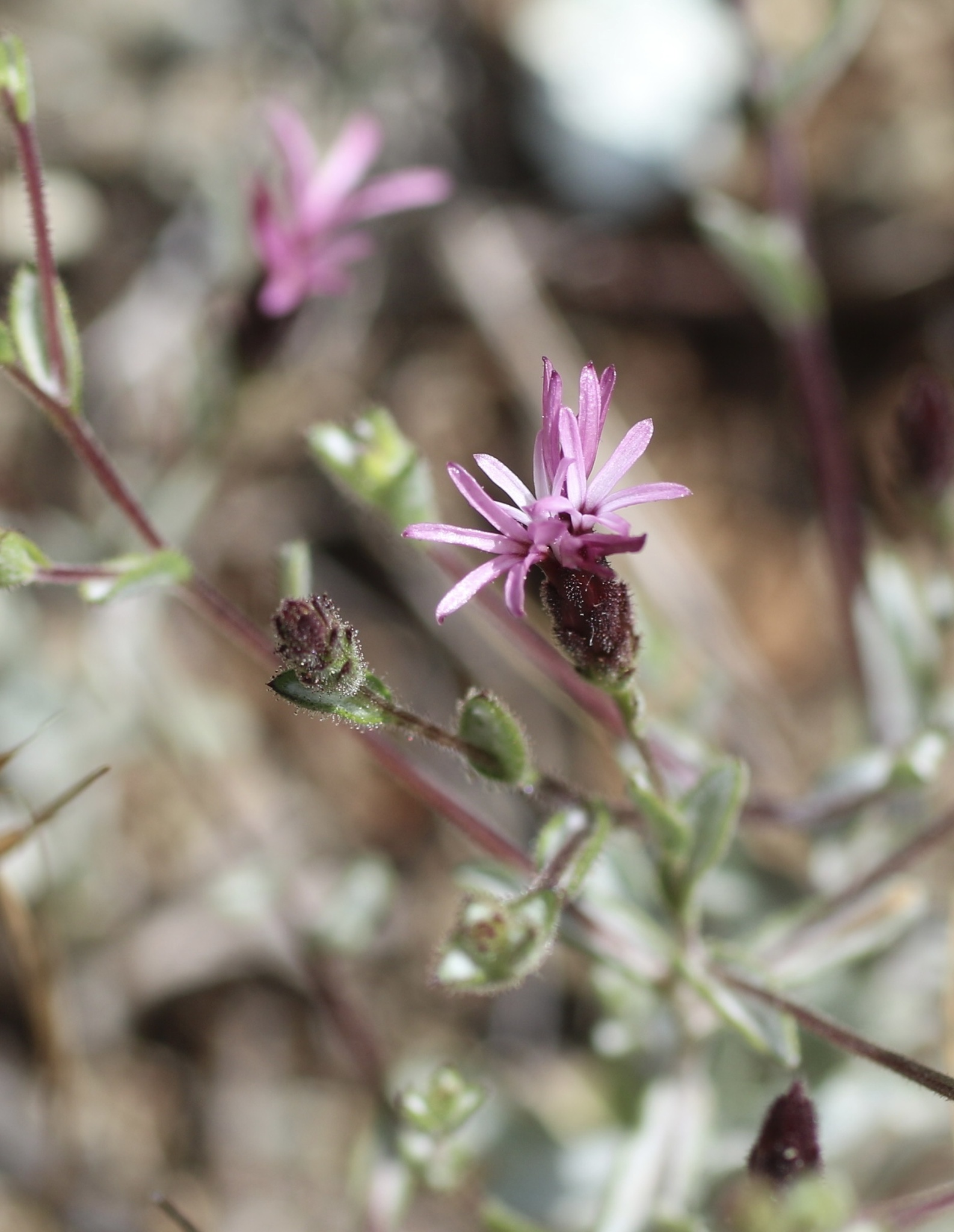

Scientific classification
- Kingdom: Plantae
- Clade: Tracheophytes
- Clade: Angiosperms
- Clade: Eudicots
- Clade: Asterids
- Order: Asterales
- Family: Asteraceae
- Genus: Lessingia
- Species: L. ramulosa

Binomial name
- Lessingia ramulosa A.Gray

Synonyms
- Lessingia ramulosa var. adenophora (Greene) A.Gray

= Lessingia ramulosa =

Species of flowering plant

Lessingia ramulosa, the Sonoma lessingia, is a plant species endemic to California.

Lessingia ramulosa is an herb up to 50 cm tall. It has persistent basal leaves plus leaves on the stems. Flower heads are borne singly at the ends of branches, with lavender flowers.
