= Benitoa =

Conservation status
- Vulnerable (NatureServe)

Scientific classification
- Kingdom: Plantae
- Clade: Tracheophytes
- Clade: Angiosperms
- Clade: Eudicots
- Clade: Asterids
- Order: Asterales
- Family: Asteraceae
- Subfamily: Asteroideae
- Tribe: Astereae
- Subtribe: Machaerantherinae
- Genus: Benitoa; D.D.Keck
- Species: B. occidentalis

Binomial name
- Benitoa occidentalis (H.M.Hall) D.D.Keck

Synonyms
- Haplopappus occidentalis H.M.Hall; Lessingia occidentalis (H.M.Hall) M.A.Lane

Genus of flowering plants

Benitoa is a genus of flowering plants in the family Asteraceae.

Benitoa is monotypic, containing the single species Benitoa occidentalis. It is sometimes included in genus Lessingia as the synonym Lessingia occidentalis.

Benitoa is endemic to California, where it is known mostly from San Benito County, the region for which it is named. Additional populations have been found in nearby parts of Fresno and Monterey Counties.
