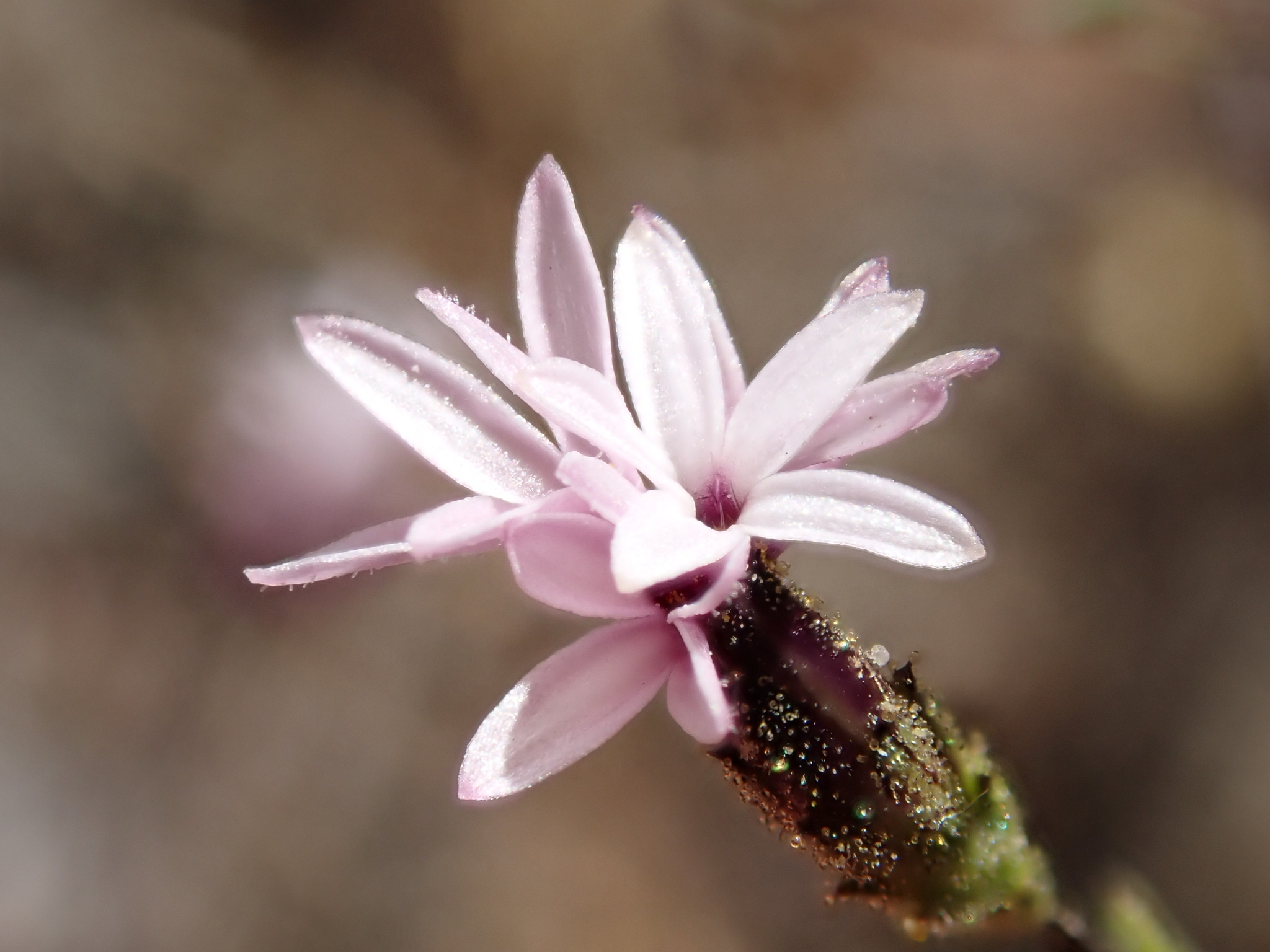

Conservation status
- Imperiled (NatureServe)

Scientific classification
- Kingdom: Plantae
- Clade: Tracheophytes
- Clade: Angiosperms
- Clade: Eudicots
- Clade: Asterids
- Order: Asterales
- Family: Asteraceae
- Genus: Lessingia
- Species: L. micradenia

Binomial name
- Lessingia micradenia A.Gray

= Lessingia micradenia =

Species of flowering plant

Lessingia micradenia is a rare species of flowering plant in the family Asteraceae known by the common name Mt. Tamalpais lessingia. It is endemic to the San Francisco Bay Area of California, where it occurs in areas with serpentine soils. The species is divided into two rare varieties, each with a limited occurrence on opposite sides of the Bay Area. Lessingia micradenia var. glabrata is found in several locations across Santa Clara County south of San Jose, while var. micradenia is known only from a few spots around Mount Tamalpais in Marin County.

This is a slender annual herb growing erect and varying in size from just a few centimeters to over half a meter tall, with spreading branches. It is often hairy or woolly in texture. The upper leaves are small and pointed, no more than 2 centimeters long, and the lower leaves are longer and wither early. The petite flower heads appear singly or in clusters. Each head is lined with purple-tipped, glandular phyllaries. The head is discoid, containing no ray florets but a few funnel-shaped, lobed disc florets in shades of light purple to nearly white. The fruit is an achene with pappus of five distinct whitish points.
