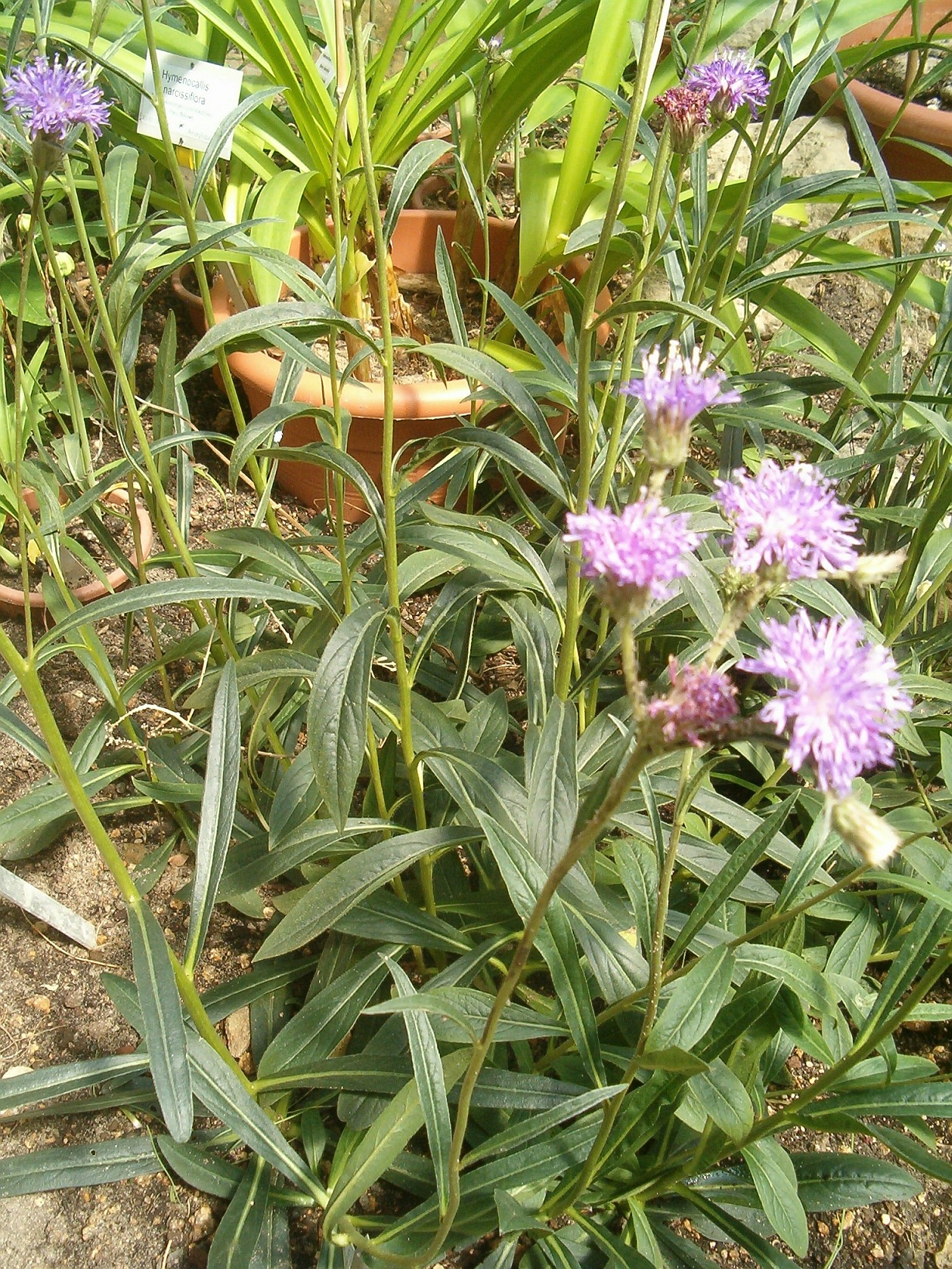
- Chrysolaena flexuosa at Berlin Botanical Garden

Scientific classification
- Kingdom: Plantae
- Clade: Tracheophytes
- Clade: Angiosperms
- Clade: Eudicots
- Clade: Asterids
- Order: Asterales
- Family: Asteraceae
- Genus: Chrysolaena; H.Rob.

= Chrysolaena =

Genus of flowering plants

Chrysolaena is a genus of flowering plants belonging to the family Asteraceae.

Its native range is Peru to Brazil and Northern Argentina.

Species:

- Chrysolaena campestris (DC.) Dematt.
- Chrysolaena candelabrum (Chodat) Dematt.
- Chrysolaena cognata (Less.) Dematt.
- Chrysolaena cordifolia Dematt.
- Chrysolaena cristobaliana Dematt.
- Chrysolaena desertorum (Mart. ex DC.) Dematt.
- Chrysolaena dusenii (Malme) Dematt.
- Chrysolaena flexuosa (Sims) H.Rob.
- Chrysolaena guaranitica Dematt.
- Chrysolaena lithospermifolia (Hieron.) H.Rob.
- Chrysolaena nicolackii H.Rob.
- Chrysolaena obovata (Less.) Dematt.
- Chrysolaena oligophylla (Vell.) H.Rob.
- Chrysolaena platensis (Spreng.) H.Rob.
- Chrysolaena propinqua (Hieron.) H.Rob.
- Chrysolaena sceptrum (Chodat) Dematt.
- Chrysolaena simplex (Less.) Dematt.
- Chrysolaena verbascifolia (Less.) H.Rob.
