= Saint Leo the Great School =

Saint Leo the Great School can refer to:

- Saint Leo the Great School (Pennsylvania), Lancaster, Pennsylvania, United States
- St. Leo the Great School (San Jose), San Jose, California, United States

== See also ==
- Pope Leo I (400–461), also known as Saint Leo the Great
