= St. Leon =

St. Leon or Saint Leon is the anglicization of Saint Léon, the French form of the name of Saint Leo. It may refer to:

== Places ==
=== Canada ===
- St. Leon, British Columbia, also known as St. Leon Hot Springs, an unincorporated settlement in the Kootenay region of British Columbia, Canada
- St. Leon, Manitoba, an unincorporated community in Manitoba, United States

=== United States ===
St. Leon, Indiana

== Books ==
- St. Leon (novel) (1799), eighteenth-century British philosopher William Godwin's second novel
- St. Leon: A Drama. In Three Acts (1835), a play by John Hobart Caunter inspired by Godwin's novel

== See also ==
- Saint Leonard (disambiguation)
- Saint Leo (disambiguation)
- San Leon (disambiguation) (in Spanish)
- San Leone (disambiguation) (in Italian)
- Saint-Léon (disambiguation) (in French)
