= Coachella Valley Church =

Church in San Jose, California, US

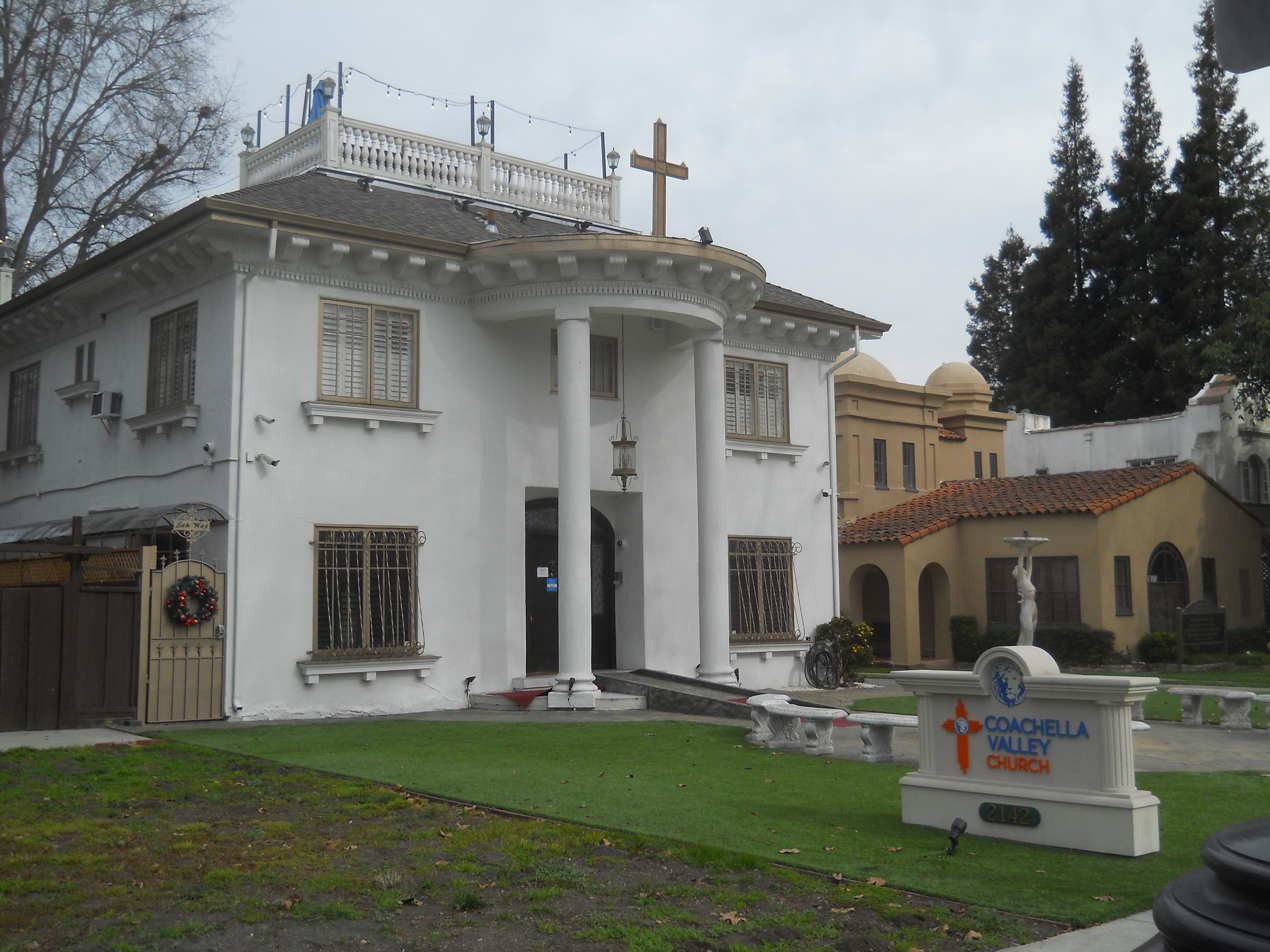
- Coachella Valley Church
- 37.3442°N 121.9296°W
- Location: 2142 The Alameda, San Jose, California 95126
- Country: USA
- Denomination: Rastafarian
- Website: coachellavalley.church

History
- Dedicated: 2016

Coachella Valley Church is a Rastafarian church of the Ethiopian Zion Coptic Church, located on The Alameda in San Jose, California. It was incorporated in 2016 and is at the same location as a previous dispensary, Amsterdam's Garden. The city has a history of litigation against its operators and seeks to end their operations, claiming it is an unpermitted marijuana dispensary.

== Church ==
Coachella Valley Church describes itself as an Ethiopian Zion Coptic Church which is monotheistic, worships a single God referred to as Jah, and uses cannabis as a sacrament. The members, known as Coachellans, believe that the use of cannabis helps elevate people to a higher understanding of self and greater closeness to Jah—who members believe partially resides within each individual. They ritually use cannabis, which they call "God's Holy Healing Sacrament" to deepen love and livity. The church house on The Alameda has an altar, pews and sacred images "like any other Christian house of worship".

== History and legal issues ==
The City of San Jose filed a complaint against the owners and operators of Amsterdam's Garden marijuana dispensary in May 2015 for zoning violations and for not conforming to city regulations on marijuana dispensaries. After the dispensary was shut down, Coachella Church of Cannabis, later renamed Coachella Valley Church, began operations at the same location. Around November 2017, the operators stated that they were not legally a marijuana dispensary under city regulations but rather a church, and should be exempt from taxation, zoning and other regulations as a legitimate religious group under the United States Religious Land Use and Institutionalized Persons Act (RLUIPA) of 2000.

The city attorney of San Jose has said: "Whatever their followers want to smoke, that's not the issue. It's the distribution and sale coming from the dispensary." In 2017 the attorney said he would file an injunction to prevent cannabis sales on the church premises. By late December 2017, the injunction had not been granted; a hearing for a preliminary injunction was set for late January 2018.

== See also ==
- Cannabis and religion
- Entheogen
