= San Leone =

San Leone may refer to various places, jurisdictions and people:

- Saint Leo (disambiguation)
- Saint-Léon (disambiguation)
- San Leone (see), a former bishopric in Calabria (Italy), nominally restored as Catholic titular see
- a suburb of the modern Agrigento on Sicily (Italy)
- San Leone (river), a river in the Province of the river Agrigento, Sicily, Italy
