= Saint-Léon-de-Standon =

- Parish municipality
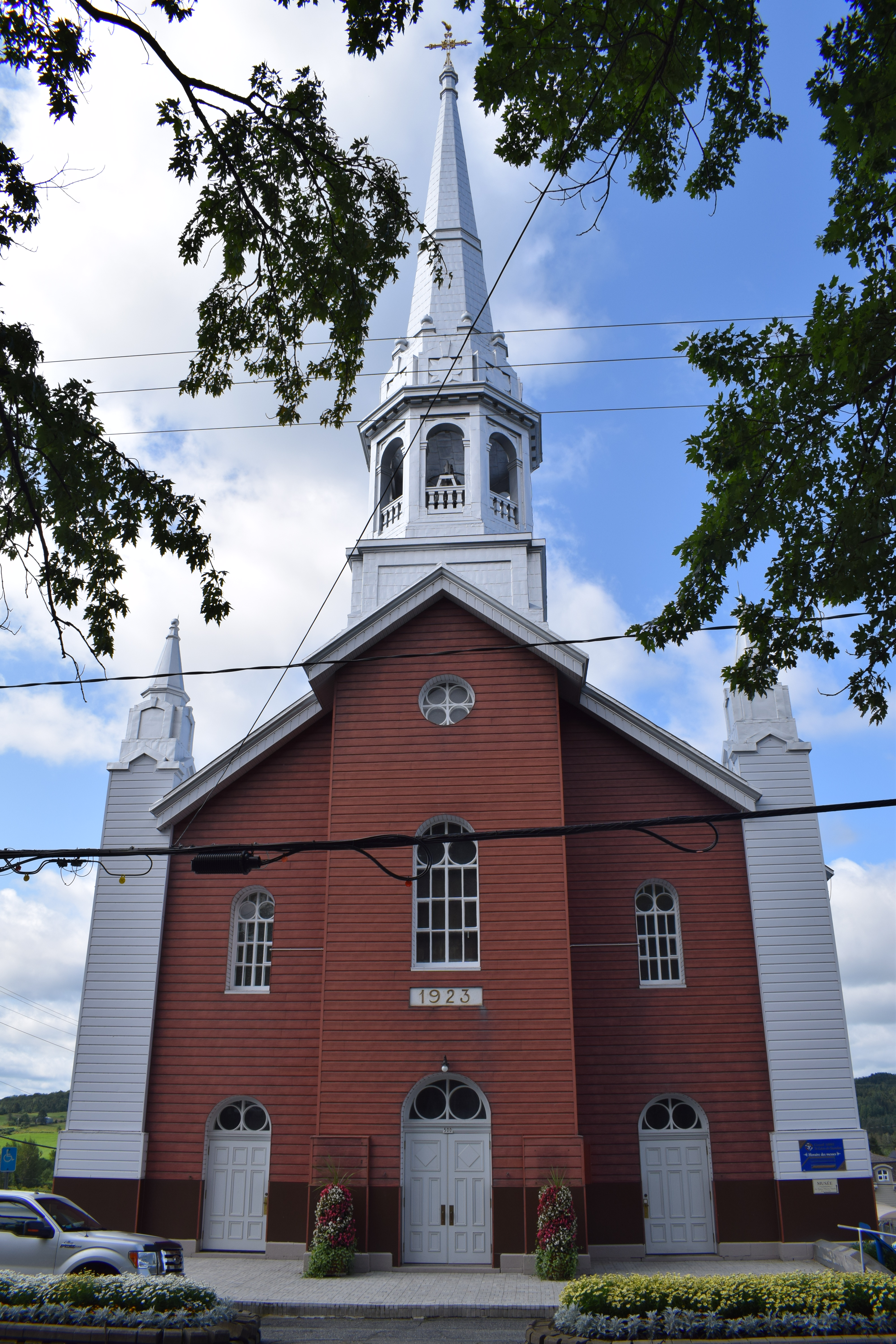

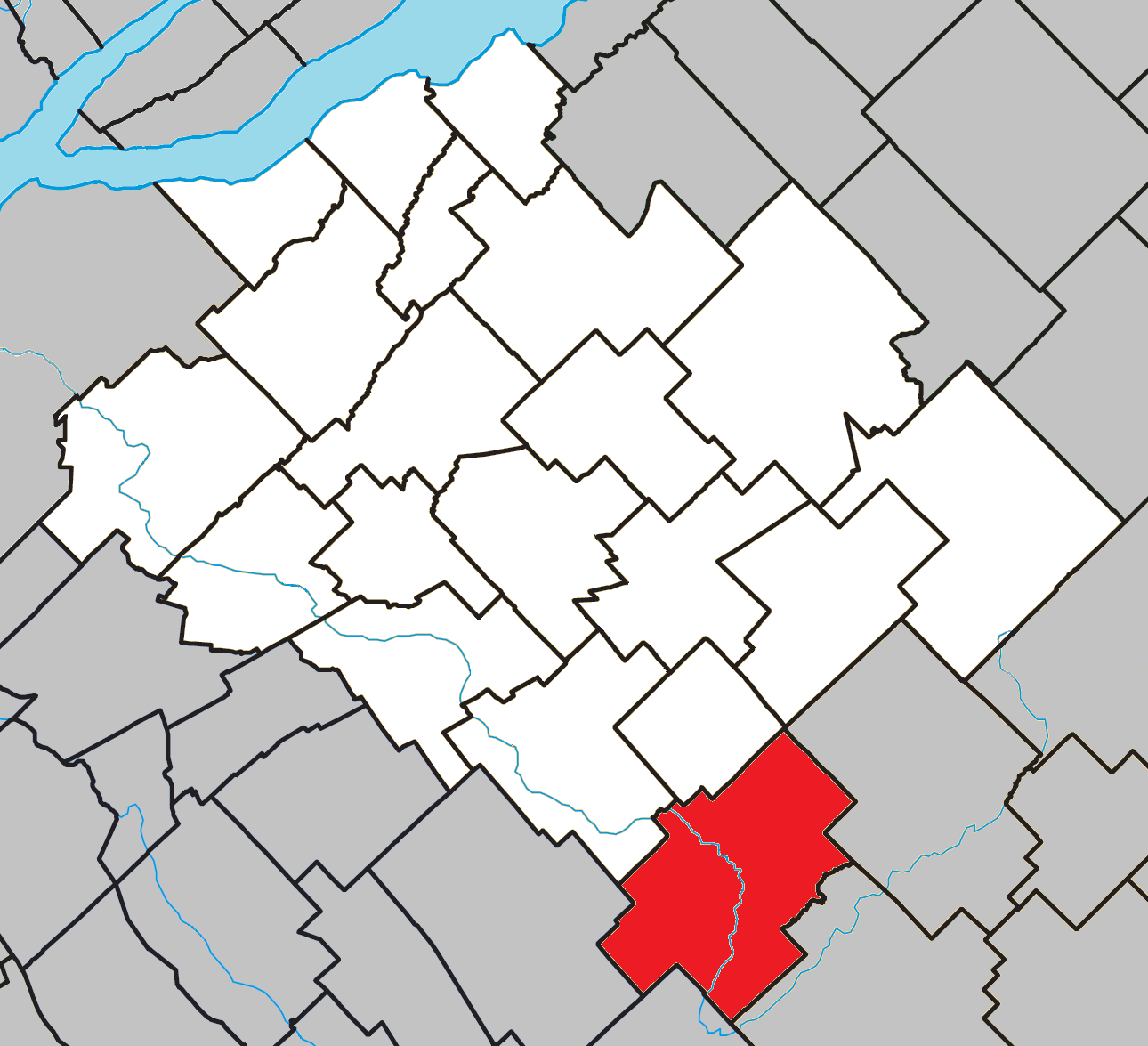
- Location within Bellechasse RCM

- Location in province of Quebec
- Coordinates: 46°29′N 70°37′W
- Country: Canada
- Province: Quebec
- Region: Chaudière-Appalaches
- RCM: Bellechasse
- Constituted: January 1, 1874

Government
  - Mayor: Cynthia Lapointe
  - Fed. riding: Bellechasse—Les Etchemins—Lévis
  - Prov. riding: Bellechasse

Area
  - Total: 136.20 km^{2} (52.59 sq mi)
  - Land: 136.88 km^{2} (52.85 sq mi)
- There is an apparent contradiction between two authoritative sources

Population (2021)
  - Total: 1,042
  - Density: 7.6/km^{2} (20/sq mi)
  - Pop 2016-2021: ▼7.5%
  - Dwellings: 678
- Time zone: UTC−5 (EST)
  - Summer (DST): UTC−4 (EDT)
- Postal code(s): G0R 4L0
- Area codes: 418 and 581
- Highways: R-277
- Website: https://www.st-leon-de-standon.com/

Saint-Léon-de-Standon is a parish municipality of about 1,000 people in the Bellechasse Regional County Municipality in the Chaudière-Appalaches region of Quebec. The Etchemin River goes through the municipality.

== Geography ==
The Rivière des Fleurs, which flows south-west, forms the south-eastern boundary of the municipality and joins the Etchemin River in the south. From its source in the west of the municipality, the Rivière Viveine, a tributary of the Etchemin River, flows south-east.

== Demographics ==
In the 2021 Census of Population conducted by Statistics Canada, Saint-Léon-de-Standon had a population of 1,042 living in 543 of its 678 total private dwellings, a change of −7.5% from its 2016 population of 1,127. With a land area of 136.88 km^{2} (52.85 sq mi), it had a population density of 7.6/km^{2} (19.7/sq mi) in 2021.

== See also ==
- St. Leon (disambiguation)
