= St. Leo =

St. Leo may refer to one of several saints named Leo, or:

== Places ==
=== Australia ===
- St Leo's Catholic College, Sydney
- St Leo's College, University of Queensland, Brisbane

=== Canada ===
- Saint Leo's Elementary School (Brantford), Ontario
- St. Leo's Roman Catholic Church, Mimico

=== Ireland ===
- St Leo's College, Carlow

=== United States ===
- St. Leo, Florida
- Saint Leo Abbey
- St. Leo, Kansas
- St. Leo, Minnesota
- Saint Leo, West Virginia

==== Schools ====
- Saint Leo University, St Leo, Florida
- St. Leo the Great School, Oakland, California
- St. Leo the Great School, San Jose, California
- St.Leo's Parish School, Elmwood Park, New Jersey
- St. Leo Catholic School, Winston-Salem, North Carolina
- St. Leo Primary School, KwaZulu-Natal Province, South Africa

==== Churches named St. Leo ====
- Saint Leo the Great Parish, within the Roman Catholic Diocese of San Jose, California
- St.Leo's Roman Catholic Church, Elmwood Park, New Jersey
- Chapel of St Leo, Żurrieq, Malta

== Other ==
- St. Leo's (soccer team), an early twentieth century American soccer team
