= The Alameda, San Jose =

The Alameda
- Neighborhood of San Jose
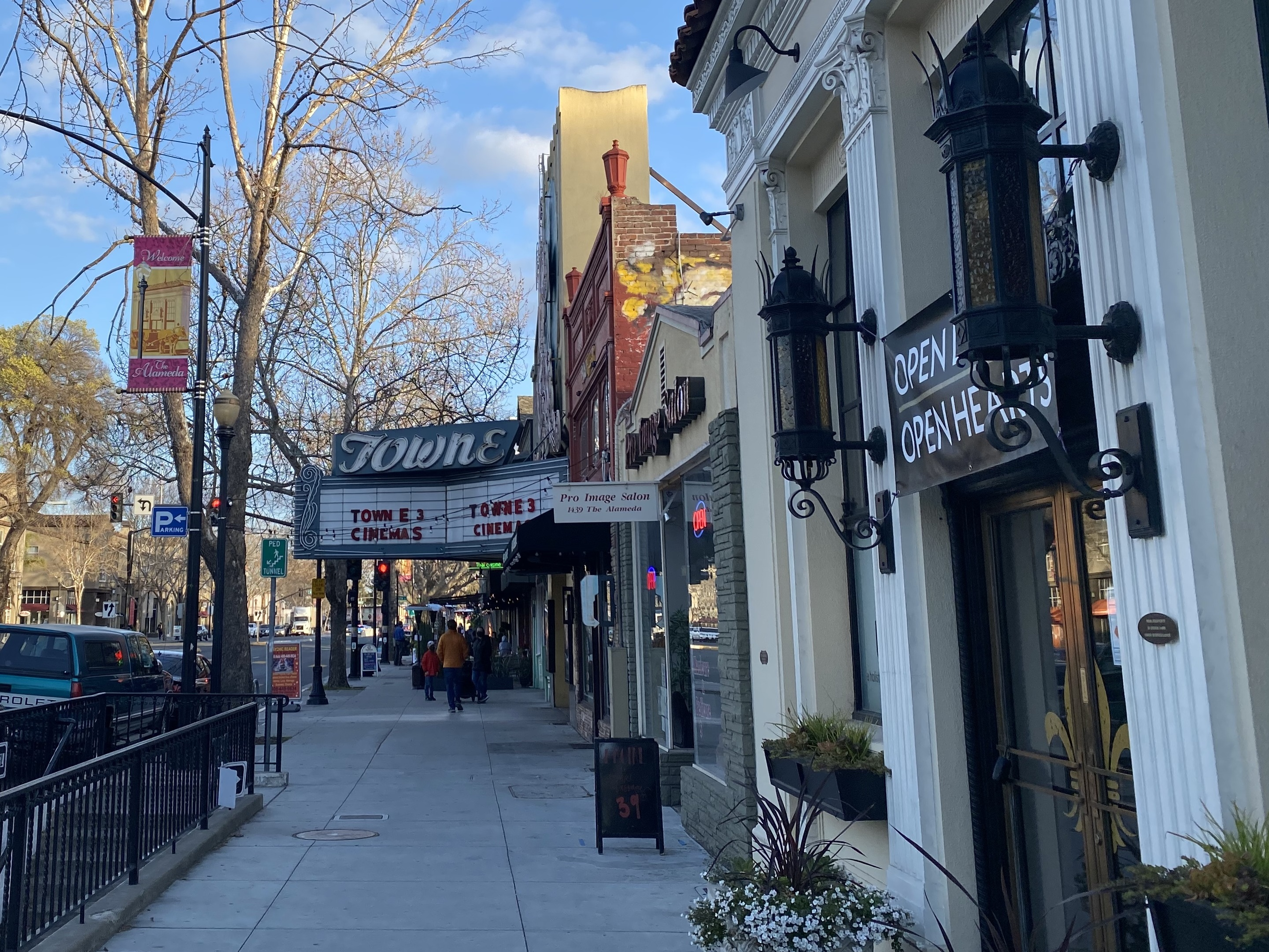
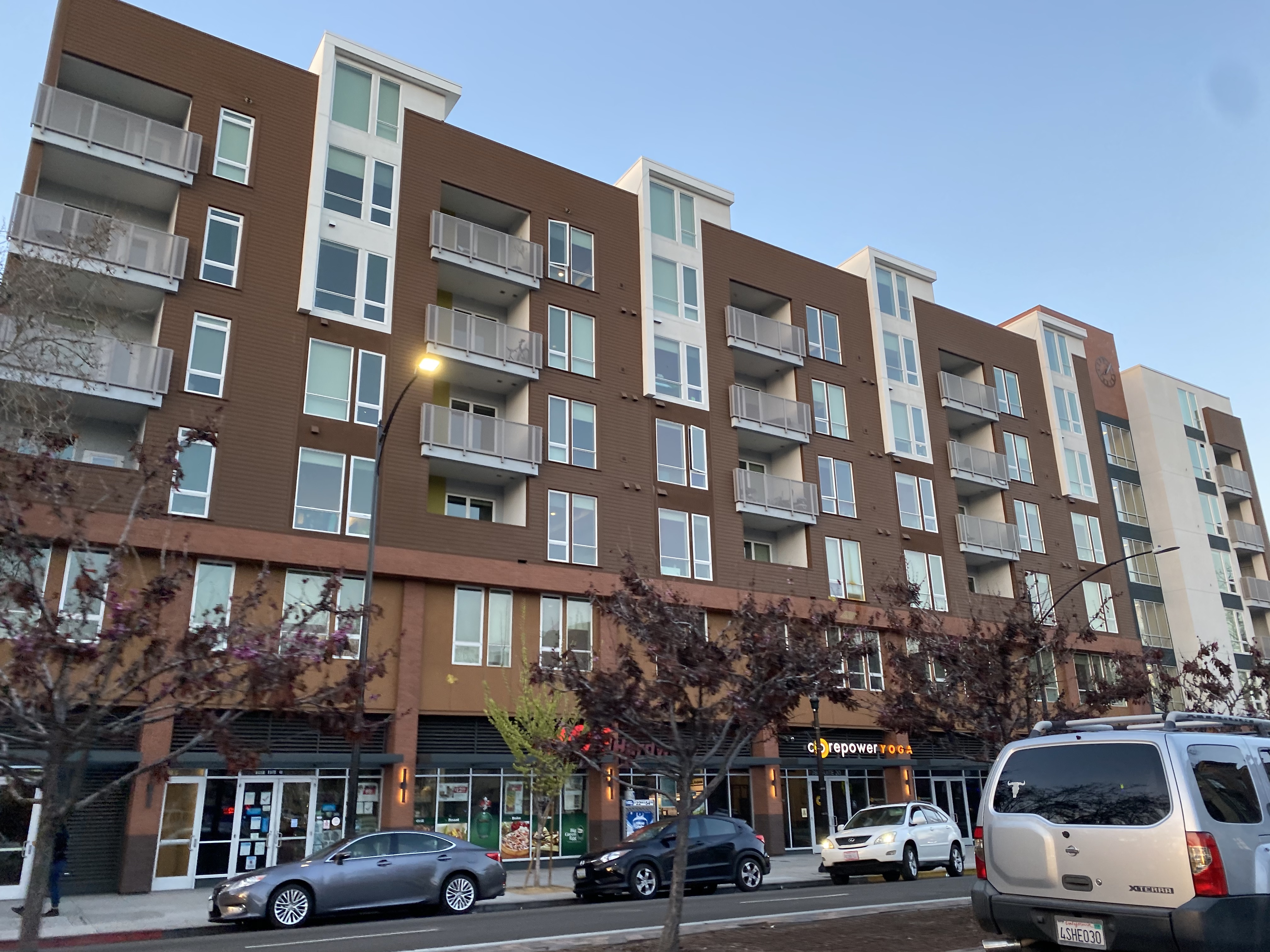
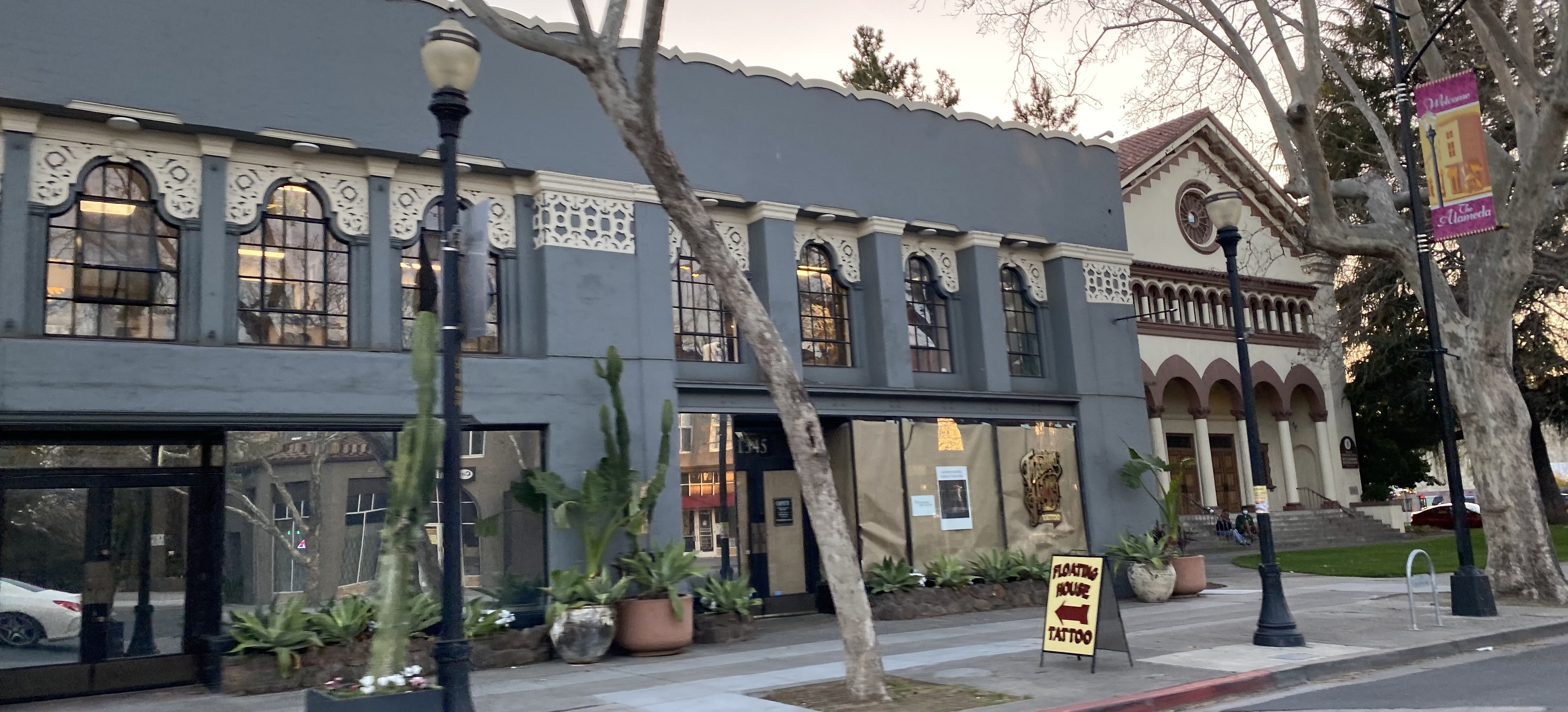
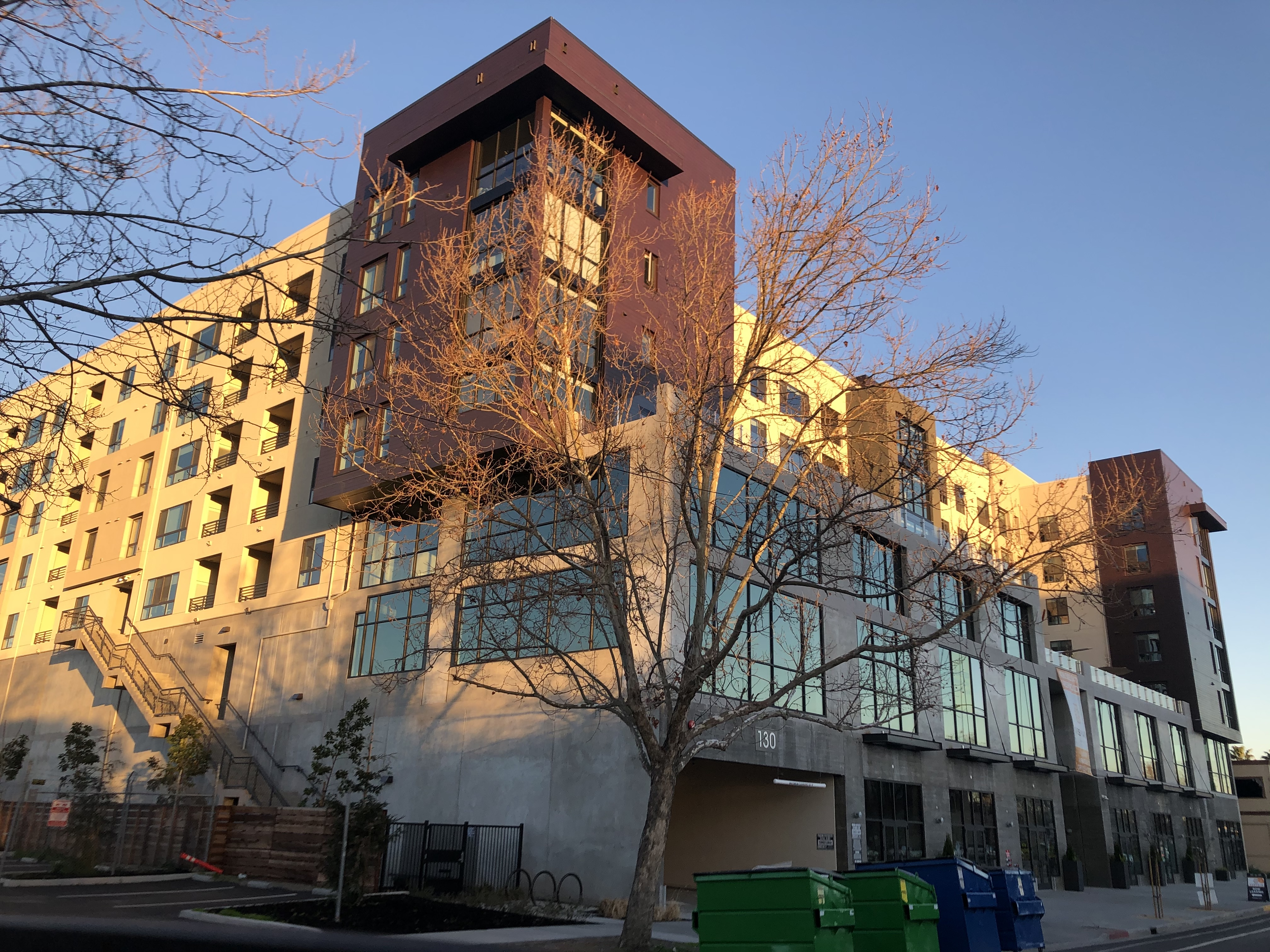
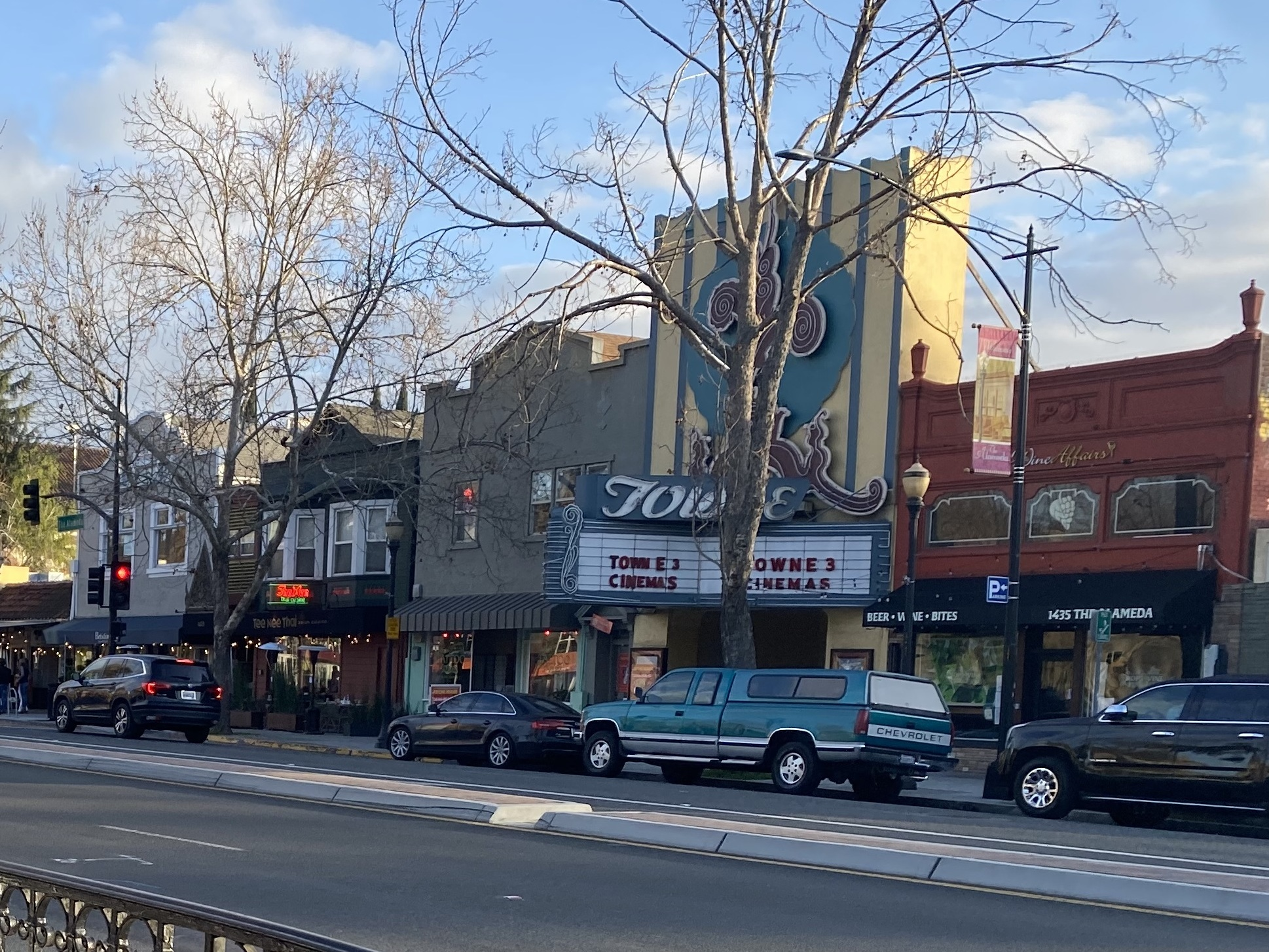

- Location within San Jose
- Coordinates: 37.332230100°N 121.906287000°W
- Country: United States
- State: California
- County: Santa Clara
- Cities: San Jose (partially in Santa Clara)
- Established: 1795

The Alameda is a historic district of Central San Jose, California, west of Downtown San Jose. The district is centered on an alameda (Spanish for tree-lined street), a historic portion of El Camino Real connecting Downtown San Jose to Mission Santa Clara de Asís, and includes the smaller, surrounding neighborhoods to the north and east, like College Park and St. Leo's.

== History ==
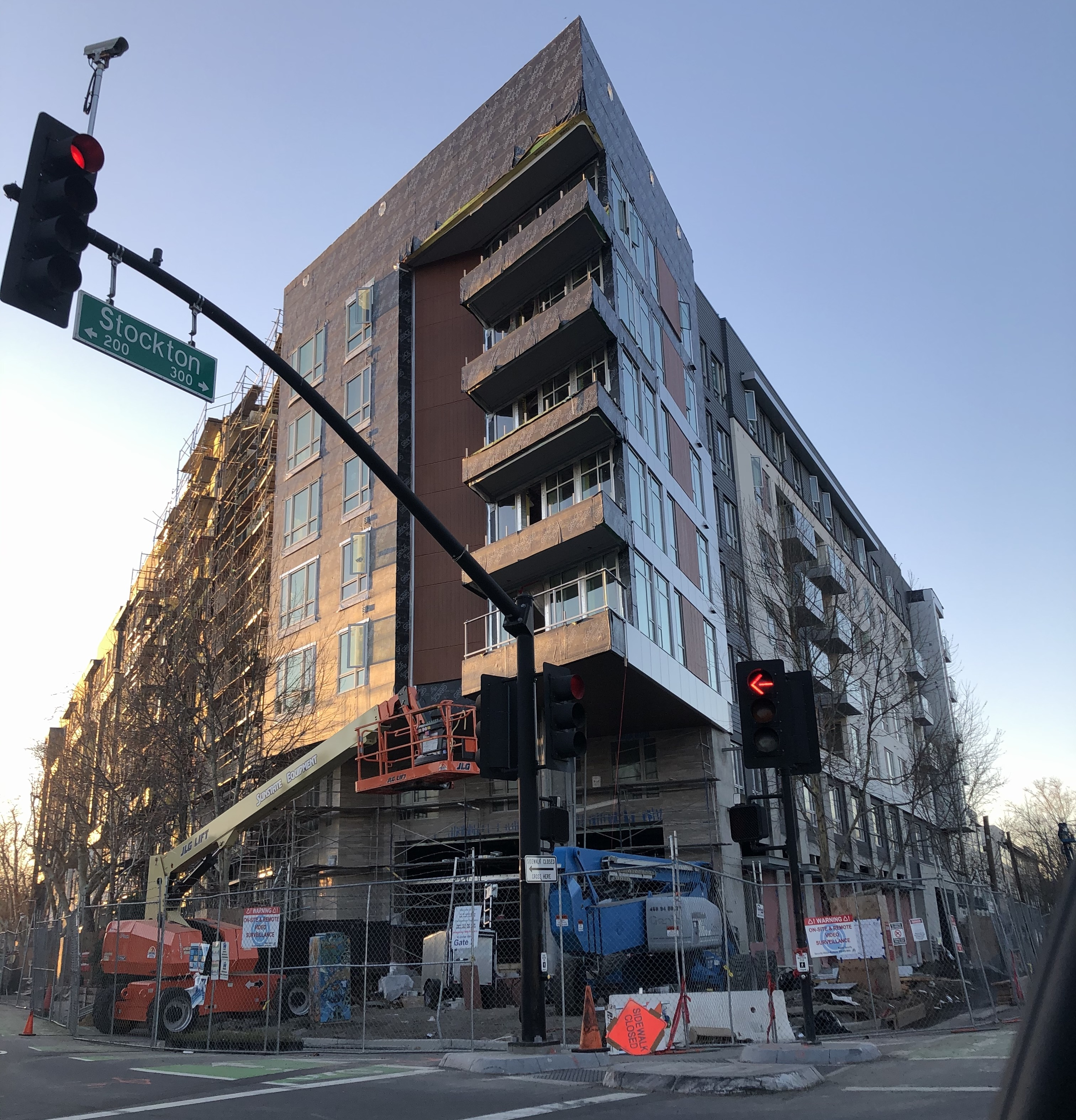
New construction on Stockton Ave.

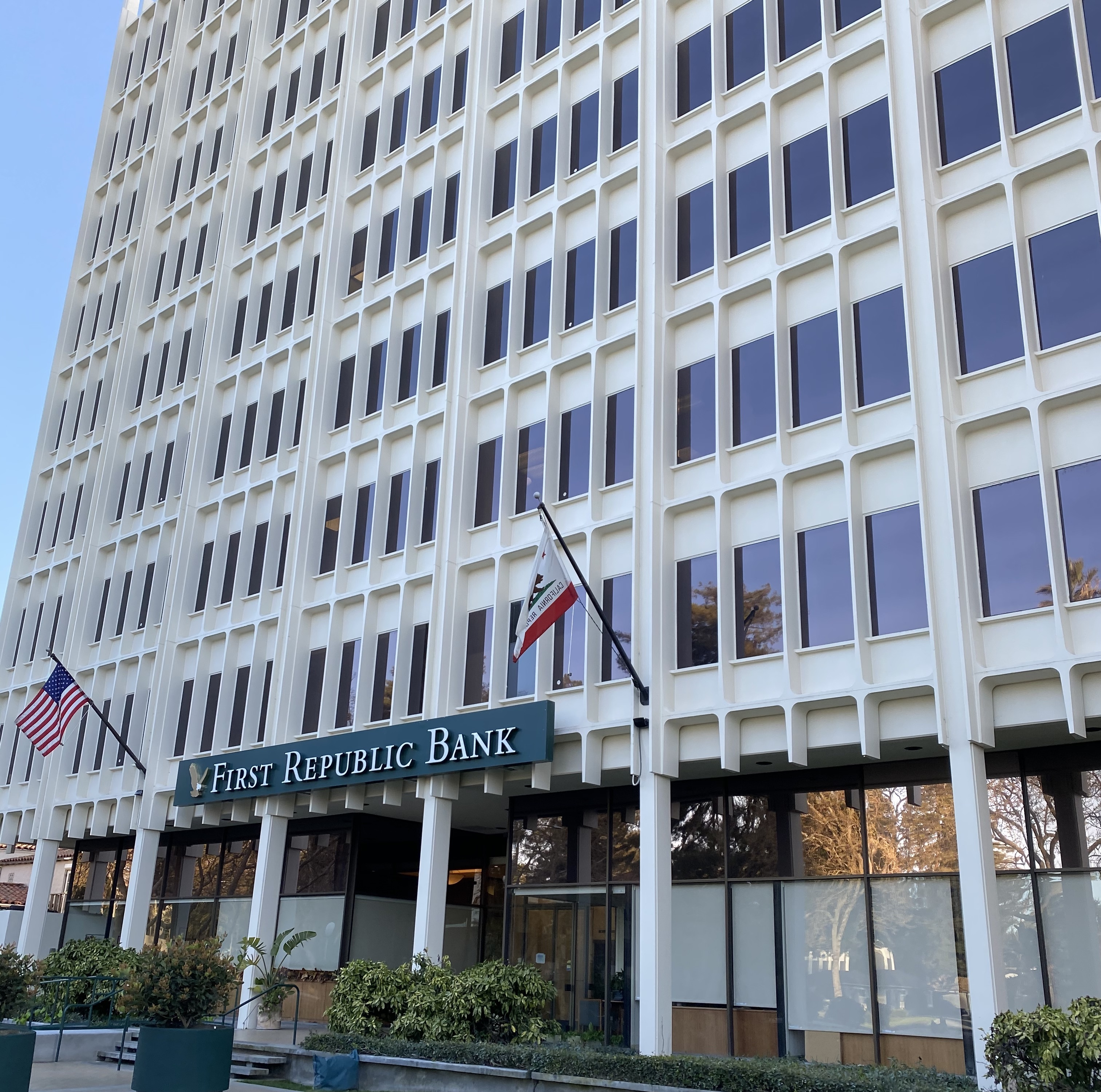
First Republic Bank Tower on The Alameda.

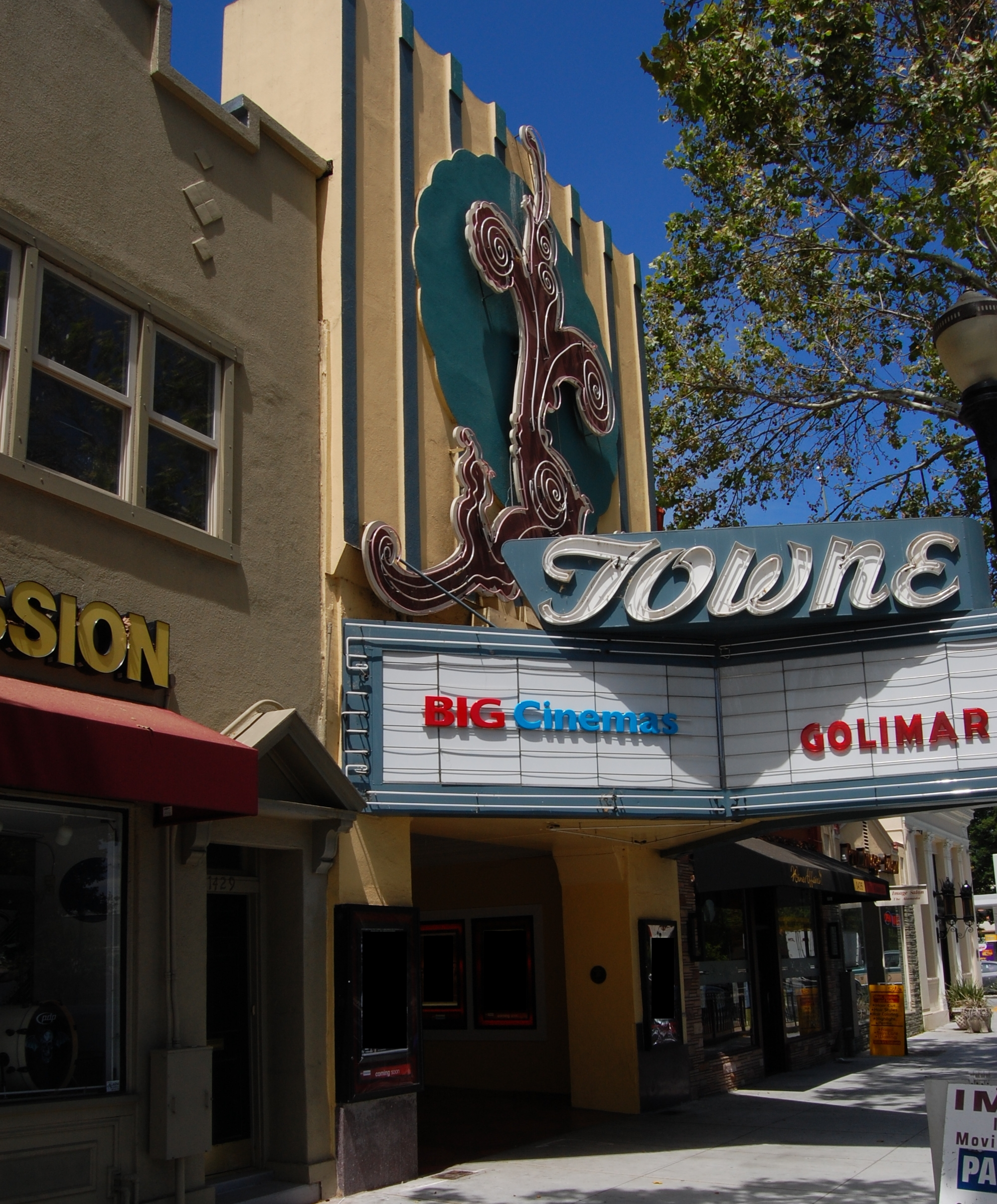
Historic Towne Theater.

The road was built beginning around 1795 by Native American neophytes at Mission Santa Clara de Asís on the orders of Father Magin Catalá to link the mission with El Pueblo de San José de Guadalupe (now the city of San Jose). Originally it had irrigation ditches on either side, bringing water from the Guadalupe River and Mission Creek to the fields and feeding a pond near the mission.

Willow trees were planted in multiple rows along the road in 1799; the last one was removed in 1982. The residents of the pueblo used the tree-lined path to attend Sunday Mass at the mission chapel prior to the construction of St. Joseph's Church.

The first stagecoach line in California ran between San Jose and San Francisco via the Alameda beginning in 1849. The San Jose and Santa Clara Railroad along the Alameda was the first interurban railroad in California when it opened with horsecars in 1868, and the second electric streetcar line in California (after that in San Diego) and the first interurban electric streetcar in the West when it reopened in 1888 with an underground third rail. It was converted to an overhead trolley in 1889.

In the late 19th and early 20th centuries, the Alameda attracted many wealthy residents who built mansions along it. The Dunne mansion on the corner of Emory Street, built in the 1890s, may be the oldest building on the street. Coachella Valley Church, lies north on the Alameda. It was built in the 1920s, and was owned by former San Jose mayor Dan W. Gray.

The Alameda was first paved in 1912.

=== Recent history ===
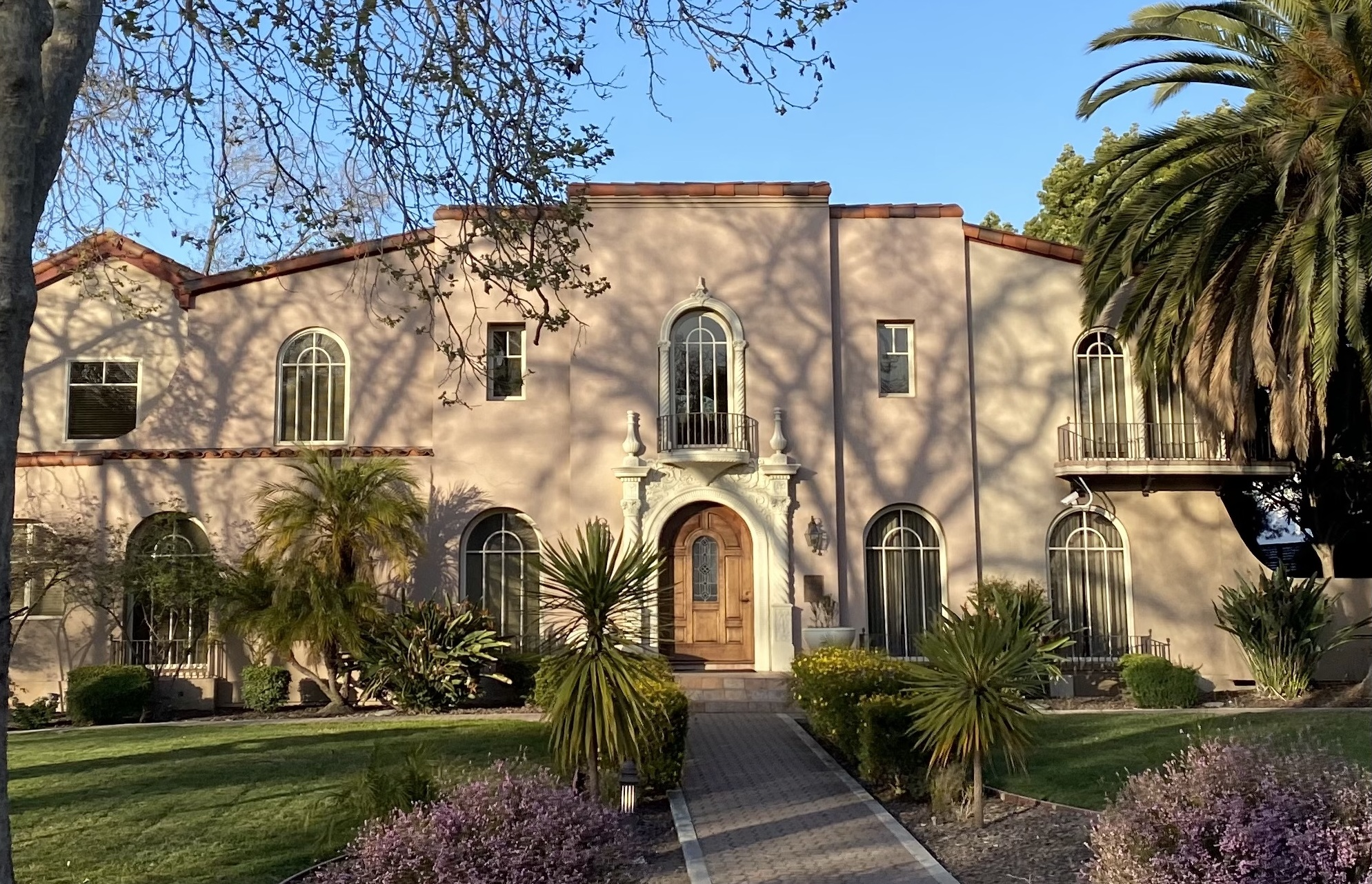
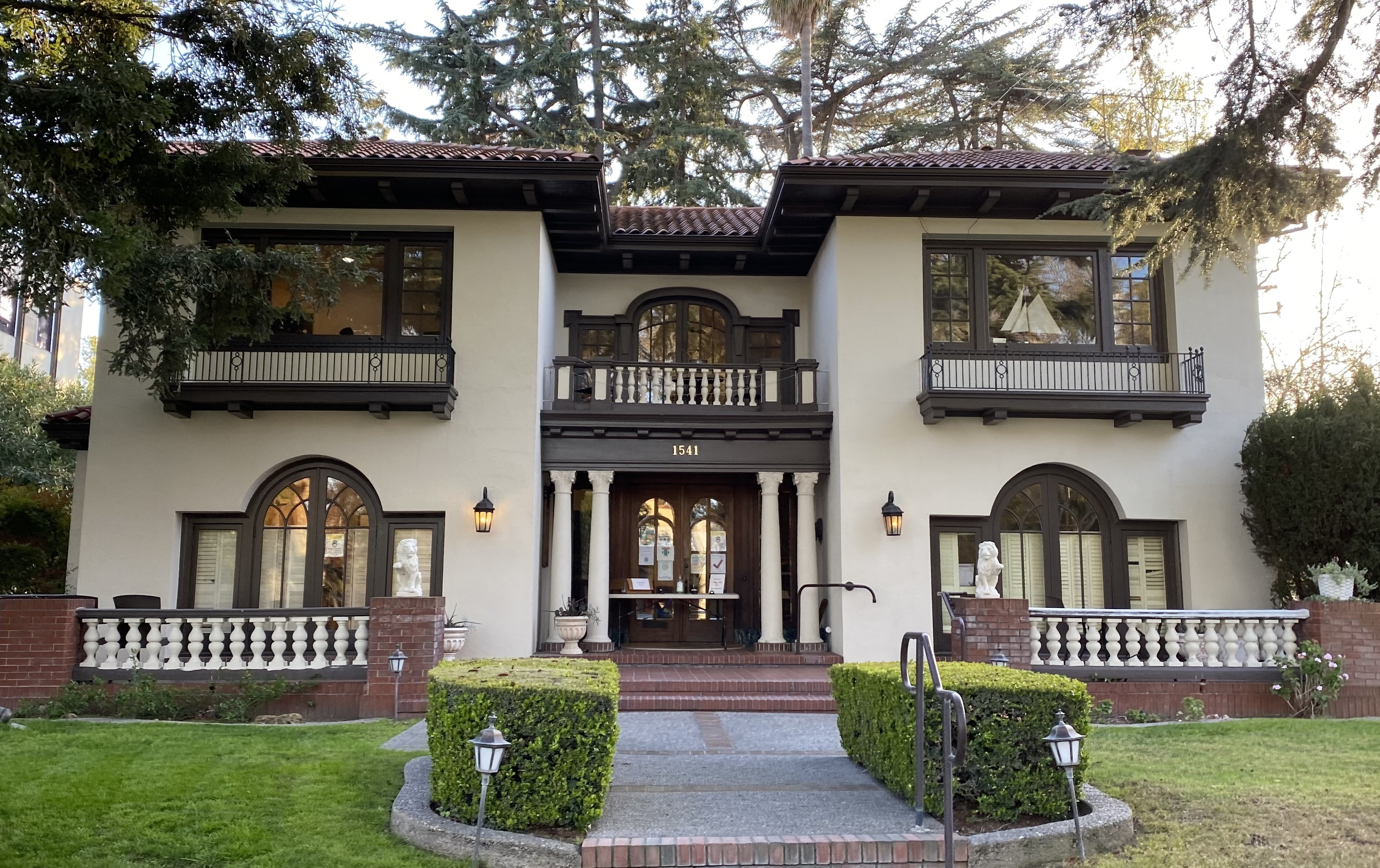
Most of the surviving historic mansions on The Alameda have been converted to offices.

The Alameda originally ran through the middle of the Santa Clara University campus, but the portion of the road through campus has been turned into a pedestrian path. El Camino Real branches off of the Alameda southeast of Santa Clara University; El Camino Real carries State Route 82 to bypass the campus. Brooke Hart, whose murder led to San Jose's most well-known lynching, lived with his family at 1717 The Alameda.

The Billy DeFrank Lesbian, Gay, Bisexual and Transgender Community Center is on the Alameda. There are gay and straight-oriented businesses nearby.

In 2006 the book The Alameda: The Beautiful Way by Shannon Clark was published that details the history of The Alameda.

== Geography ==
The Alameda is the name of both the street which forms a historic portion of El Camino Real and the surrounding district. It includes smaller neighborhoods including St. Leo's and College Park.

To the west/south of The Alameda is the district of Rose Garden and to the east is Downtown San Jose.

At its southeastern end (near the SAP Center), the Alameda turns into Santa Clara Street through Downtown San Jose and before turning into Alum Rock Avenue in East San Jose.

Cahill Park is located in the St. Leo's area of The Alameda.

== Architecture ==
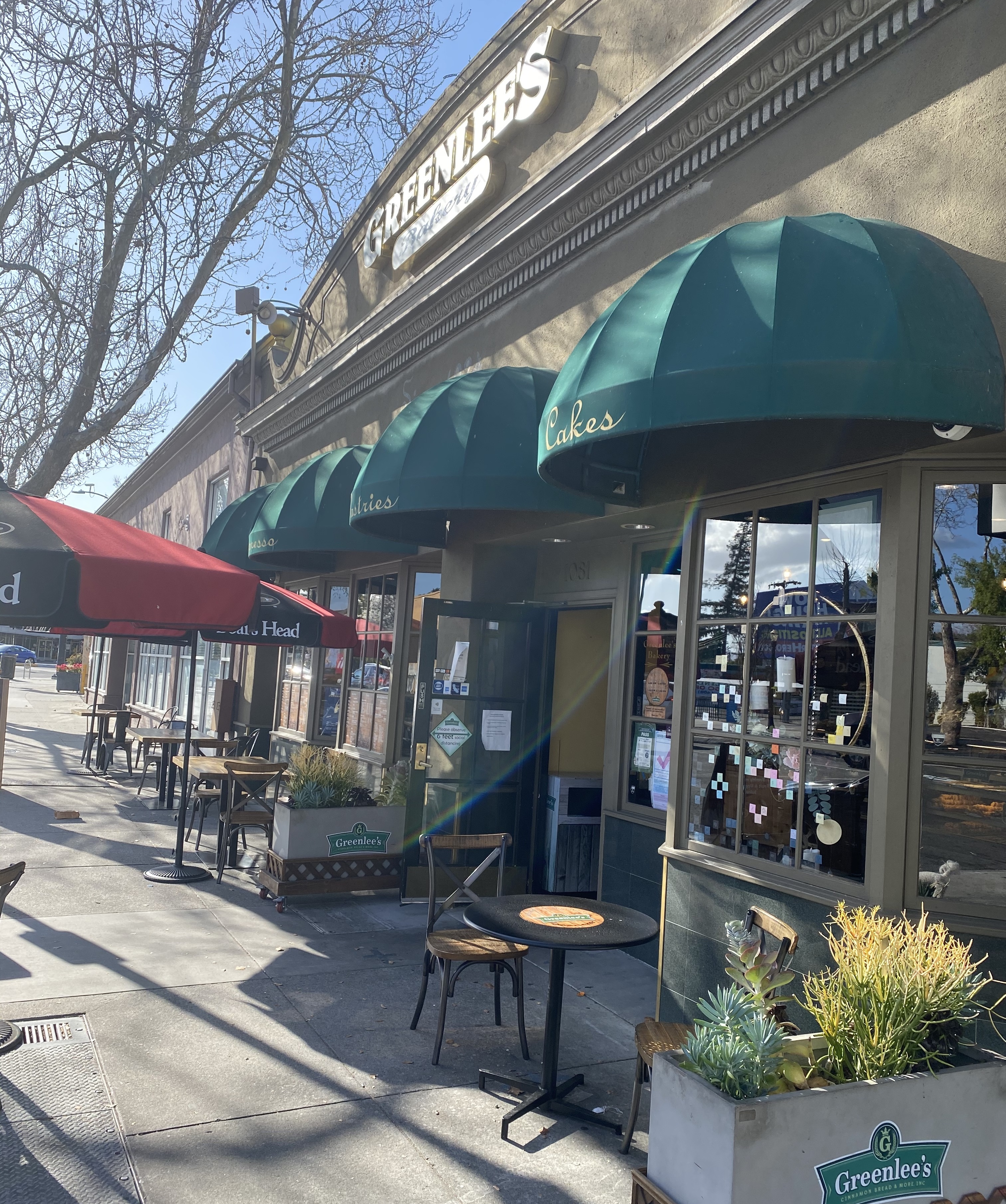
Historic Greenlee's Bakery

The Alameda is known for its historic architecture, with many examples of Californian architecture, including Spanish Colonial Revival, Californian Churrigueresque, Plateresque revival, Mission Revival architecture, amongst others.

=== Landmarks ===
- Coachella Valley Church
- Westminster Presbyterian Church
- Towne Theatre
- Greenlee's Bakery
- Schurra's Candies
- Hanchett Park Building
- Old Bank of Italy Branch
- Leib Carriage House

== Gallery ==
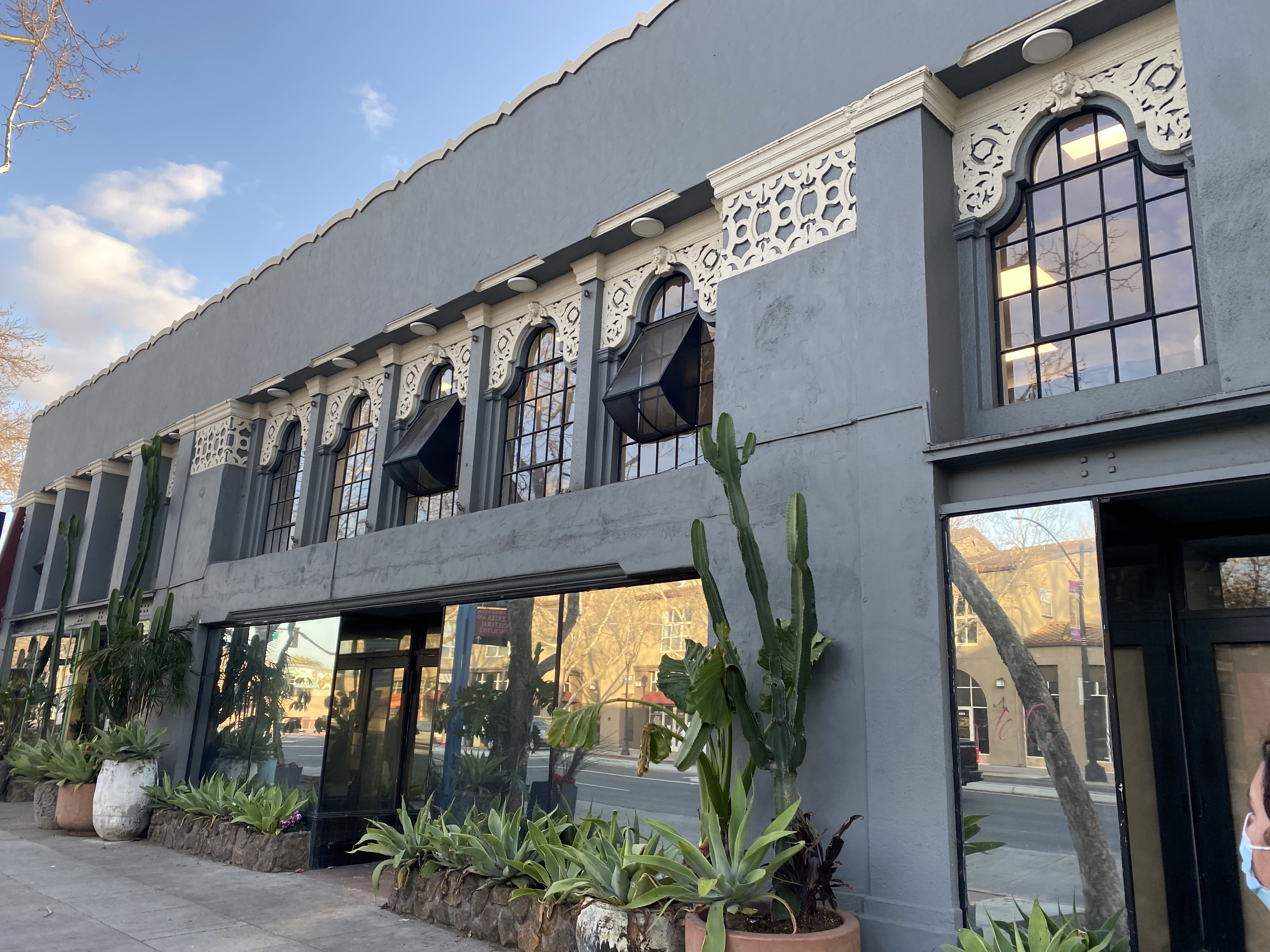
Californian Churrigueresque architecture

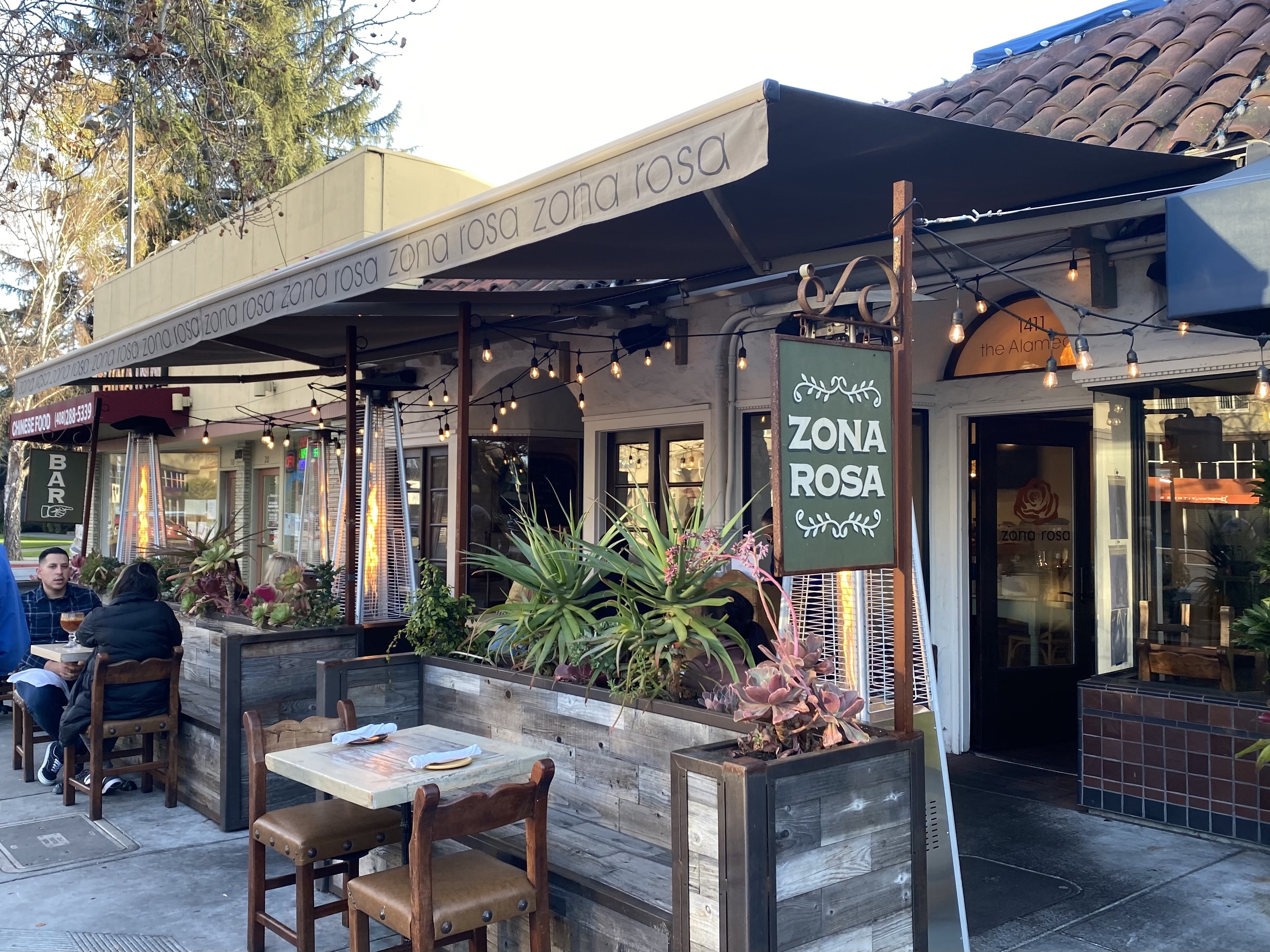
Zona Rosa

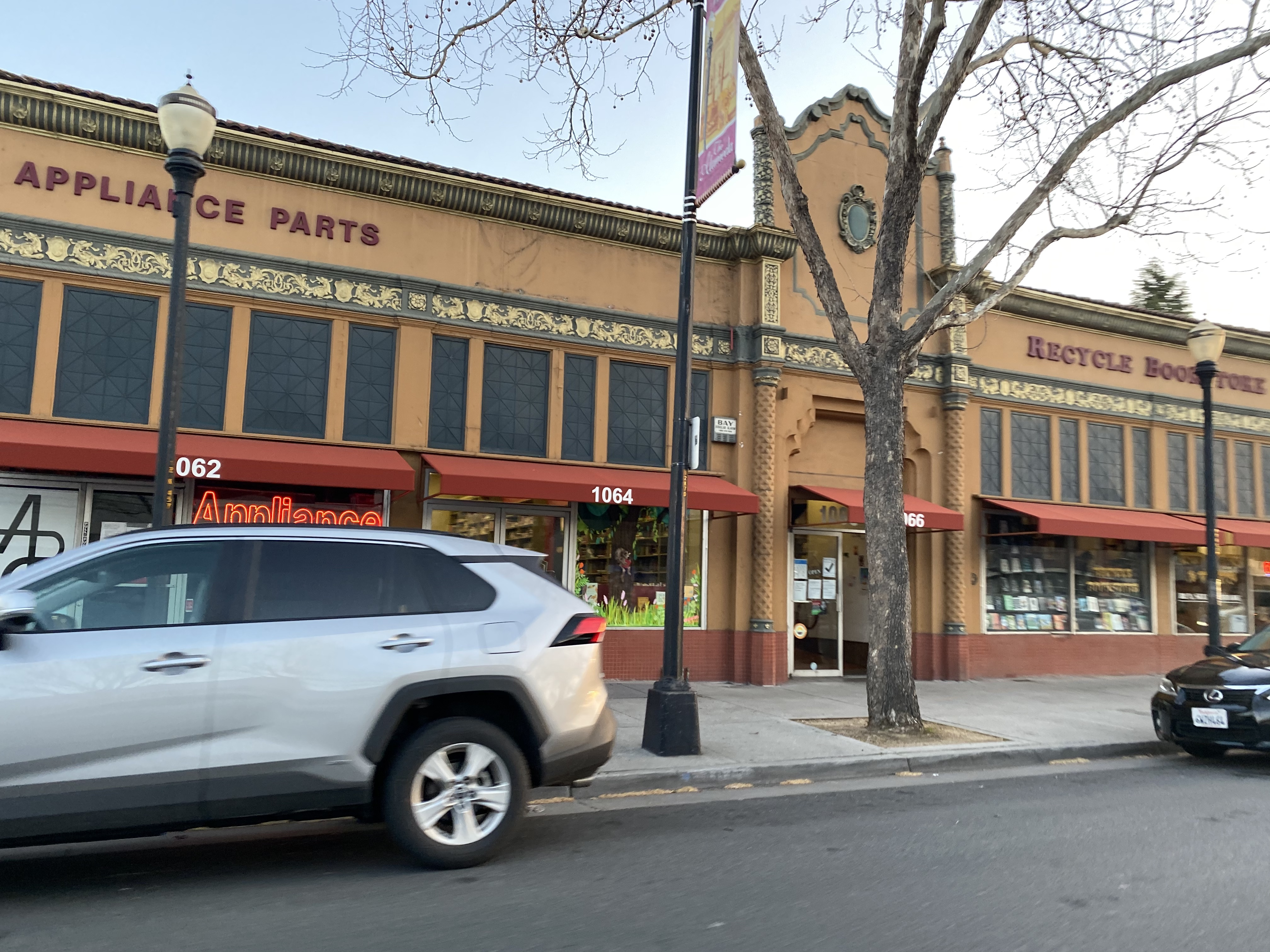
Spanish Colonial Revival architecture

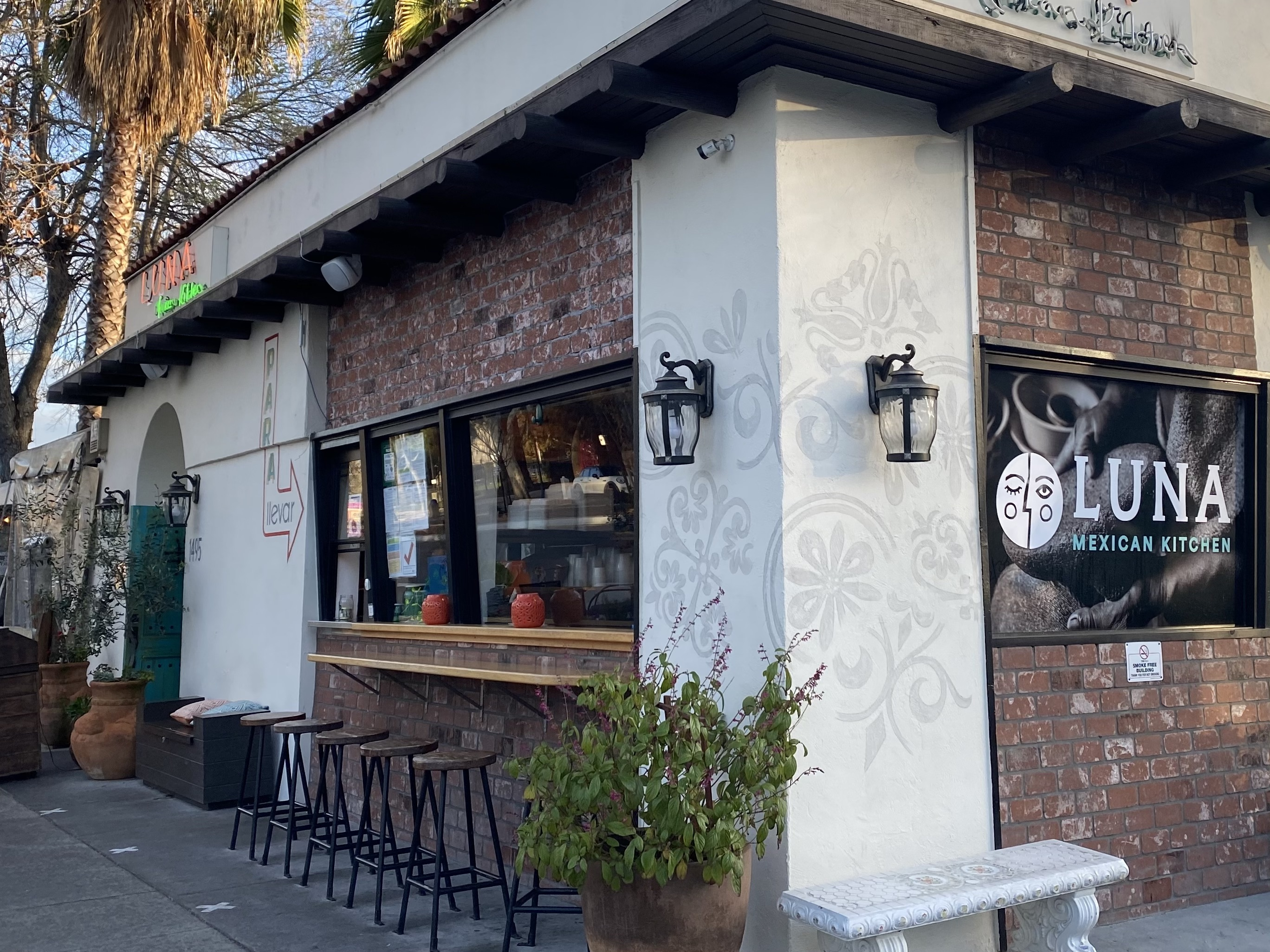
Luna Mexican Kitchen

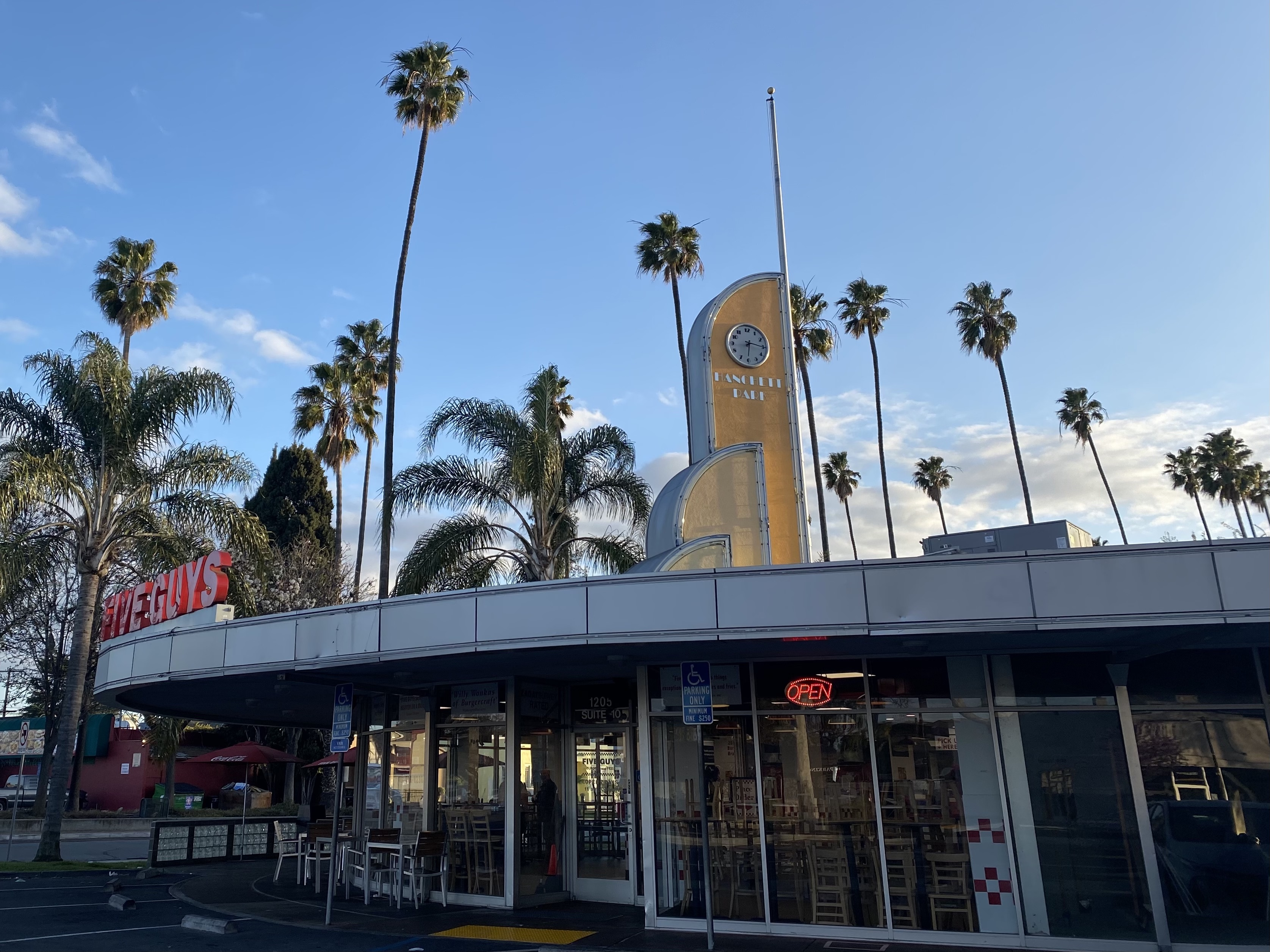
Hanchett Park Building

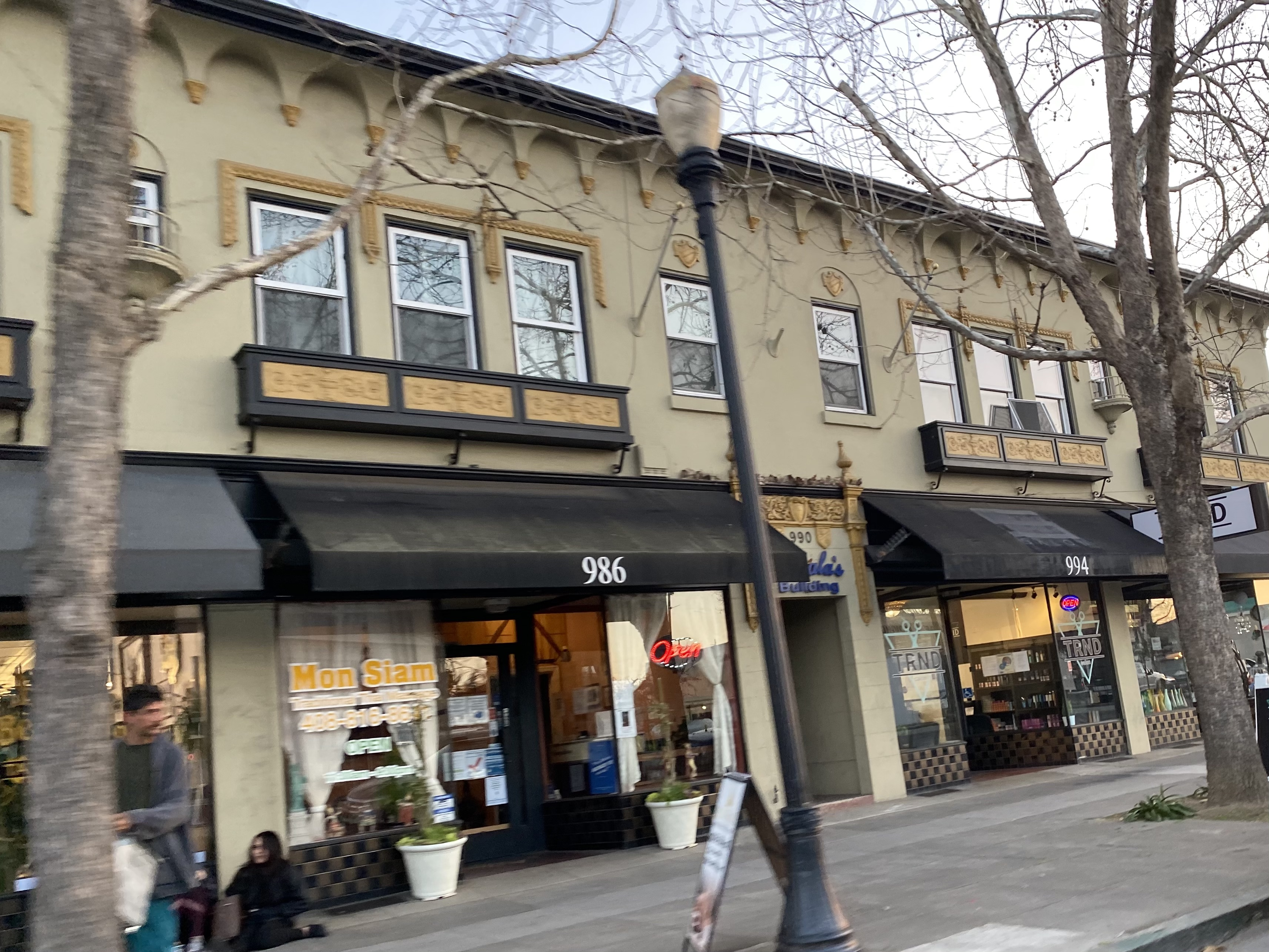
Zavala Building
