= Leib Carriage House =

- U.S. National Register of Historic Places
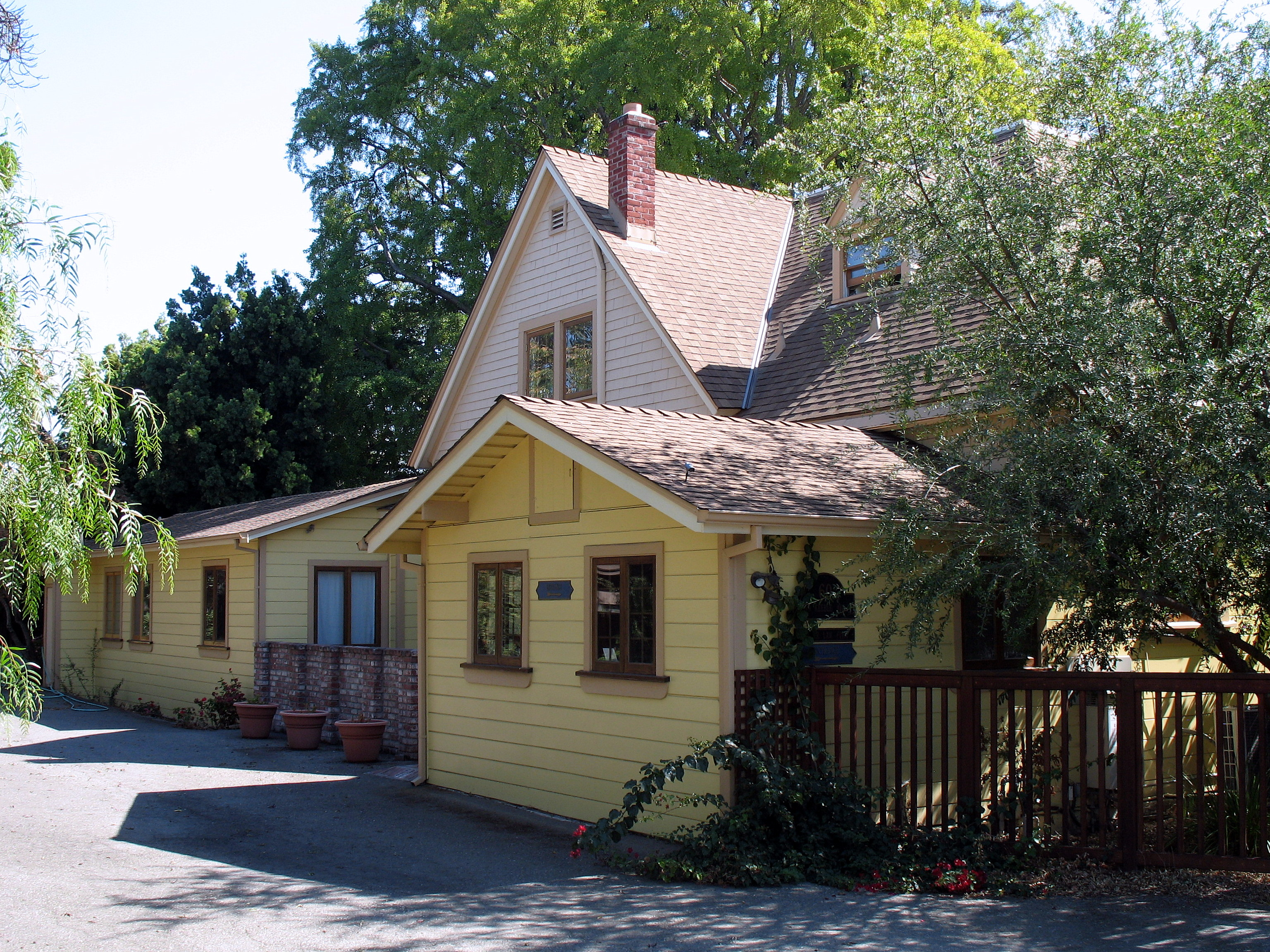

- Location within San Jose, California Location within California Location within the United States
- Location: 60 N. Keeble Ave., San Jose, California
- Coordinates: 37°19′59″N 121°54′29″W
- Area: less than one acre
- Built: 1899
- Architectural style: Shingle Style, Queen Anne
- NRHP reference No.: 80000866
- Added to NRHP: June 2, 1980

The Leib Carriage House is a historic building located at 60 N. Keeble Ave. in San Jose, California, in The Alameda district. The carriage house, owned by Judge Samuel Franklin Leib, was built in the 1870s as the Garden Alameda area was being developed. The estate and original home are gone, but the carriage house is listed on the National Register of Historic Places. Fuller Law Firm is the current owner of the property.

Samuel Franklin Leib was a successful San Jose attorney whose clients included Mrs. Sarah Winchester and Mrs. Jane Stanford.
