= Billy DeFrank Lesbian, Gay, Bisexual and Transgender Community Center =

Community center for LGBT people in San Jose, California

Billy DeFrank LGBTQ+ Community Center
- Formation: 1 March 1981; 45 years ago
- Type: Nonprofit
- Legal status: registered 501(c)(3) nonprofit organization
- Headquarters: San Jose
- Website: www.defrank.org

The Billy DeFrank LGBTQ+ Community Center (formerly the Billy DeFrank Lesbian, Gay, Bisexual, and Transgender Community Center) is a non-profit organization that promotes services for and about the LGBT community of San Jose and Santa Clara County, California. The mission statement of the DeFrank Center is to provide "community, leadership, advocacy, services and support to the Silicon Valley’s LGBTQ+ People and their Allies."

== Name ==
The Billy DeFrank LGBTQ+ Community Center is named after Billy DeFrank, the stage name of William Price (1936–1980), an African-American and prominent 1970s gay rights activist and a member of the Bay Area's drag community. In 2021, to commemorate the DeFrank Center's 40th anniversary, artist Serge Gay Jr. painted a mural on the side of the DeFrank Center that features a portrait of DeFrank.

== History ==
The Billy DeFrank Lesbian and Gay Community Center opened on March 1, 1981, in a two-room storefront on Keyes St. in south downtown San Jose, a year after Santa Clara County residents voted to repeal ordinances extending housing and employment protections to lesbians and gay men. The new DeFrank Center emerged from a desire to respond to that setback.

The DeFrank Center was the meeting place for several activist groups, include High Tech Gays, which brought the High Tech Gays v. Defense Industrial Security Clearance Office suit in 1984 arguing that the U.S. Department of Defense should not deny security clearances to applicants who were known or thought to be homosexual. The DeFrank Center was also one of the original meeting places of Bay Area Municipal Elections Committee (BAYMEC), a PAC that advocates for the civil rights of LGBTQ people.

In subsequent years, the DeFrank Center expanded to serve a large and diverse community. It moved location several times within San Jose before landing at its current location on The Alameda in San Jose's gay-friendly St Leo neighborhood. In 2016, the street in front of the center became the site of San Jose's first rainbow-striped crosswalk.

To commemorate World AIDS Day on December 1, 2023, the DeFrank Center displayed several panels of the AIDS Memorial Quilt.

== Services ==
From all around the nine counties of the Bay Area, the DeFrank Center provides resources to lesbian, gay, bisexual and transgender people of all ages and backgrounds. Each month more than a thousand people visit the DeFrank Center. Their online newsletter has over 6,000 subscribers. The DeFrank Center has events, activities, and support groups every week. They also provide HIV testing, a cyber center, a library, and art exhibits.

== See also ==
- List of LGBT community centers
