= Cahill Park =

Park in San Jose, California, US

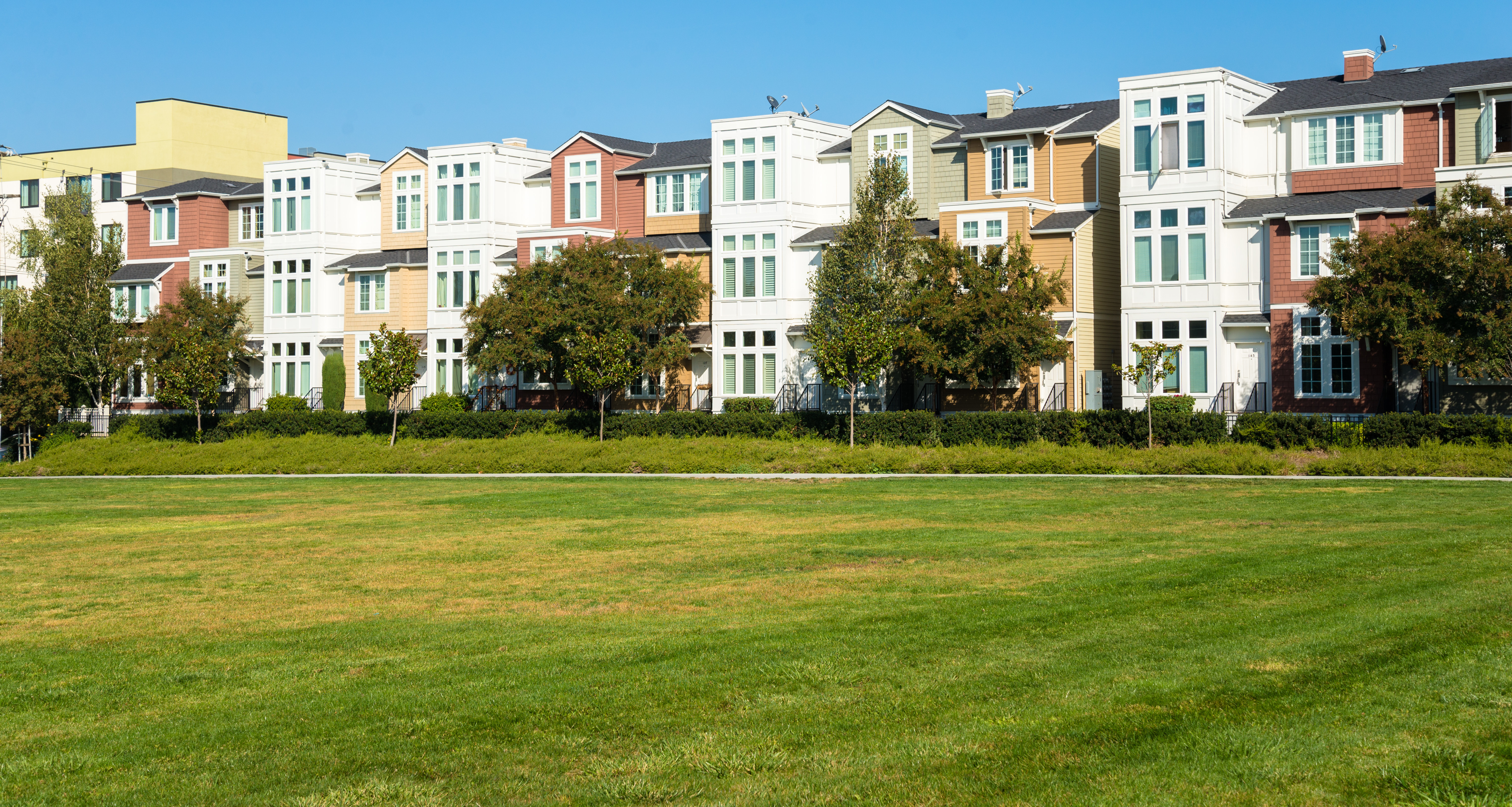
- Interactive map of Cahill Park
- Location: San Jose, California
- Coordinates: 37.3288°N 121.9051°W
- Area: 4 acres (1.6 ha)
- Public transit: Diridon

Cahill Park is a park in San Jose, California, located in the St. Leo's neighborhood of The Alameda district, immediately west of Diridon Station in Downtown San Jose.

== History ==
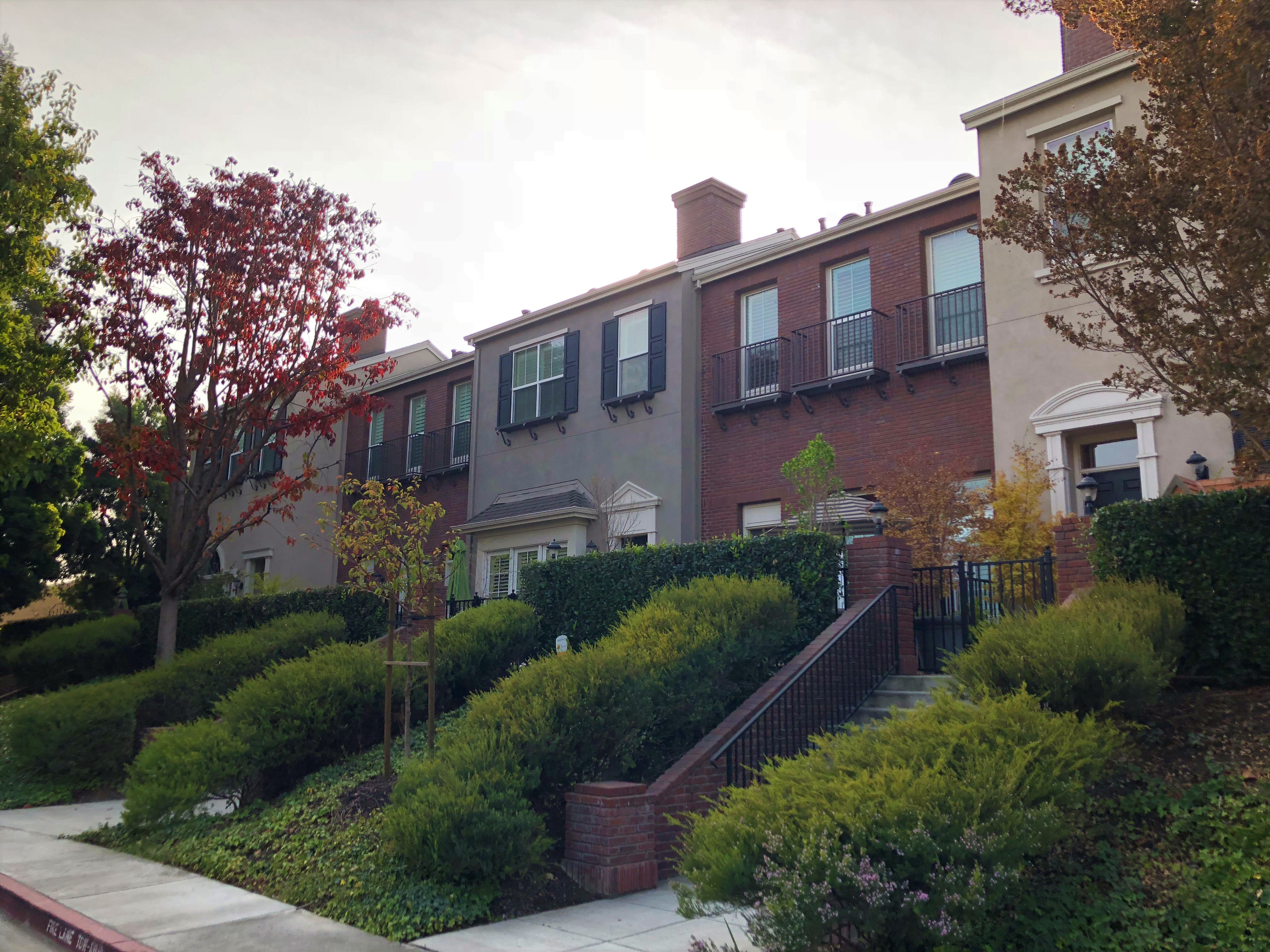
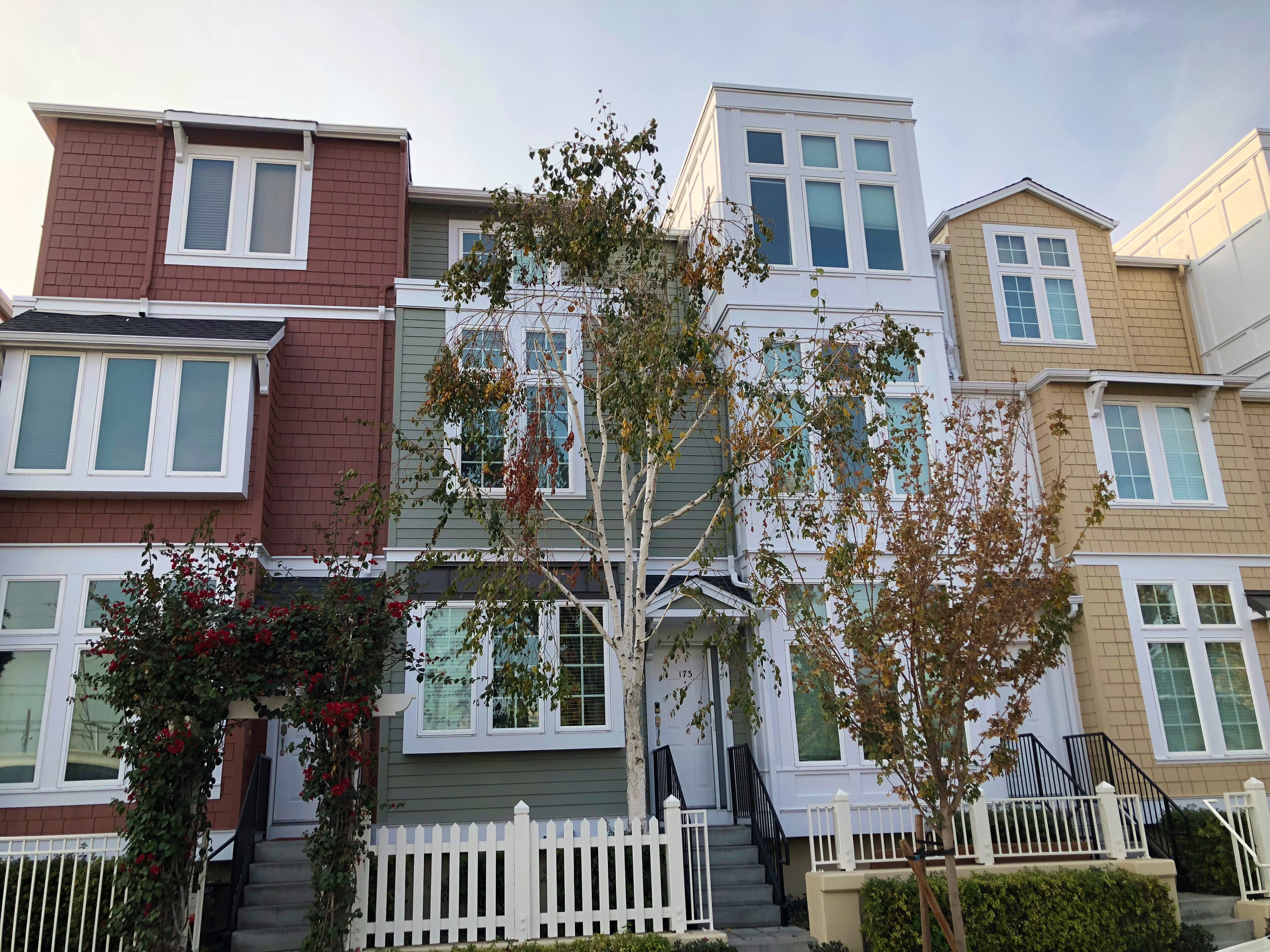
Townhouses on Cahill Park

Cahill park was deeded to the city in 2003.

The park is named after Hiram B. Cahill, who originally owned the land where the park and nearby Diridon Station (formerly Cahill Depot). Hiram's widow, Mary Welch Cahill, eventually sold the land to Southern Pacific Railroad with the request that the station they erect be named in his memory.

The Cahill Park is one of the affected stakeholders in Google's planned revitalization of the Diridon area of Downtown San Jose.

== Location ==
Cahill Park is located in the St. Leo's neighborhood of The Alameda, the district immediately to the west of Diridon Station in Downtown San Jose.

== See also ==
- Diridon Station
