= Saint-Léon =

Saint-Léon may refer to the following:

== Places ==
France

- Saint-Léon, Allier, a commune in the department of Allier
- Saint-Léon, Haute-Garonne, a commune in the department of Haute-Garonne
- Saint-Léon, Gironde, a commune in the department of Gironde
- Saint-Léon, Lot-et-Garonne, a commune in the department of Lot-et-Garonne
- Saint-Léon-d'Issigeac, a commune in the department of Dordogne
- Saint-Léon-sur-l'Isle, a commune in the department of Dordogne
- Saint-Léon-sur-Vézère, a commune in the department of Dordogne
- Saint-Léon, a hamlet, part of the commune of Merléac, Côtes-d'Armor

Quebec, Canada

- Saint-Léon-le-Grand, Bas-Saint-Laurent, Quebec, a municipality in the Bas-Saint-Laurent region
- Saint-Léon-le-Grand, Mauricie, Quebec, a municipality in the Mauricie region
  - Saint-Léon-de-Standon, Quebec, a municipality in the Chaudière-Appalaches region

== People ==
- Arthur Saint-Leon, (1821-1870) ballet choreographer

== See also ==
- St. Leon (disambiguation)
