= Saint Leo the Great School (San Jose) =

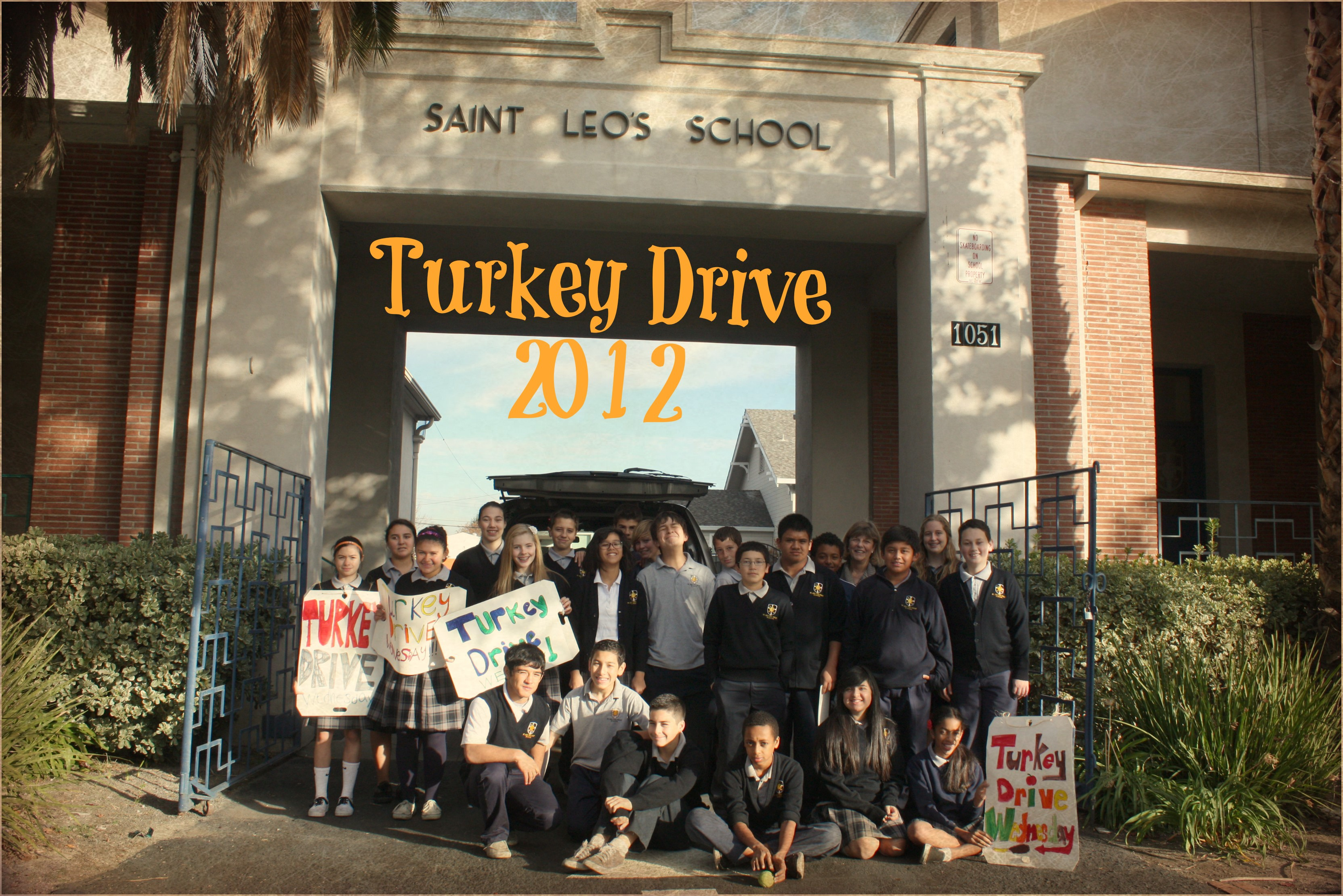

Location
- 1051 West San Fernando Street; San Jose, California 95126; United States; 37.32919°N 121.910662°W

Information
- Type: Private, coeducational
- Religious affiliation: Diocese of San Jose
- Patron saint: Pope Leo I
- Established: 1915
- Superintendent: Jennifer Beltramo
- Principal: Matt Komar
- Pastor: Rev. Enzie Lagattuta
- Faculty: 40 lay
- Grades: Preschool-8
- Enrollment: 307 (2012-2013)
- Average class size: 25
- Student to teacher ratio: 8.125:1
- Campus size: 3.28 acres (13,300 m^{2})
- Campus type: Urban
- Colors: Blue and gold
- Athletics: 20 teams in 5 sports
- Athletics conference: Diocese of San Jose
- Mascot: Leo the Lion
- Nickname: Lions
- Accreditation: Western Association of Schools and Colleges
- Yearbook: Lion Pride
- Tuition: US$9,875 (2018-2019)
- Athletic Director: Joe Ramirez
- Website: stleosj.org

Saint Leo the Great School is a private Catholic school (pre-k to 8th) located in the St. Leo's neighborhood of central San Jose, California. Founded in 1915, the school is associated with the Saint Leo the Great Church, and located on its campus.

== History ==
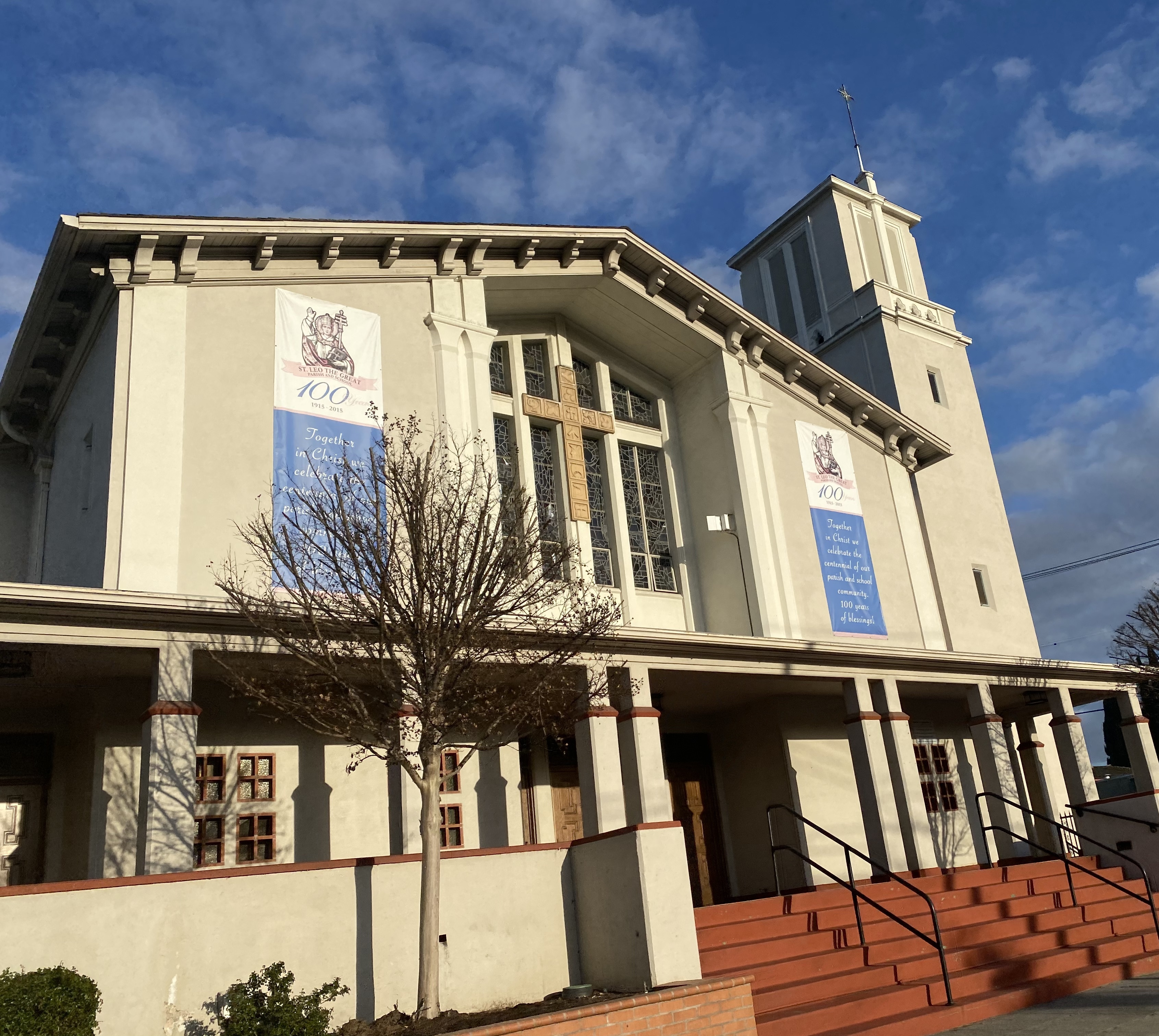
Saint Leo the Great Church, located in the St. Leo's neighborhood of Central San Jose.

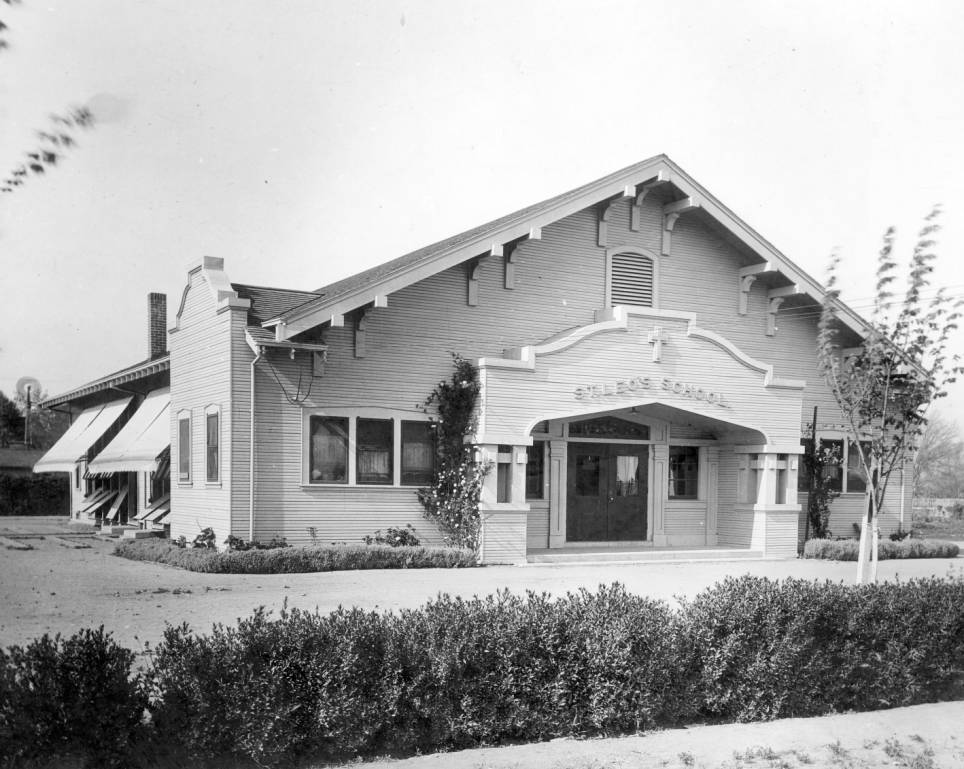
Original school building

St. Leo the Great School was originally begun by the Sisters of Notre Dame de Namur of Amiens, France and opened in 1915 with 90 students. Tuition was $2 per year. The original school building is still used today as the preschool, gym, parish hall and kitchen. In 1919 the Sisters of Notre Dame were supervising six schools, the others being Notre Dame College, Notre Dame high School, St. Joseph, St. Francis Xavier, and St. Mary.

In 1925 the Sisters of Notre Dame closed the school; there were then eight grades and 200 students.

In 1927 the Reverend Henry J. Lyne reopened the school with the support of the Sisters of Charity of the Blessed Virgin Mary.

St. Leo students won the Bellarmine College Preparatory four-year scholarship in 1937 (Franklin Lawrence) 1938 (Dick Wehner), 1939 (Robert Wehner), 1940 (Louis Mattiesen), and 1940 (Walter E. Rankin, Jr; the third consecutive year a St. Leo student scored top marks on the exam).

A new school building was built in 1950 to accommodate the school's 445 students, and the original building was converted into a gym.

In 1984 Principal Sister Dorita Clifford, BVM, was mentioned in the New York Times for her early adoption of computers at the school.

In 1985, the Sisters of Charity of the Blessed Virgin Mary turned over school administration to the lay staff of the Diocese of San Jose's department of education. In 1994, their convent home was turned over to the school for use as extended care and office space.

The gym was remodeled in 2006. In 2007, a "Little Lions" preschool was added for three and four-year-olds. It was the first school in the diocese to have a preschool. This is now the pre-kindergarten program.

== Academics ==
The school is part of the Diocese of San Jose and accredited through WASC and WCEA.

== Graduates ==
St. Leo students graduating 8th grade usually go on to the following high schools:

- Archbishop Mitty High School - a coed Diocesan Catholic High School
- Bellarmine College Preparatory - an all-boys Jesuit Catholic High School
- Lincoln High School - a San Jose unified public coed High School
- Notre Dame High School - an all-girls Notre Dame de Namur Catholic High School
- Presentation High School - an all-girls Presentation Sister Catholic High School
- Valley Christian High School - a coed interdenominational Christian High School
- Willow Glen High School - a San Jose unified public coed High School
- Cristo Rey San Jose Jesuit - a coed work-study High School
