= Livity (spiritual concept) =

Rastafarian concept

Livity is the Rastafari concept of righteous, everliving living. Its essence is the realization that an energy, or life force, conferred by Jah (God), exists within, and flows through, all people and all living things. This is seen as the presence of Jah living within humans and is often expressed in Rastafari vocabulary as "I and I", where the first "I" refers to the Almighty, the second "I" to oneself. A primary goal in Rastafari meditation is maintaining awareness of I and I.

A primary goal in a Rasta's life is to expand their livity. In Rastafari philosophy, livity can be enhanced by intense prayer and meditation (often enhanced by sacramental cannabis use), adherence to an Ital diet, and perhaps most importantly, loving behavior toward others. Livity has a strong focus on living a natural lifestyle that includes the consumption of natural foods and growth of natural hair. This expression of love for others is done in recognition of a central love energy within all people, a concept often referred to as "One Love".
