= Saint Leo the Great School (Pennsylvania) =

School in Lancaster, Pennsylvania

Coordinates: 40.0555°N 76.3666°W

Saint Leo the Great Catholic School
- 2427 Marietta Avenue; Lancaster, Pennsylvania 17601; United States

Information
- Type: Private elementary
- Motto: We Are The Lions!
- Established: 1965
- School district: Hempfield School District
- Principal: Christine McLean
- Staff: 23
- Faculty: 14
- Grades: Preschool - 8th grade
- Enrollment: Approx. 300
- Colors: Green and gold
- Athletics: Basketball, baseball, softball, cheerleading
- Athletics conference: CYO
- Mascot: Leo (the Lion)
- Affiliation: Roman Catholic
- Information: (717) 392-2441
- Website: stleoschool.org

Saint Leo the Great School is a Roman Catholic elementary school in Lancaster, Pennsylvania, United States. It is located at 2427 Marietta Ave, Lancaster, PA 17601
