= Saint Leo the Great Church =

Coordinates: 37°19′44″N 121°54′41″W

St. Leo the Great Church
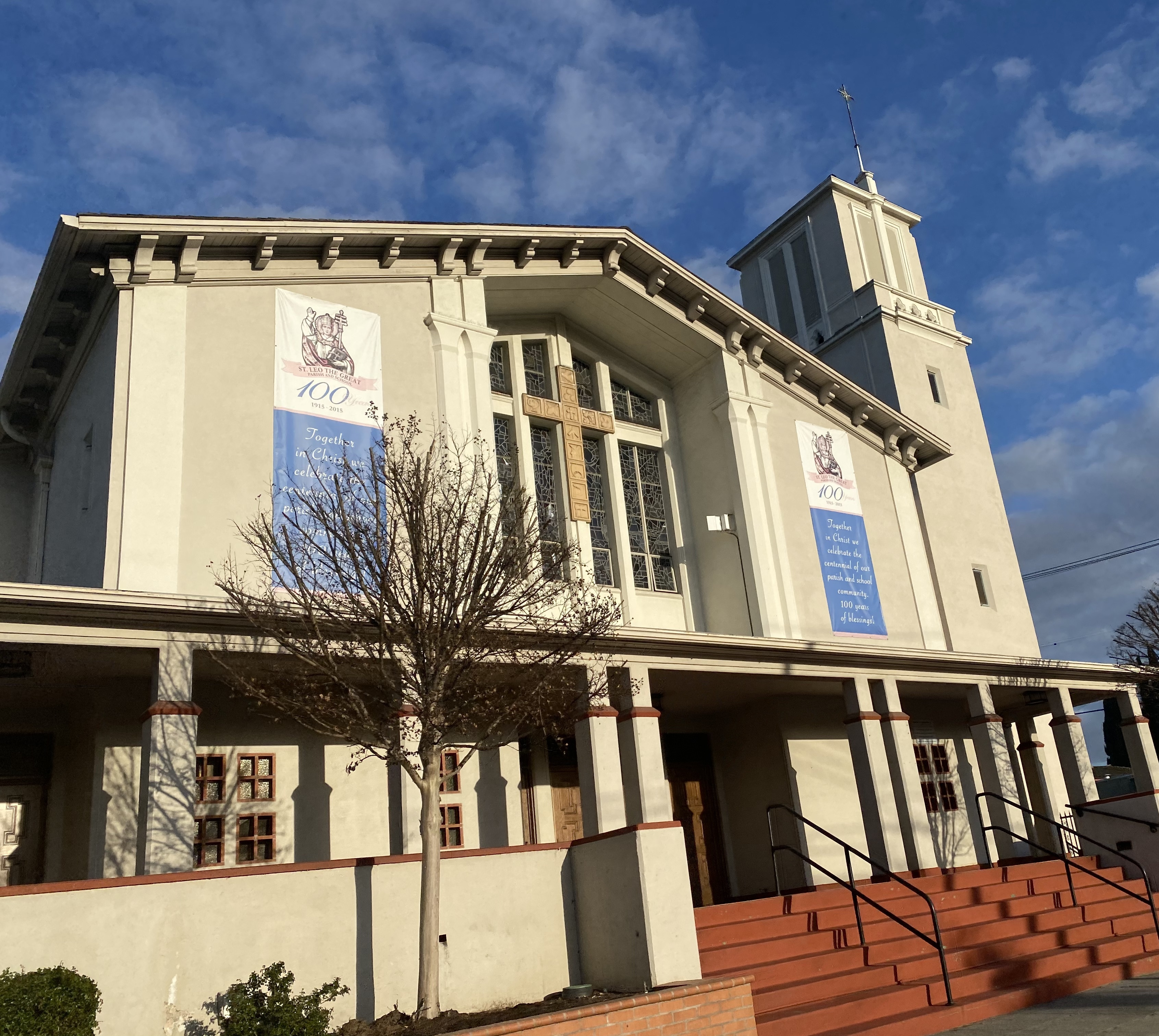
- St. Leo the Great Church
- Location: St. Leo's, San Jose, California
- Country: USA
- Denomination: Roman Catholic
- Website: stleochurchsj.org/

Administration
- Archdiocese: Archidioecesis Sancti Francisci
- Diocese: Dioecesis Sancti Josephi in California
- Deanery: Deanery 5

Clergy
- Bishop: The Most Rev. Oscar Cantú

Saint Leo the Great Church is a Roman Catholic church in the St. Leo's neighborhood of San Jose, California. Founded in 1923, it is a territorial parish of the Roman Catholic Diocese of San Jose in California and named for Pope Leo I, a Doctor of the Church.

== History ==
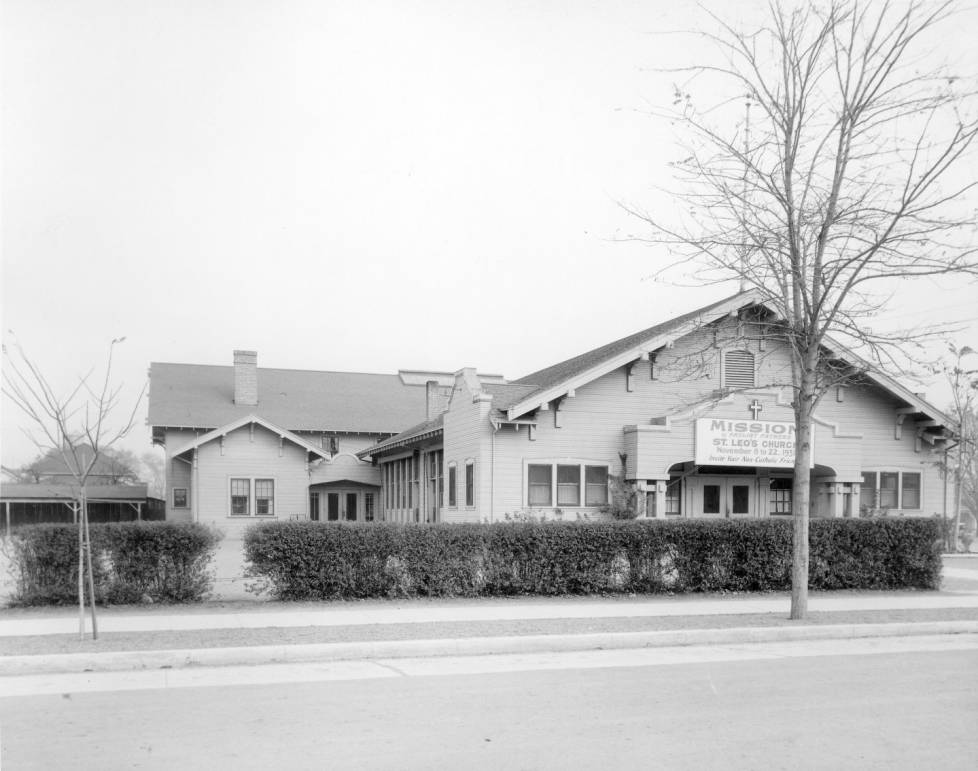
The original St Leo the Great Church, in 1931.

The second church replaced the original building in 1953 The first church was built in 1926 as seen in this photo taken by John C. Gordon in 1931.

The second church replaced the original building in 1953

== School ==
St. Leo the Great Parish operates Saint Leo the Great School that serves families of the Diocese of San Jose, from PreKindergarten to eighth grade. The namesake of the surrounding St. Leo's neighborhood of San Jose, California is named after the school which was established in 1915 by the Sisters of Notre Dame.

== Description ==
The church has 2 organs. A 300 pipe organ in the choir loft and a smaller Yamaha US1-C at the front of the church.

== See also ==
- Roman Catholic Diocese of San Jose in California
