= St. Leo's, San Jose =

St. Leo's
- Neighborhood of San Jose
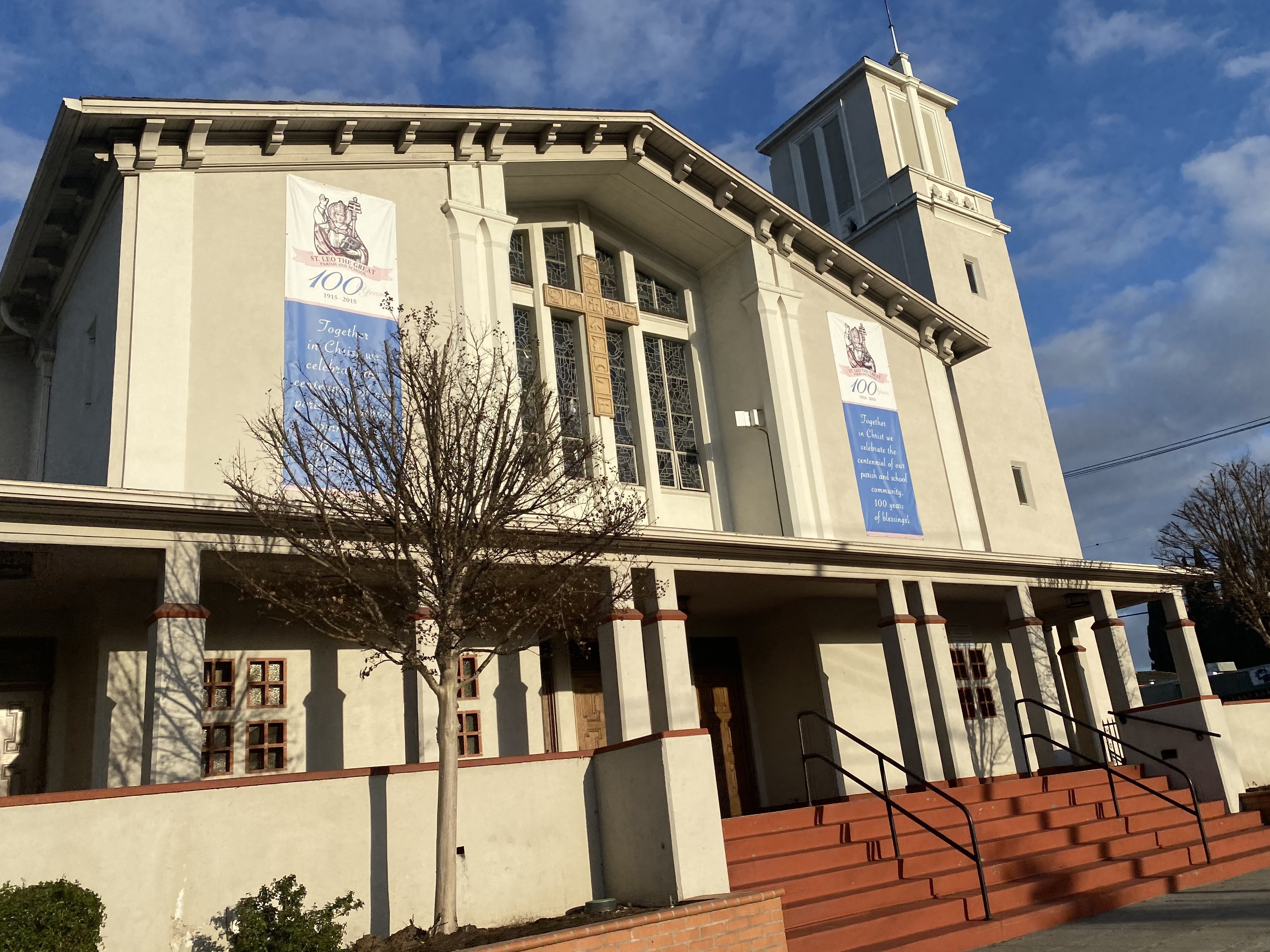
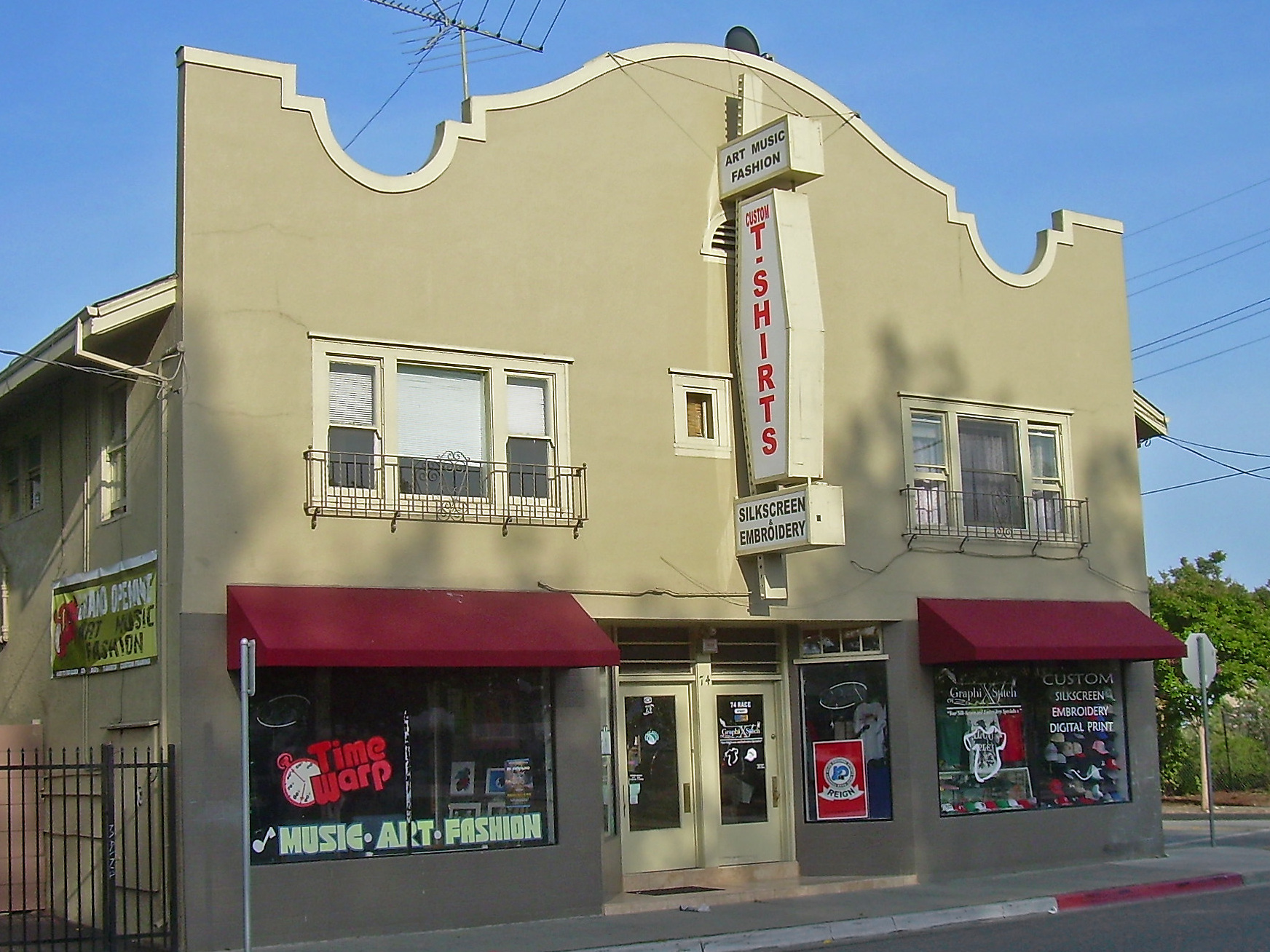
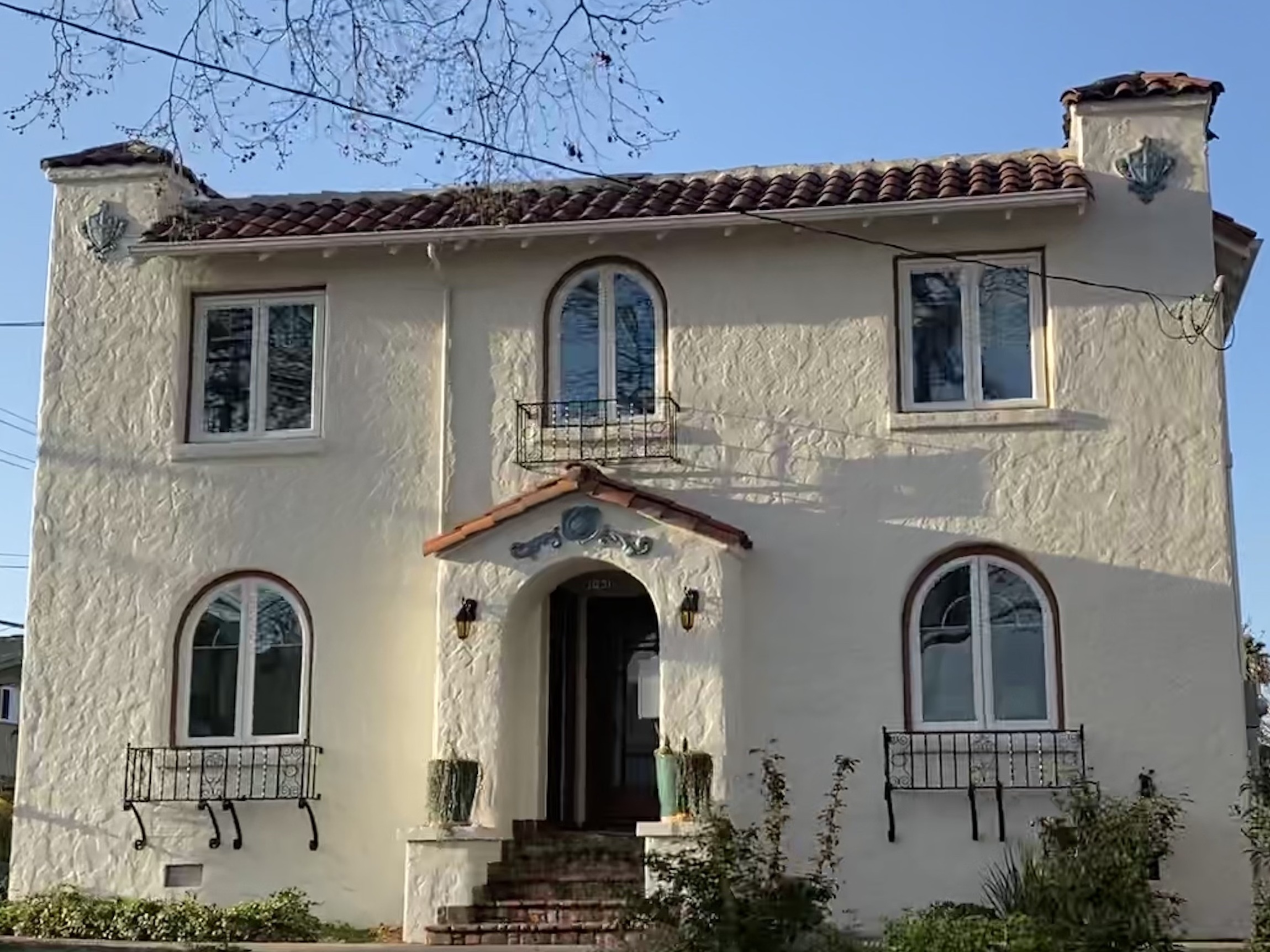
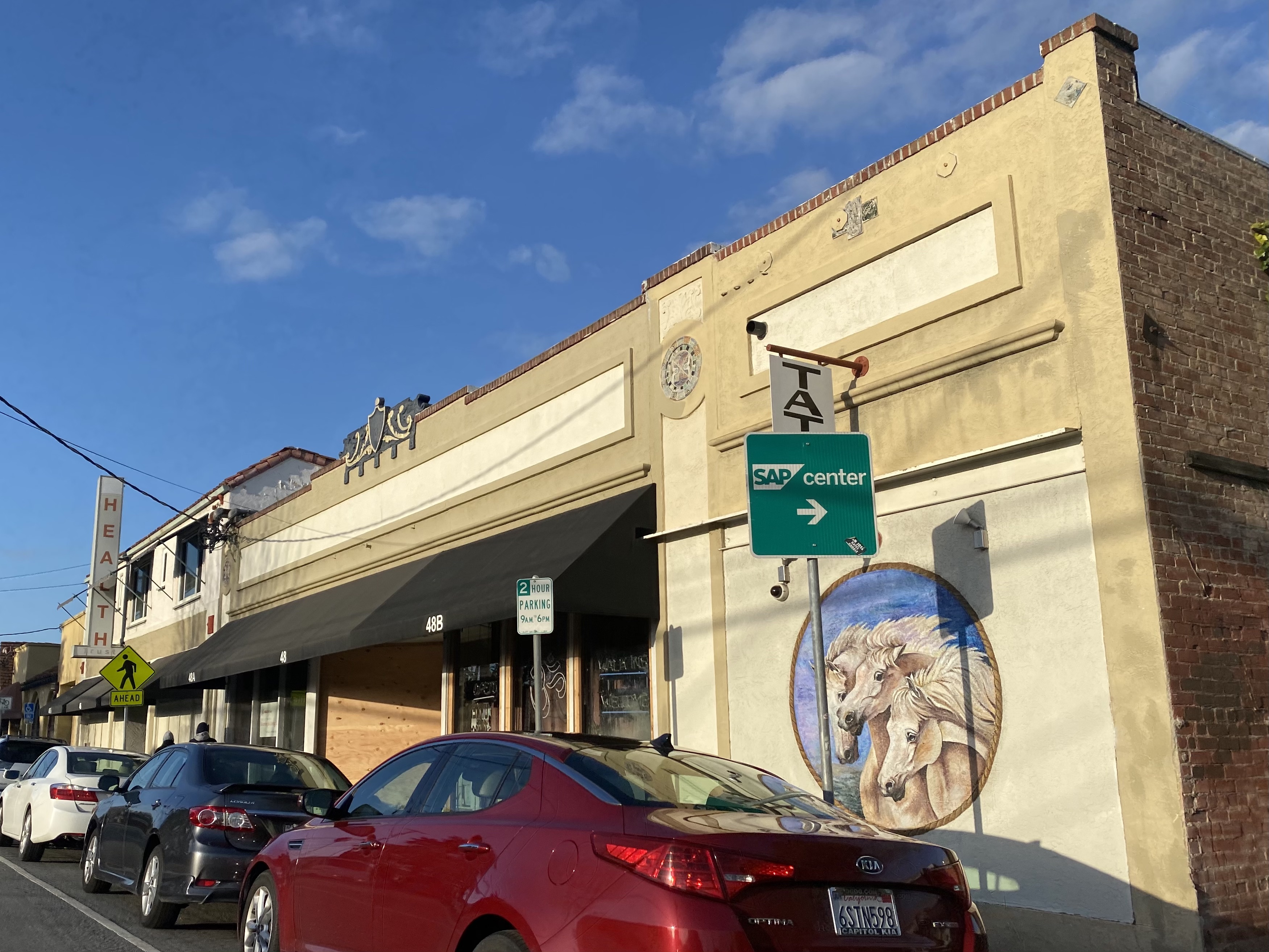

- Location within San Jose
- Coordinates: 37.329°N 121.910°W
- Country: United States
- State: California
- City: San Jose

St. Leo's is a small neighborhood of The Alameda district, in Central San Jose, California. It takes its name from the Saint Leo the Great Church, located in the center of the neighborhood.

== History ==
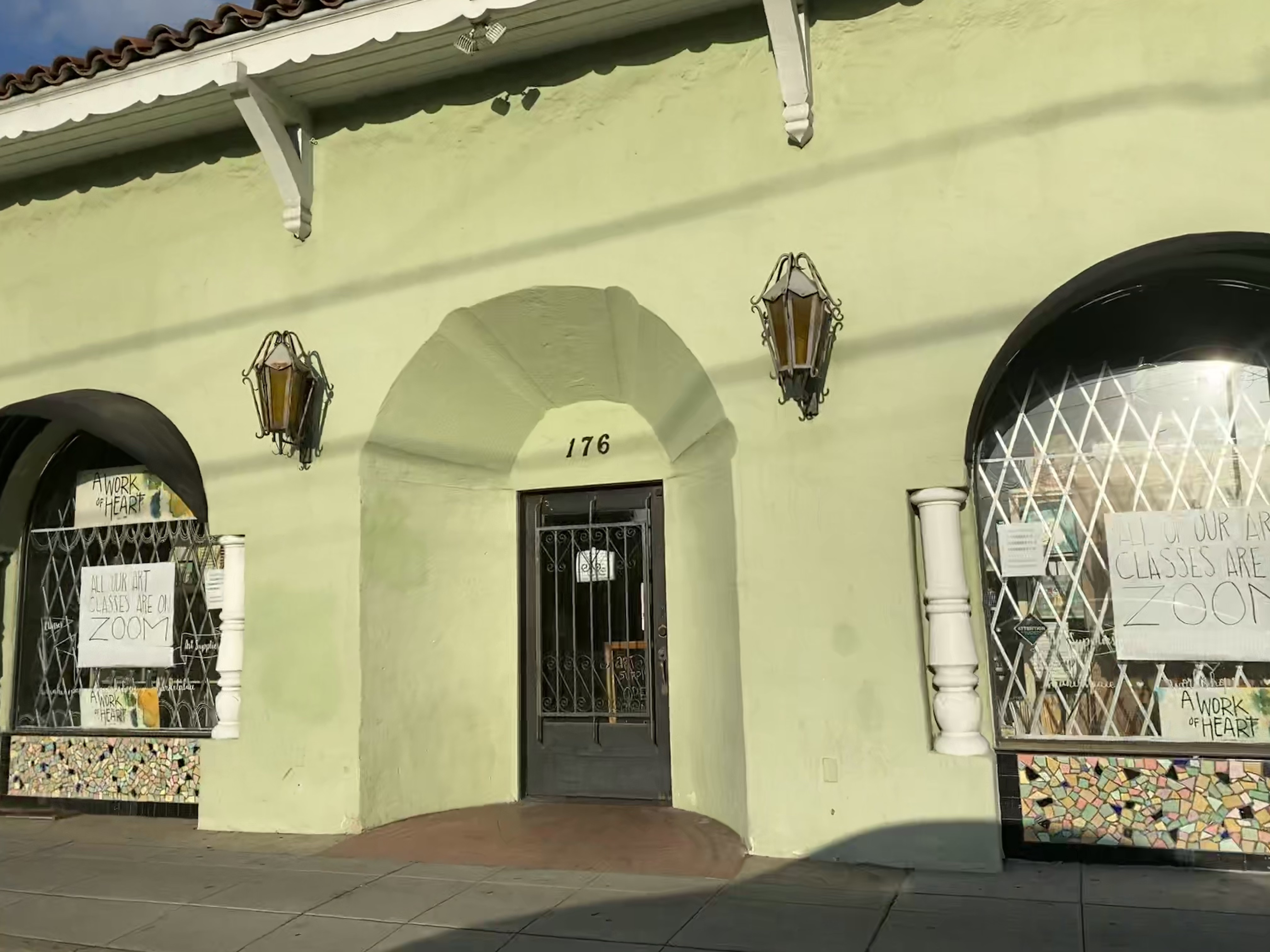
Spanish Colonial Revival architecture on Race St.

A collection of bungalow neighborhoods bordered by The Alameda, Park Avenue, Diridon Station, and Race Street. It neighbors the Shasta-Hanchett and Cahill Park neighborhoods. Most homes were built between 1900 and the 1920s. Many of the original residents worked in the old Del Monte cannery that have been converted to lofts.

== Culture ==
Known as San Jose's Gay neighborhood, St Leo's featured the Watergarden (a gay bath house, now closed due to the covid pandemic), The Billy DeFrank LGBT Community Center, Carla's Social Club for cross dressers and transgender events, Leather Masters adult store and Health Trust's AIDS Service program. The annual San Jose Gay Pride festival is held at nearby Discovery Meadow in Guadalupe River Park.

== Parks and plazas ==
- Cahill Park

== Popular culture ==
St Leo neighborhood and church are mentioned in Smash Mouth's song "Heave-Ho" where guitarist and songwriter Greg Camp rented a home (47 S. Morrison Ave., San Jose, CA 95126) and wrote about his neighbors and landlord.
