= San Leon =

San Leon may refer to:

- San Leon, Texas, a census designated place in Texas
- San Leon Energy, an Irish energy company
- San Leon del Amazonas
