= Shasta Hanchett Park, San Jose =

Shasta Hanchett Park
- Neighborhood of San Jose
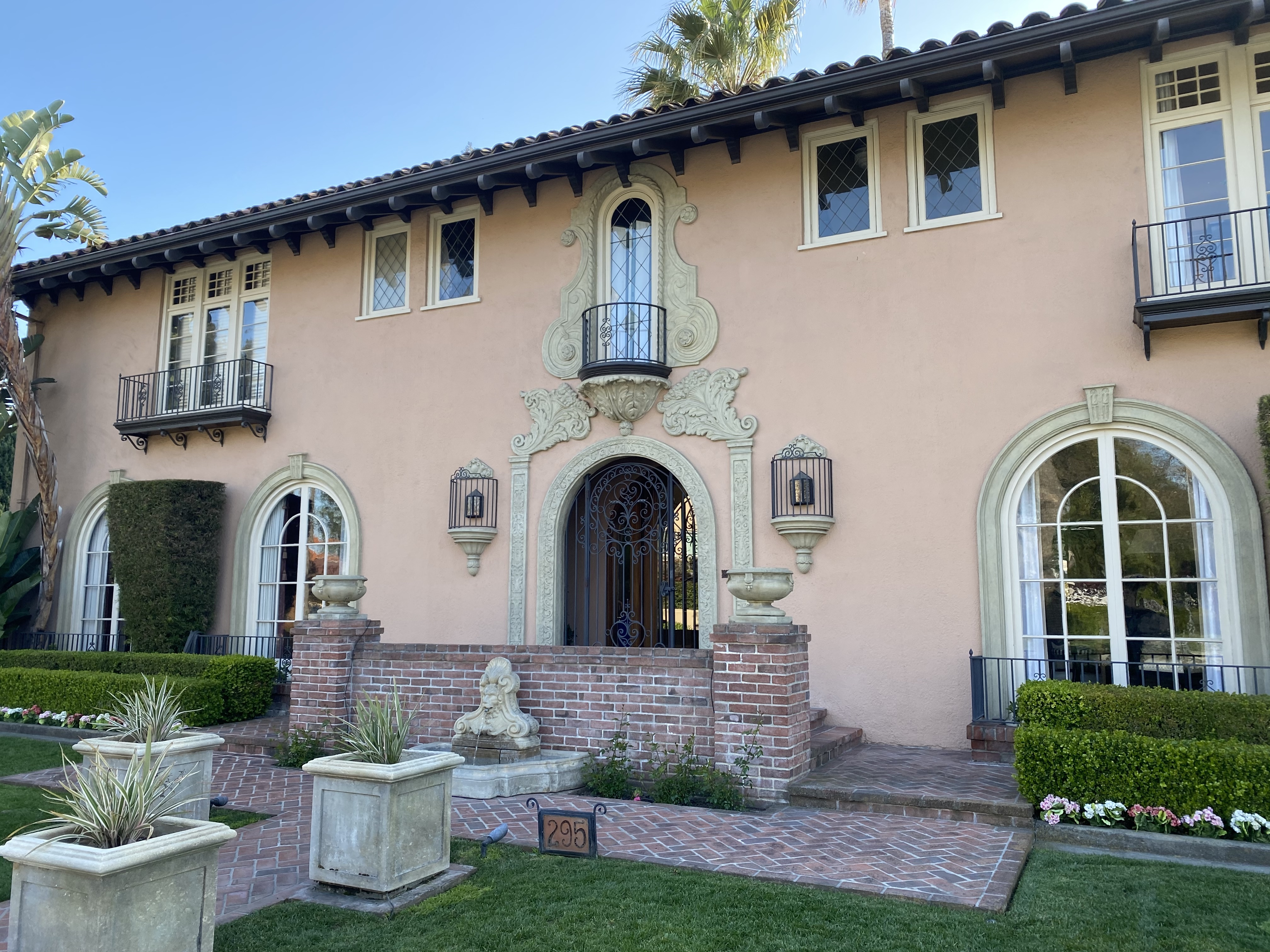
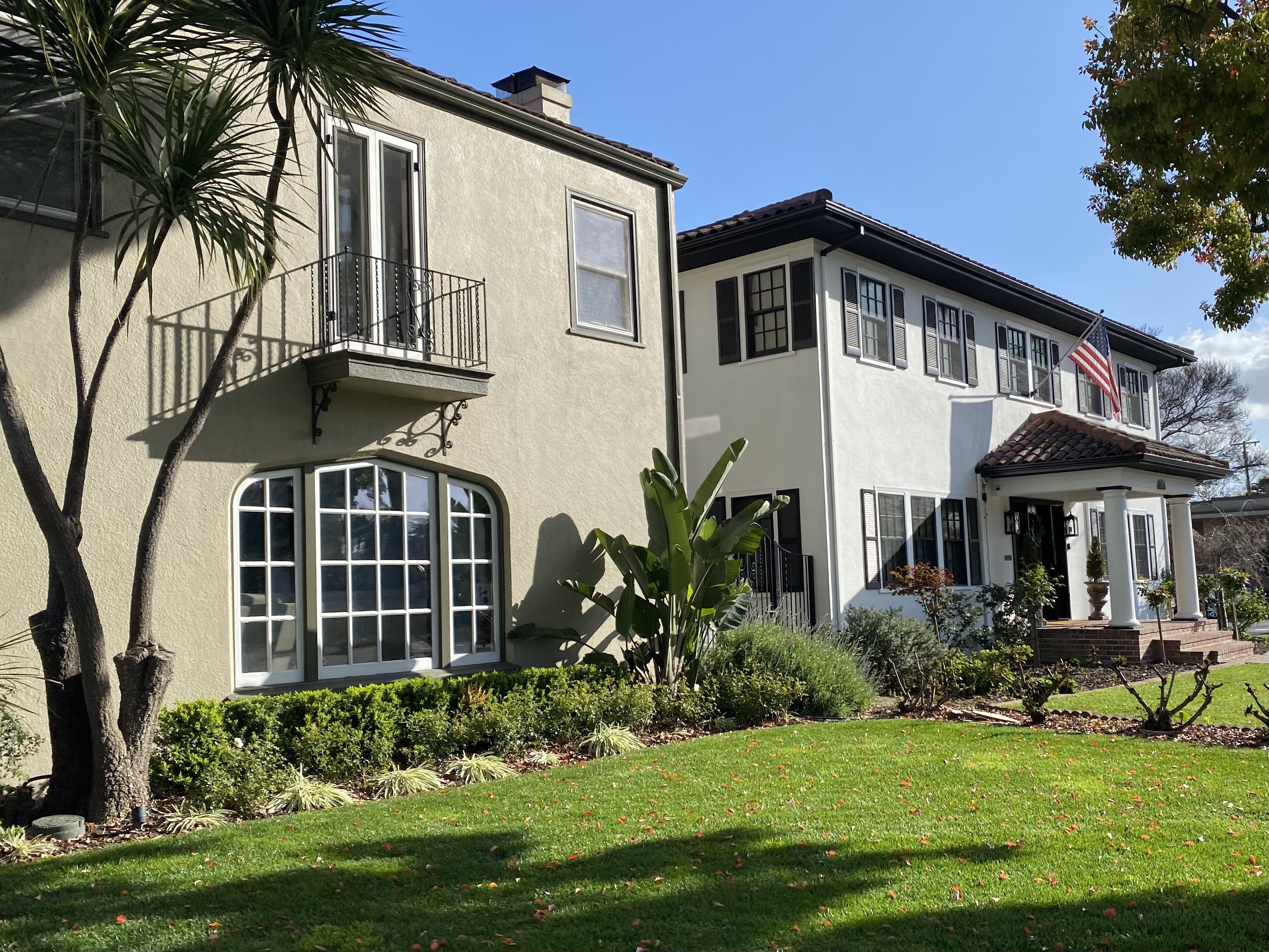
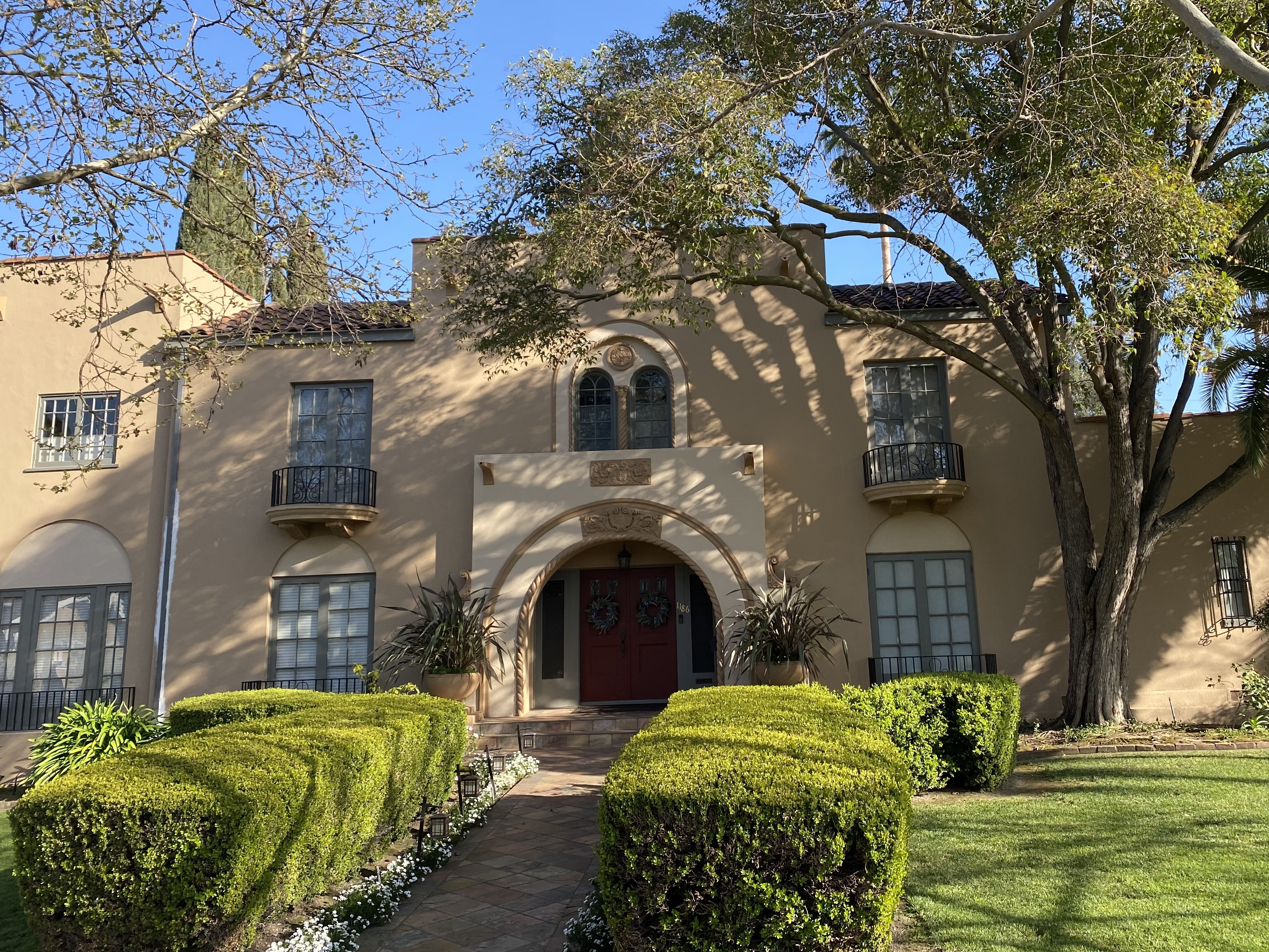
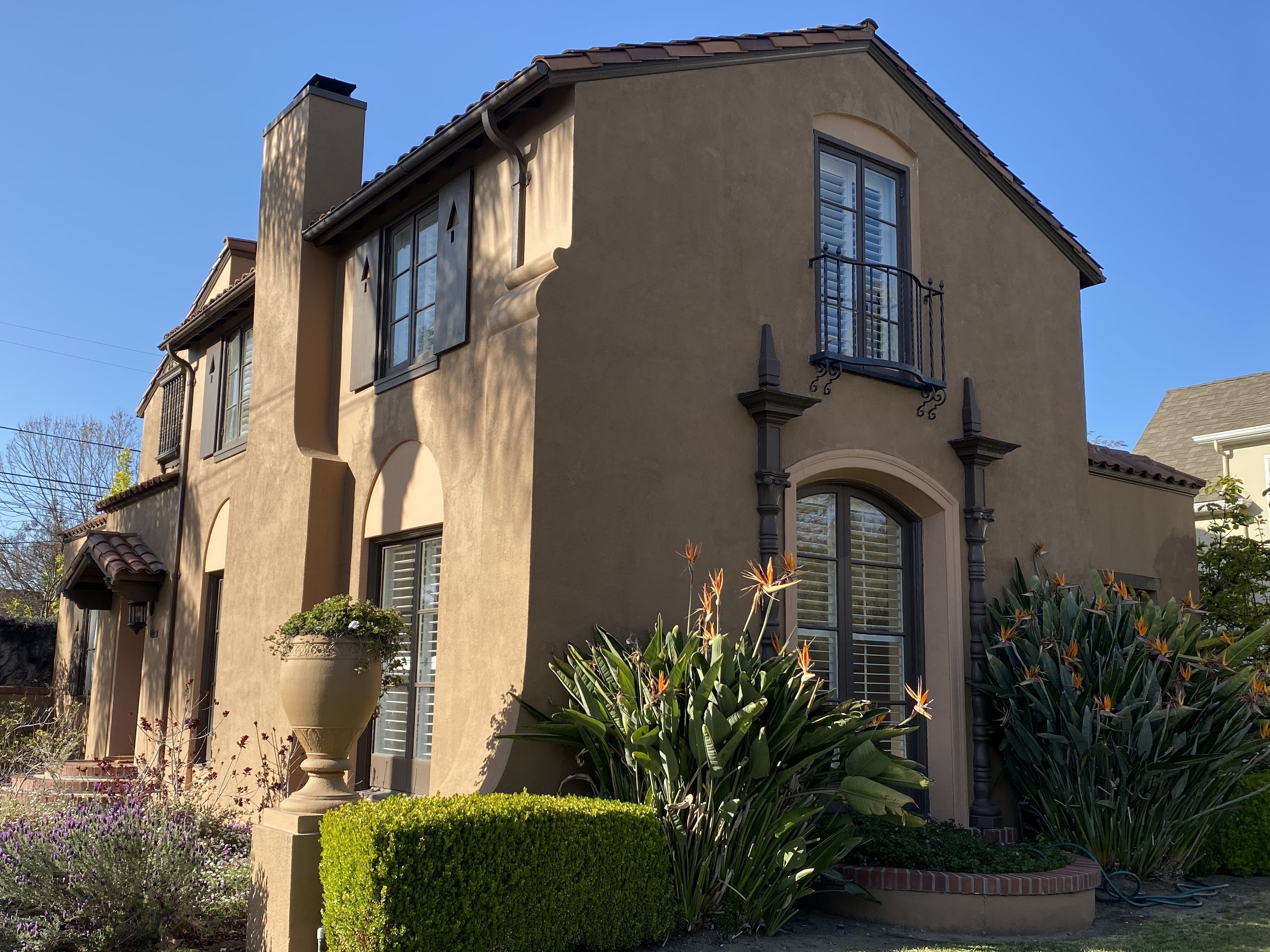
- Clockwise: San Jose Municipal Rose Garden; Rosicrucian Egyptian Museum; Lincoln High School; Rosicrucian Park Planetarium.

- Location within San Jose
- Coordinates: 37.32984°N 121.91912°W
- Country: United States
- State: California
- County: Santa Clara
- City: San Jose

Shasta Hanchett Park is a historic residence park and neighborhood in the greater Rose Garden district of central San Jose, California, near Downtown San Jose and The Alameda.

== History ==
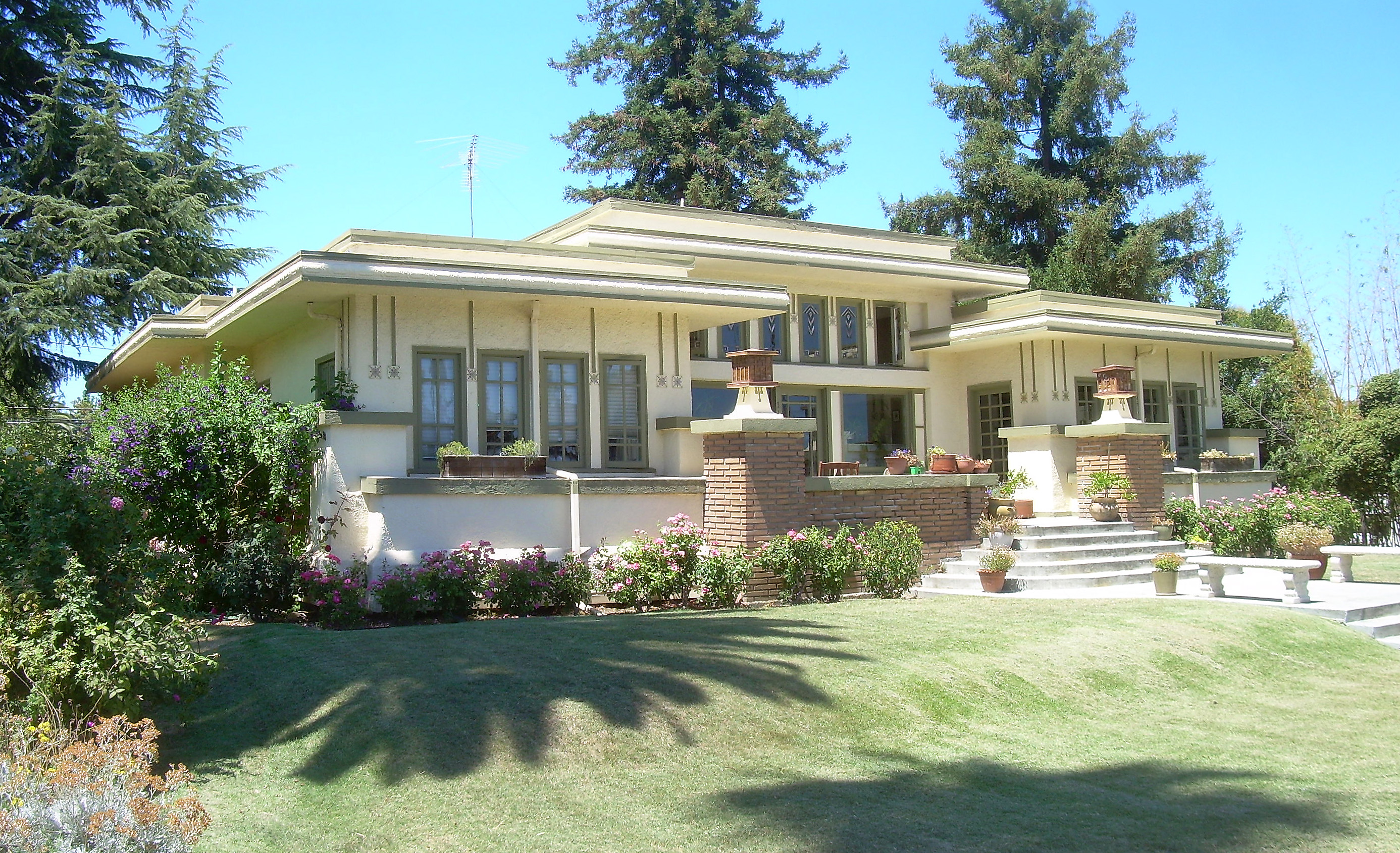
The historic Col House, designed in 1913 by Frank Delos Wolfe.

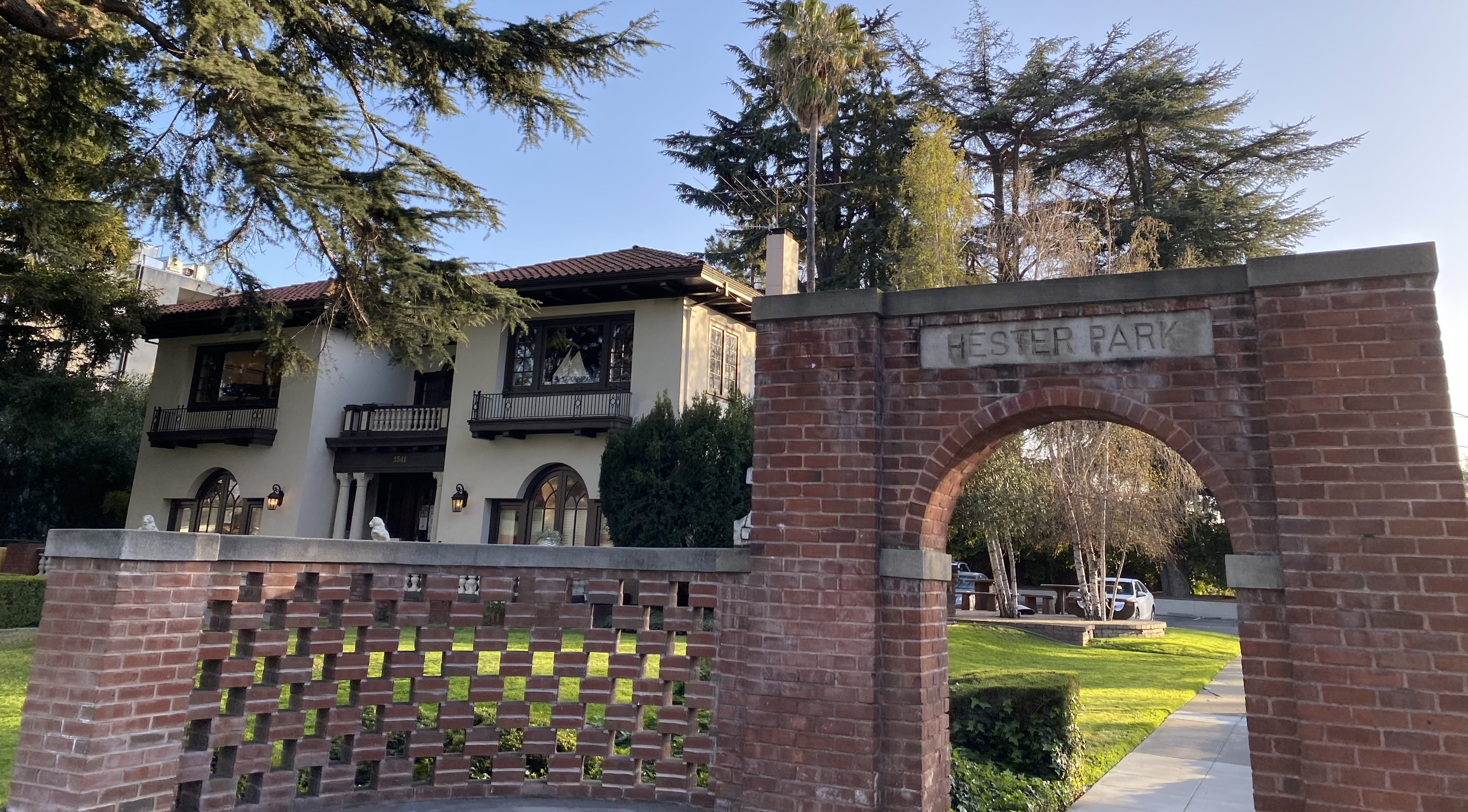
The historic Hester Park entry gate on The Alameda.

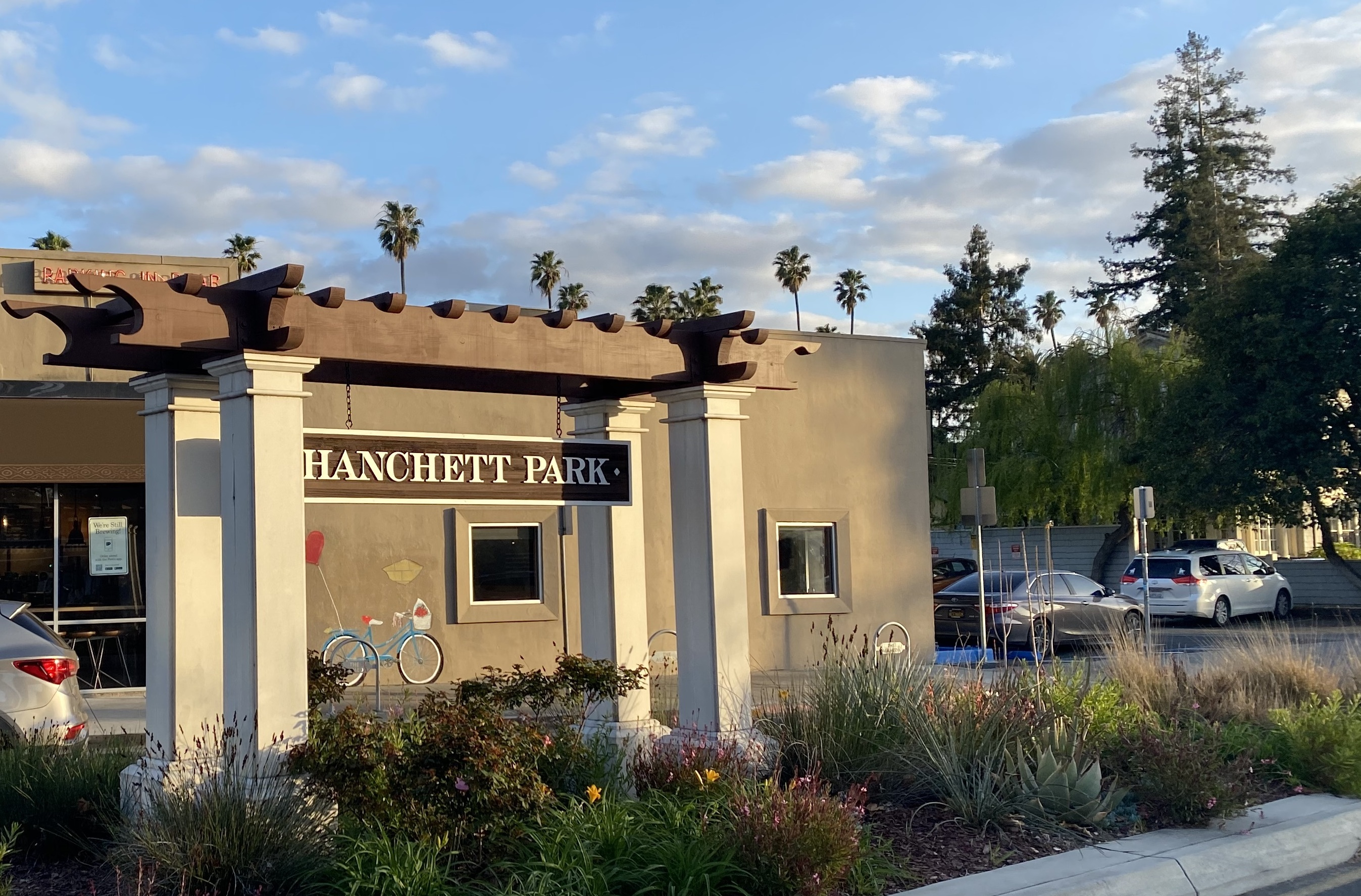
The historic Hanchett Park entry gate on The Alameda.

Hanchett Residence Park was developed beginning in 1907 by Lewis E. Hanchett on the site of the Agricultural Park amusement and exhibition grounds west of The Alameda. Hanchett provided electric streetlights, streetcar service, and a modern sewer system. The streets were laid out by John McLaren, supervisor and designer of Golden Gate Park in San Francisco, who located the utility poles in backyards to keep the sidewalks open and specified the trees to be planted 20 feet apart on each street. Most of the houses were built between 1915 and 1930 in Craftsman, Mission Revival, and Spanish eclectic styles; there are a few Prairie style houses and some Queen Anne style Victorian houses dating to before the development. Hanchett Park contains San Jose's greatest concentration of 1910–20 Craftsman houses.

Many of the neighborhood streets have Yosemite National Park-themed names: Sequoia Avenue, Mariposa Avenue, Yosemite Avenue, Sierra Avenue.

Together with the adjacent Hester Park, developed in 1893 and also laid out by McLaren, Hanchett Park has been designated a Historic Conservation Area by the City of San Jose: the Hanchett and Hester Park Conservation Area is bounded by The Alameda and Mariposa, Park, and Magnolia avenues. Some of Hester Park was annexed by the city in 1911; Hanchett Park and most of Hester Park were annexed at the same time as College Park in 1925.

Alameda Gardens was first developed in the mid-19th century by Commodore Robert F. Stockton, who ordered pre-fabricated two-story houses to be made in Philadelphia and Massachusetts and shipped to San Francisco; all were identical except for one larger house at the end of Spring Street. The subdivision attracted few buyers until the streetcar line made it more accessible.

== Geography ==
Shasta Hanchett Park is part of the greater Rose Garden district of Central San Jose, California, making up the eastern portion of Rose Garden. The Alameda forms its eastern boundary, where it also borders St. Leo's.

It is made up of the Hanchett Park and Hester Park residence parks.
