= Rose Garden, San Jose =

Rose Garden Rosegarden
- Neighborhood of San Jose
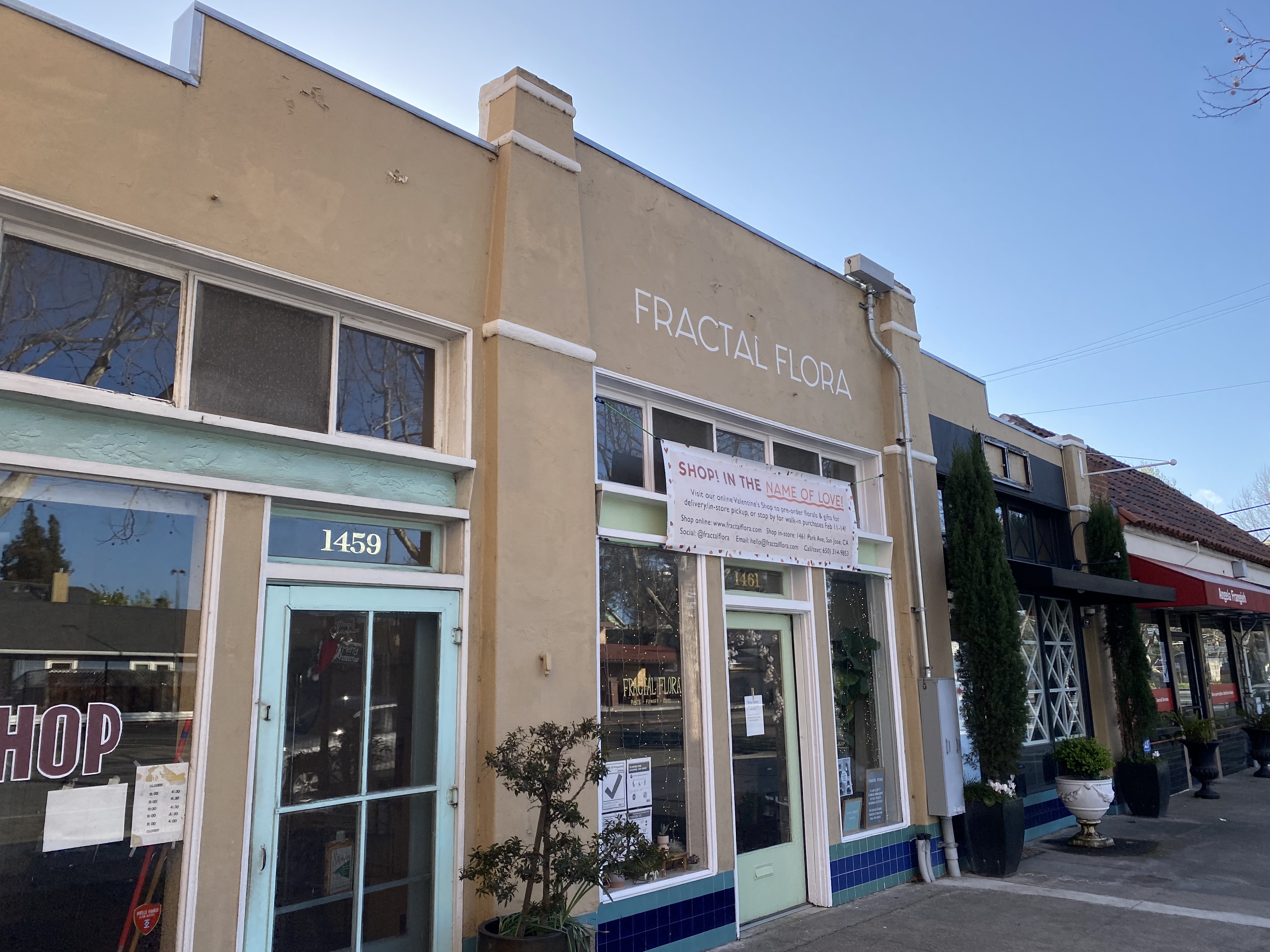
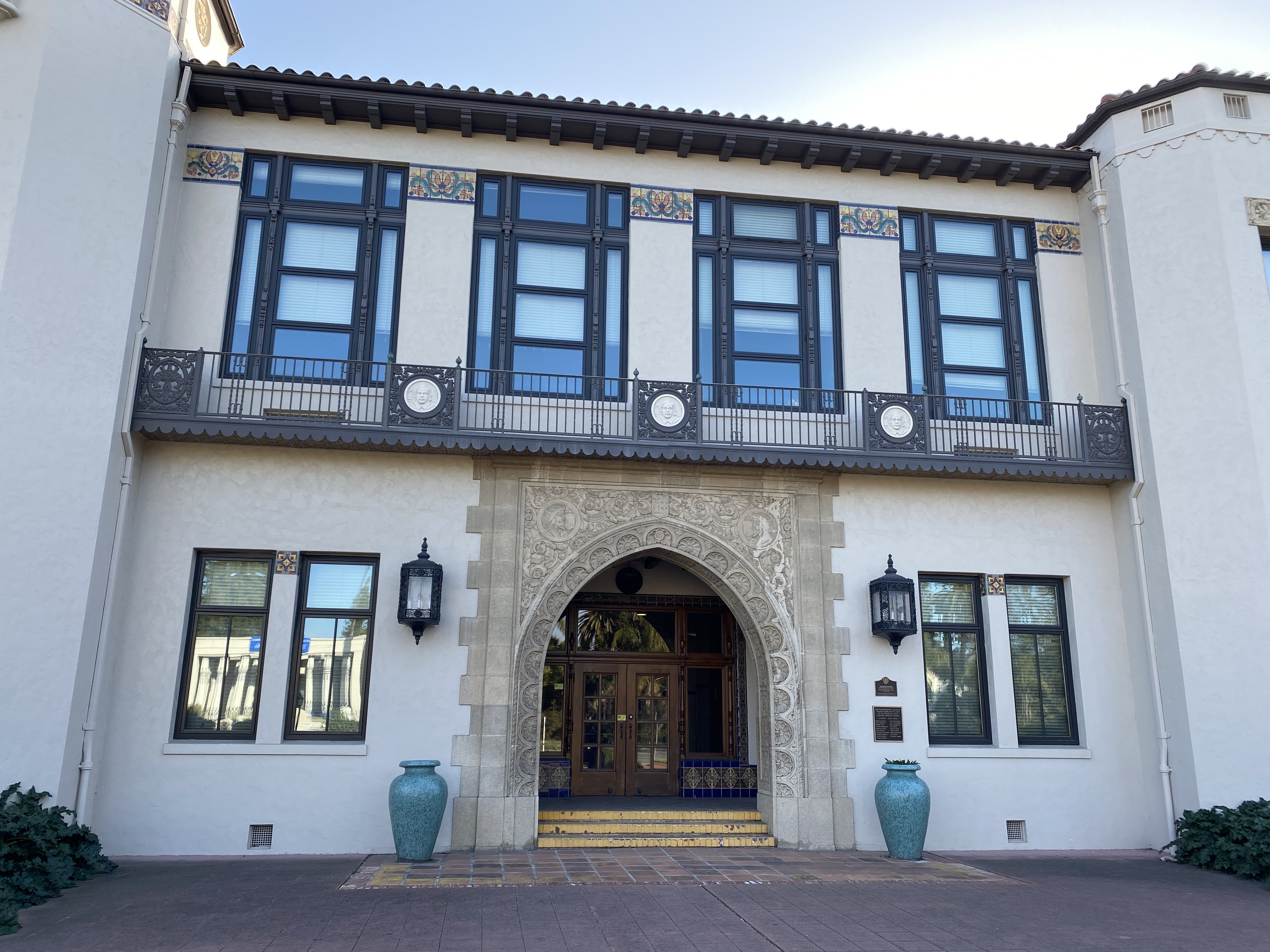
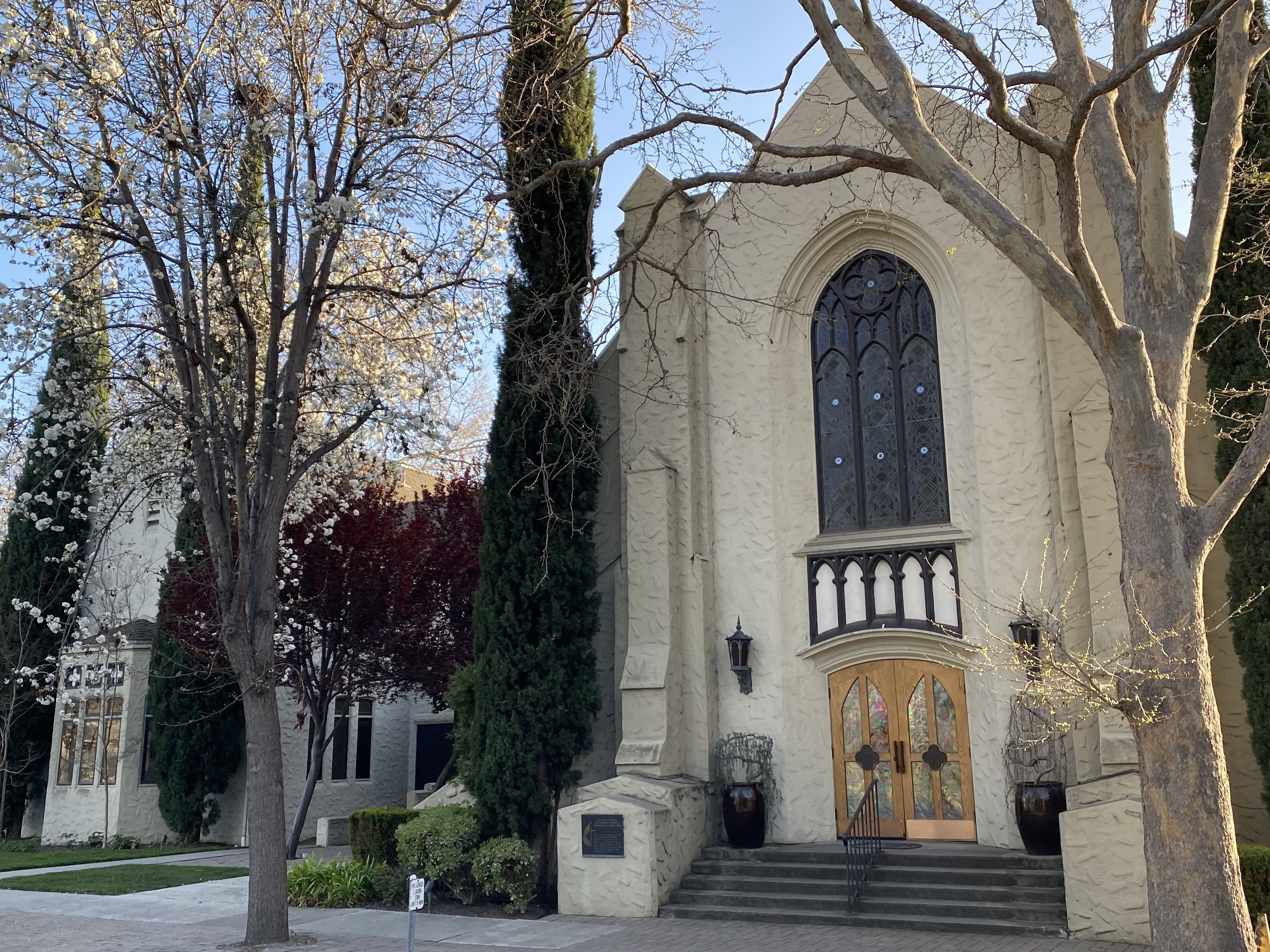
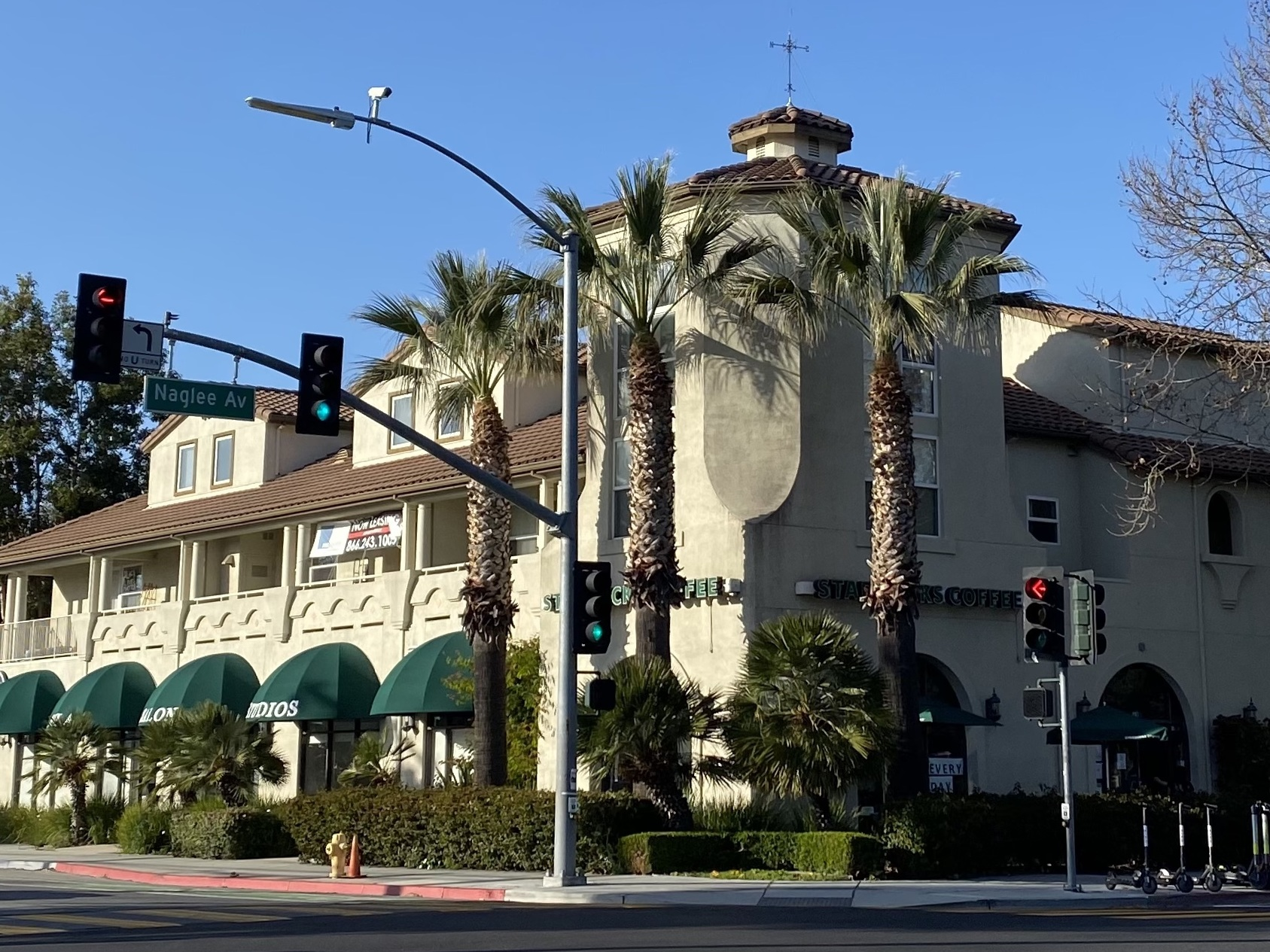
- Clockwise: Shops on Park Ave; historic Herbert Hoover Middle School; Shops on Naglee Ave; Calvary United Methodist Church.

- Location within San Jose
- Coordinates: 37.3319822°N 121.9281441°W
- Country: United States
- State: California
- County: Santa Clara
- City: San Jose
- Zip Codes: 95126

Rose Garden, also rendered as Rosegarden, is a historic district of Central San Jose, California, near Downtown San Jose and The Alameda. Rose Garden is a district made up of numerous historic neighborhoods, such as Hanchett Park, primarily characterized by its architecture and numerous cultural institutions, including the San Jose Municipal Rose Garden (for which the area is named), Rosicrucian Park, which includes the Rosicrucian Egyptian Museum, and the historic Hoover Theater.

== History ==
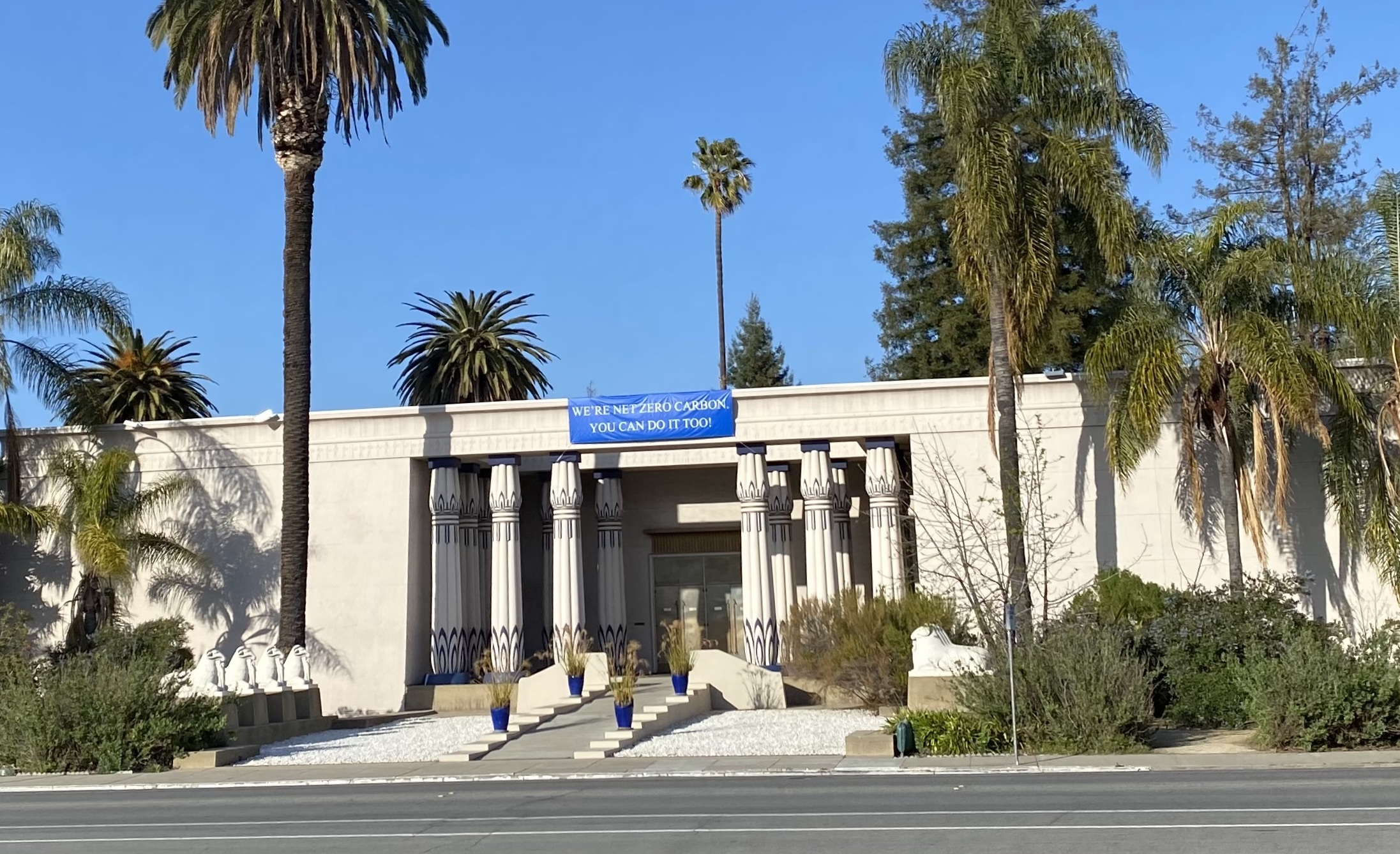
The Rosicrucian Egyptian Museum.

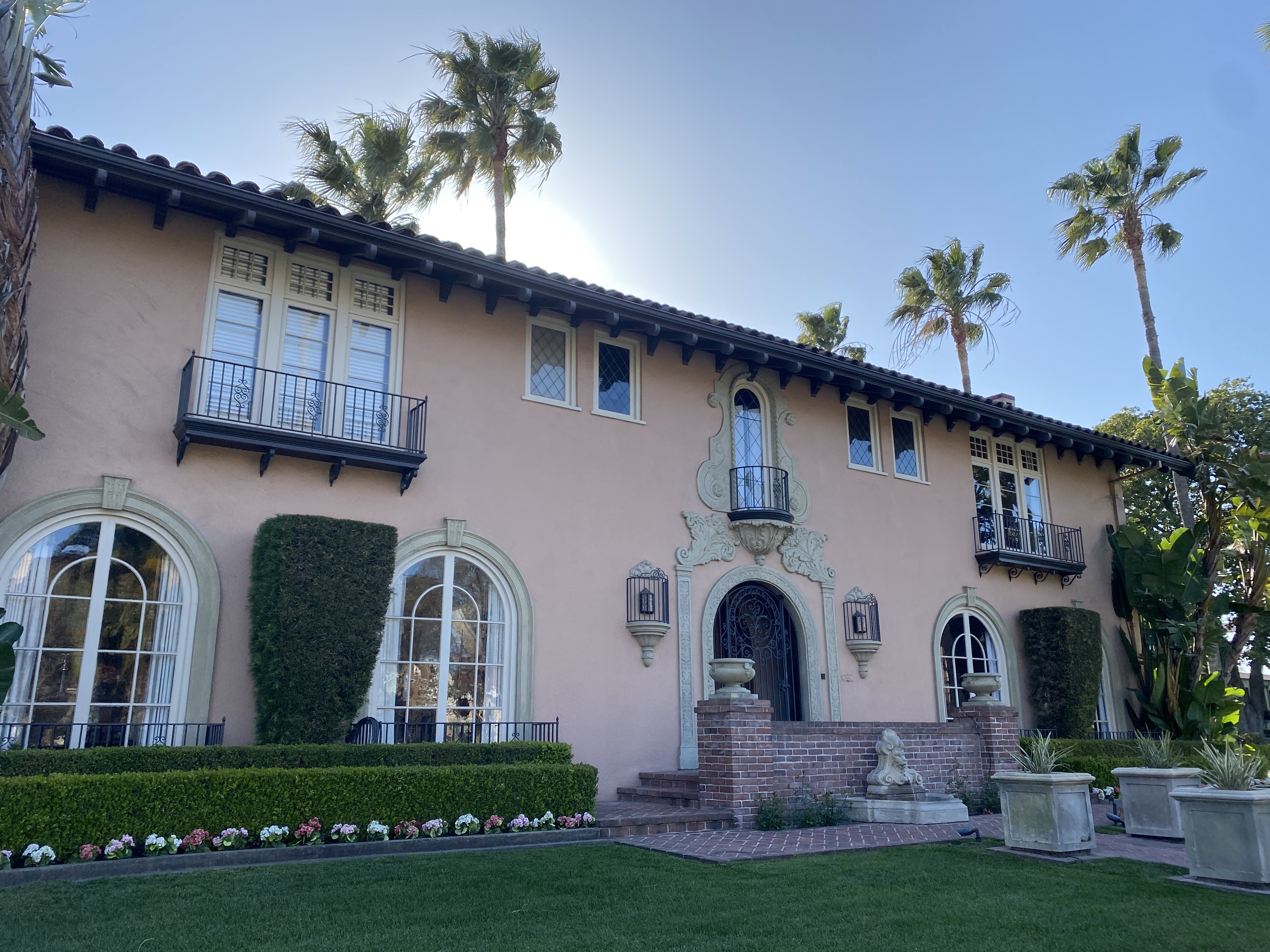
The historic Spanish Colonial Martin Residence, in the Shasta Hanchett Park area of Rose Garden.

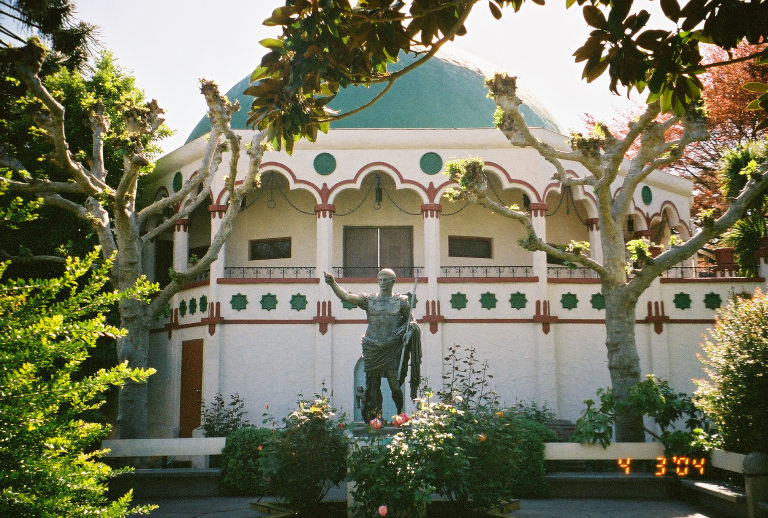
Rosicrucian Park Planetarium.

The neighborhood surrounds and is named for the San Jose Municipal Rose Garden, a 5 1/2-acre (22,000 m^{2}) park with thousands of rose bushes.

The Rose Garden is of one of San Jose's oldest neighborhoods outside of the 18th and 19th century downtown core around the Pueblo de San José de Guadalupe. Several existing Victorian houses in the neighborhood date from the 1860s and 1870s, especially along Magnolia Street, Hester Street, and Hedding Street.

One of the oldest subdivisions of San Jose is the 1877 Chapman & Davis tract, which spans roughly 3x8 city blocks lying to the west of the San Jose and Santa Clara Railroad along The Alameda. This was the first interurban railroad in California when it opened with horsecars in 1868, the second electric streetcar line in California (after one in San Diego), and the first interurban electric streetcar in the West when it reopened in 1888 with an underground third rail. It was converted to an overhead trolley in 1889. Each residential lot was originally one-half acre, but most have been subdivided further since.

In the late 19th and early 20th centuries, The Alameda attracted many wealthy residents who built mansions along it. The Dunne mansion on the corner of Emory Street, built in the 1890s, may be the oldest building on the street.

In 1927, what is now the San Jose Municipal Rose Garden and its immediate surroundings were primarily pear and prune orchards, many owned by Food Machinery Corporation (FMC). The area was also home to farm houses and a few mansions. In that year, the City purchased an 11-acre (45,000 m^{2}) prune garden and converted part of it into the Municipal Rose Garden.

In 1937, John Crummey, the chairman of FMC, subdivided his 25-acre (100,000 m^{2}) pear orchard into residential lots sold for $5,00 each. This initial development established the core of the neighborhood called Rose Park.

The neighborhood has preserved its residential housing. The original architecture of the 1920s and 1930s borrowed bits from the English Cotswold Cottage, Norman and Tudor design. Many of the original bungalows have been extensively remodeled or torn down and replaced with newer architectural styles.

== Education ==
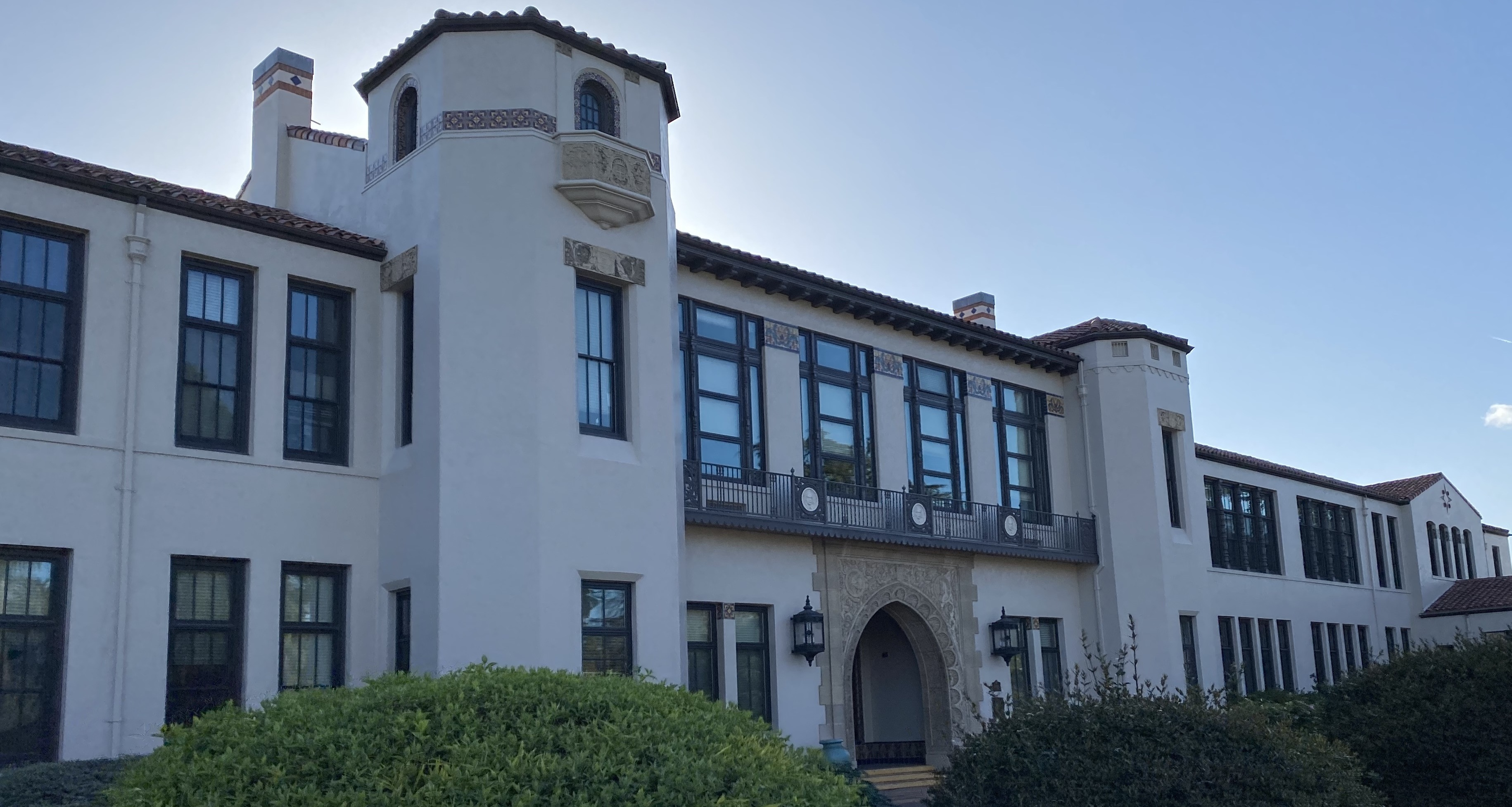
Herbert Hoover Middle School.

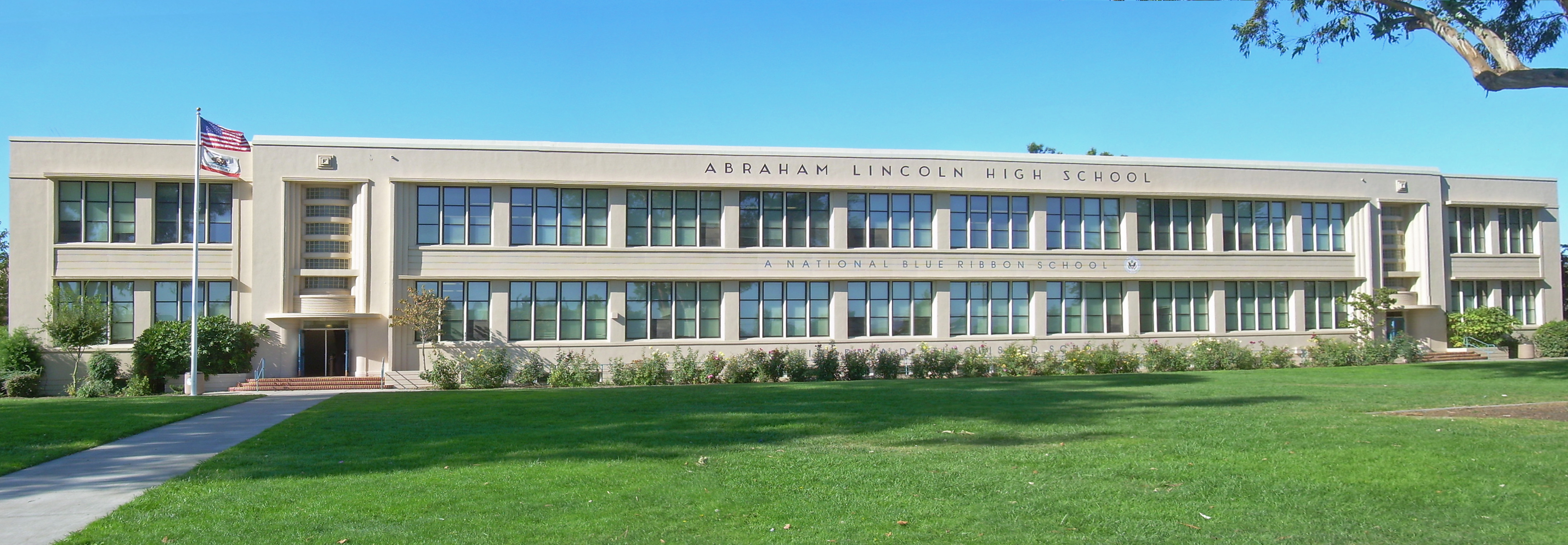
Lincoln High School, a National Blue Ribbon school.

Rose Garden is served by the San José Unified School District.

Santa Clara University is within walking distance of the neighborhood.

SJUSD High schools:

- Lincoln High School – A National Blue Ribbon – Public
- Downtown College Prep – Charter High School

SJUSD Middle schools:

- Hoover Middle School – Public 6-8th

SJUDS Elementary schools:

- Trace Elementary – Public Elementary PK-5th
- Burbank Elementary – Public Elementary

Private schools:

- St Martin of Tours – Catholic K-8
- Bellarmine College Preparatory is located nearby in College Park

== Geography ==
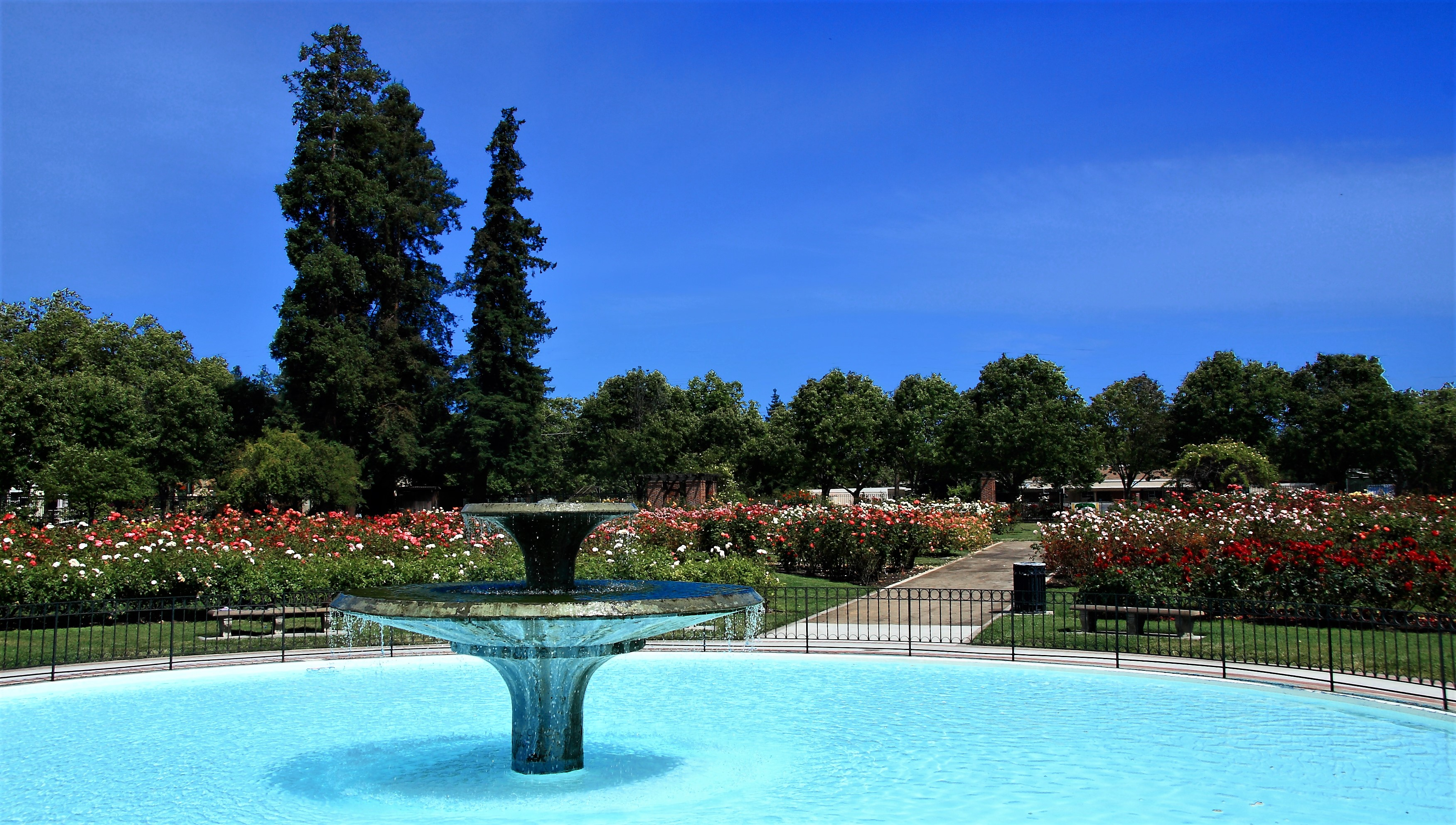
The San Jose Municipal Rose Garden during springtime.

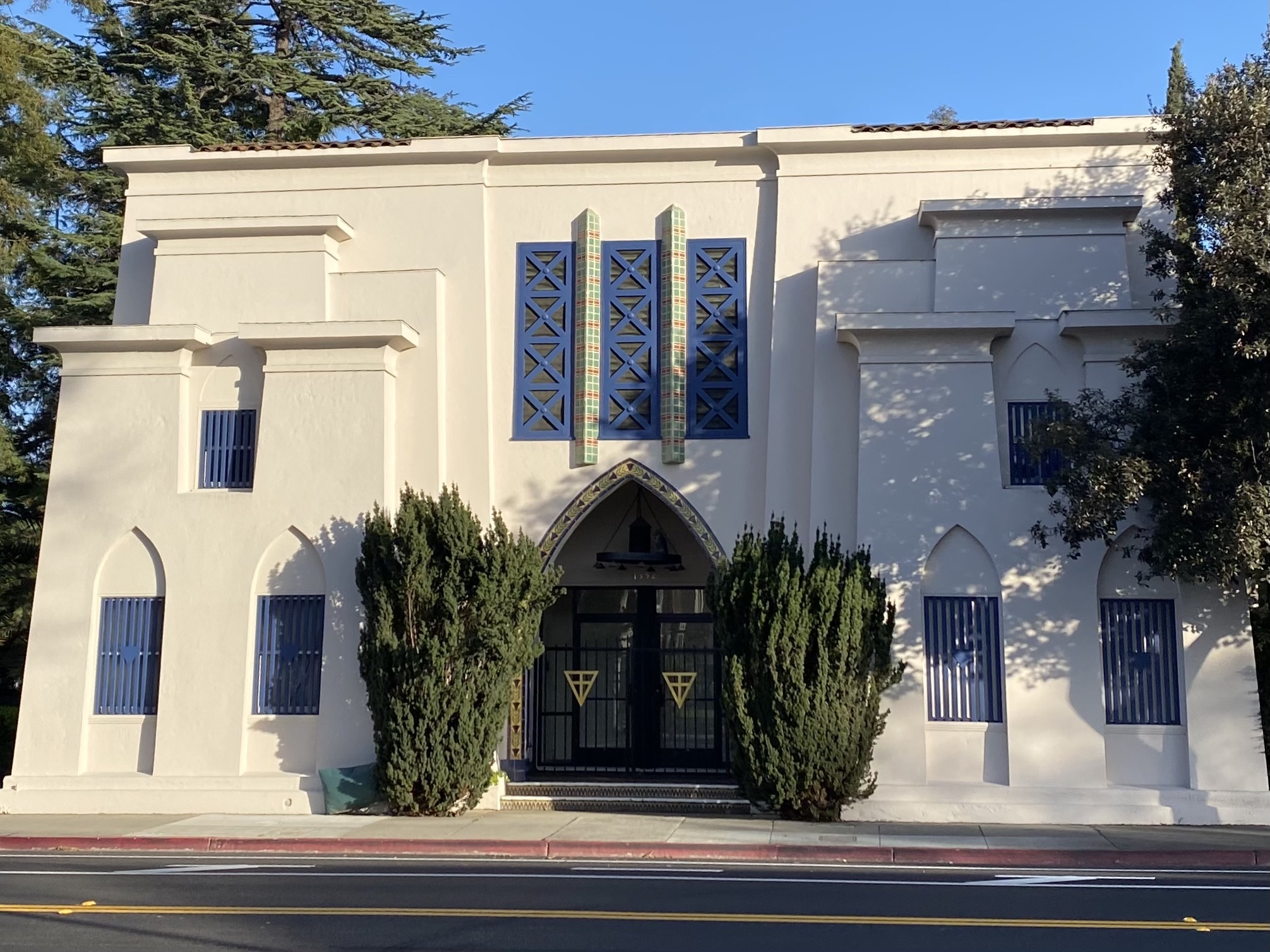
Francis Bacon Auditorium.

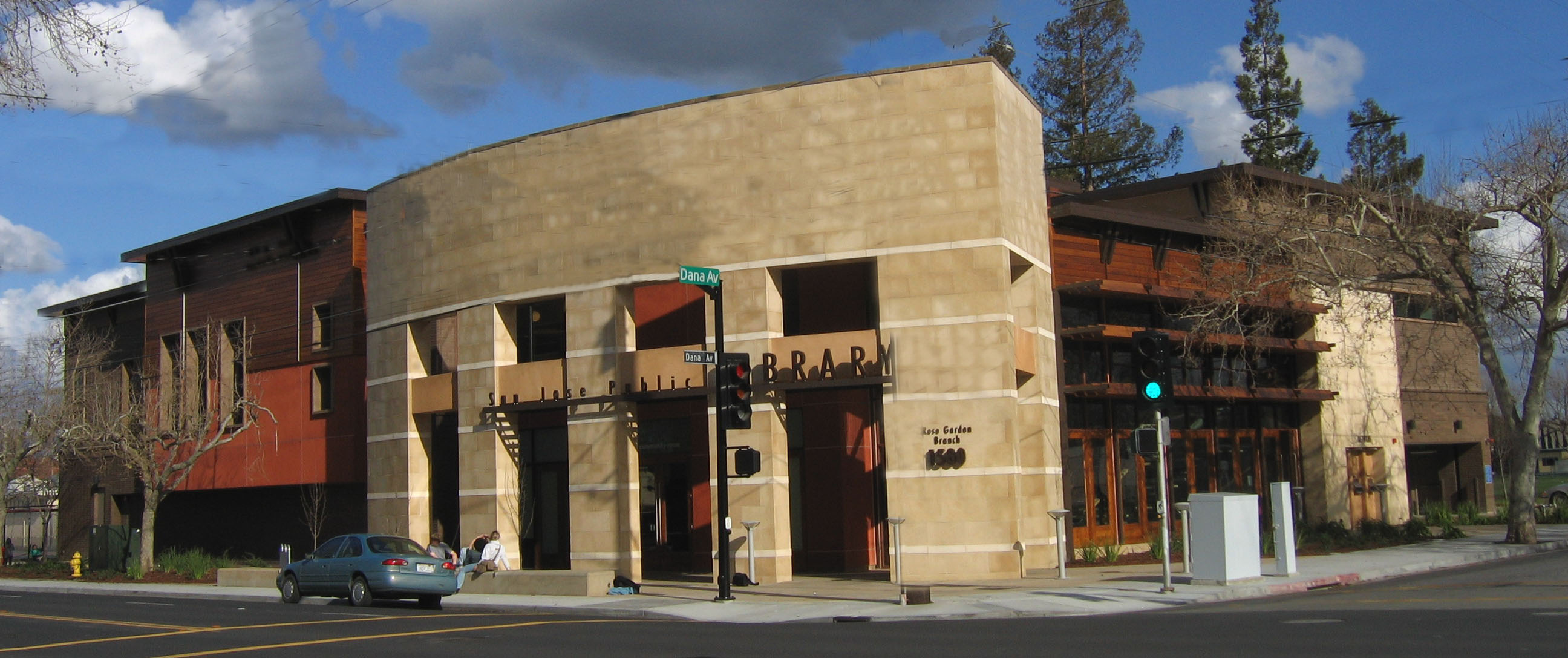
The Rose Garden Branch of the San José Public Library.

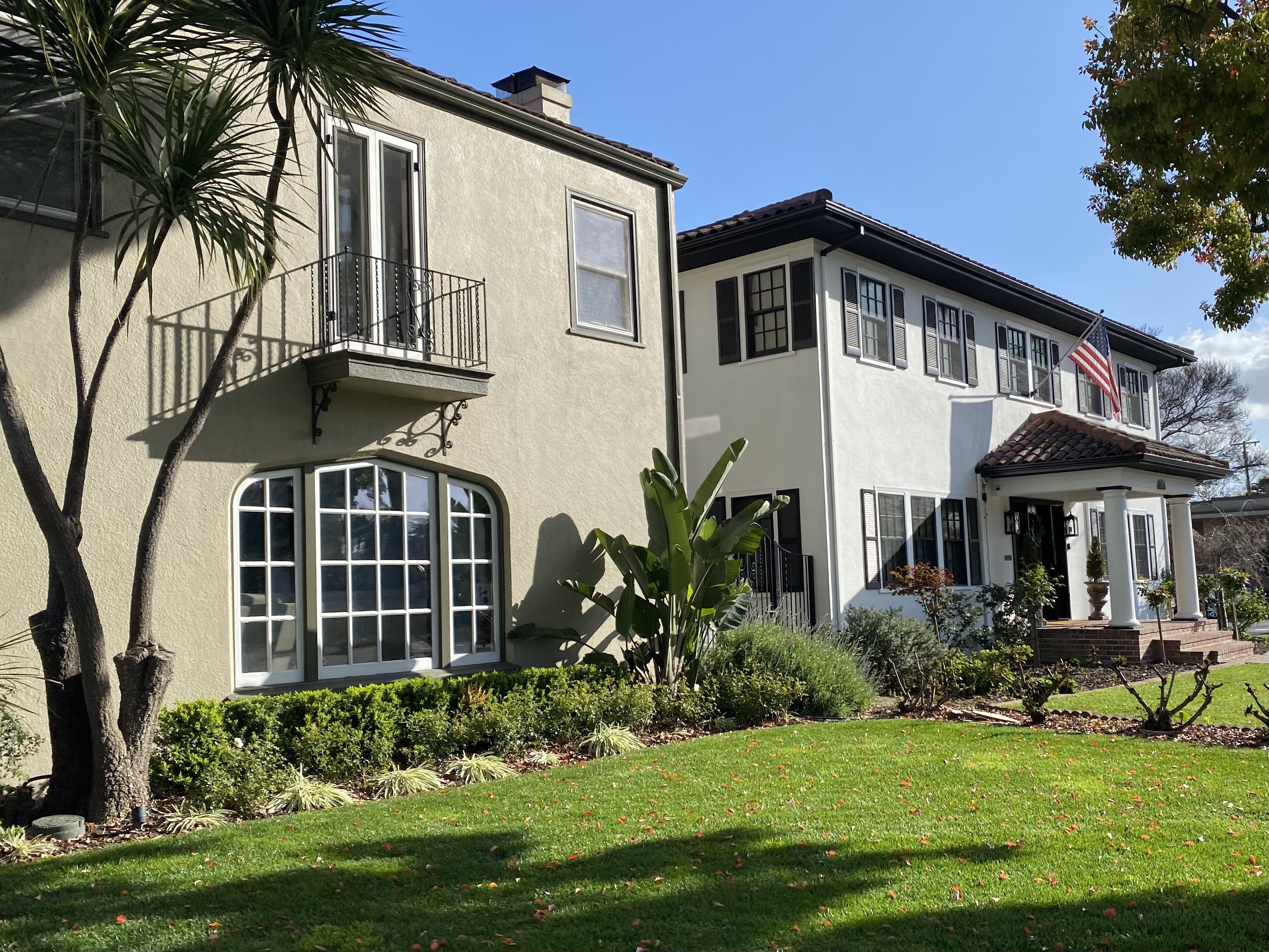
Historic residences in the Shasta Hanchett Park area of Rose Garden.

Rose Garden is a district of Central San Jose, California, made up of several neighborhoods located near Downtown San Jose. Its northeastern boundary is formed by The Alameda. South of Rose Garden is West San Carlos and Midtown San Jose. Its western boundary is formed by the Nimitz Freeway (CA-880).

The Shasta Hanchett Park area makes up the eastern half of Rose Garden, bordering St. Leo's (a neighborhood of The Alameda).

=== Landmarks ===
Rose Garden is home to numerous prominent cultural institutions, including:

- San Jose Municipal Rose Garden
- Rosicrucian Park
- Rosicrucian Egyptian Museum
- Rosicrucian Park Planetarium
- Francis Bacon Auditorium
- Historic Hoover Theater
- Calvary United Methodist Church
- St. Nicholas Orthodox Church

=== Notable streets ===
- Morse Street – Named after Santa Clara resident Charles Copeland Morse who founded the Ferry-Morse Seed Company in 1884.
- University Avenue – Named for the street that was the main entrance to the University of the Pacific (before it moved to Stockton, California, and later purchased for Bellarmine College Preparatory. San Jose State maintains their president's home towards the western end of this street.
- Naglee Avenue – Named after General Henry Morris Naglee
- Bascom Avenue – Named after Lewis Hazelton Bascom
- Emory Street – Named after Methodist minister John Emory
- Hedding Street – Named after Methodist minister Elijah Hedding

== Gallery ==
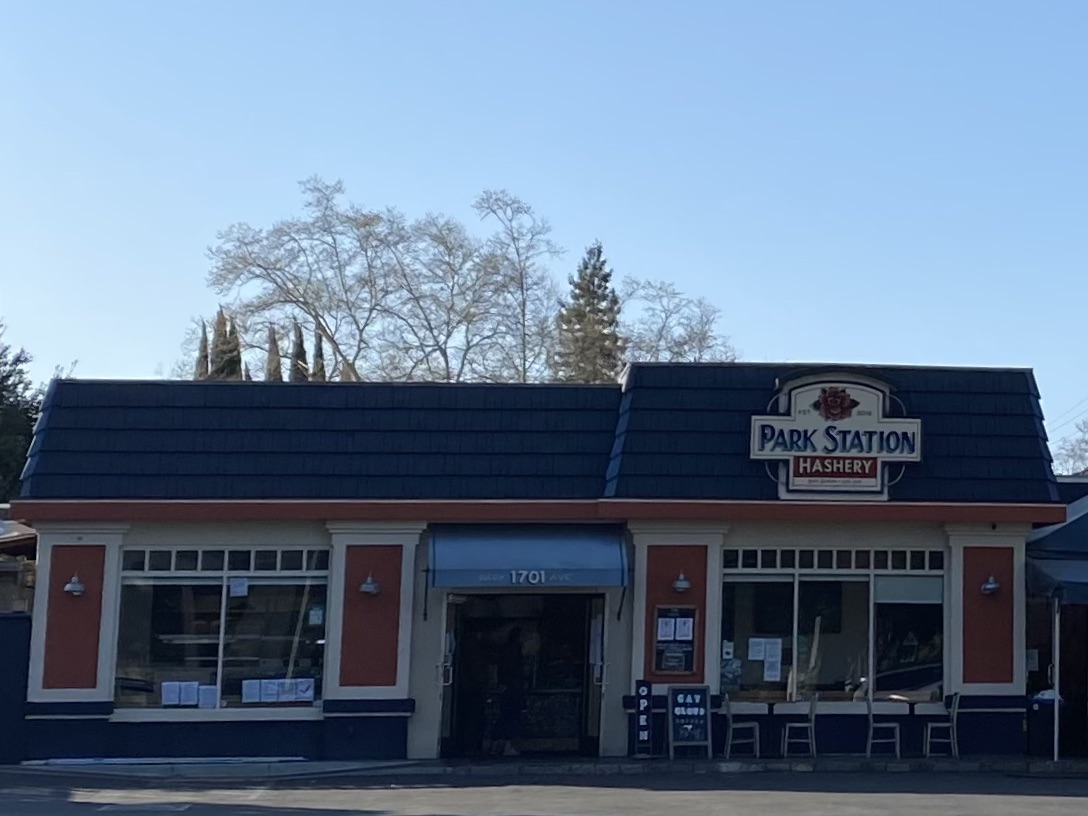
Restaurant in Rose Garden

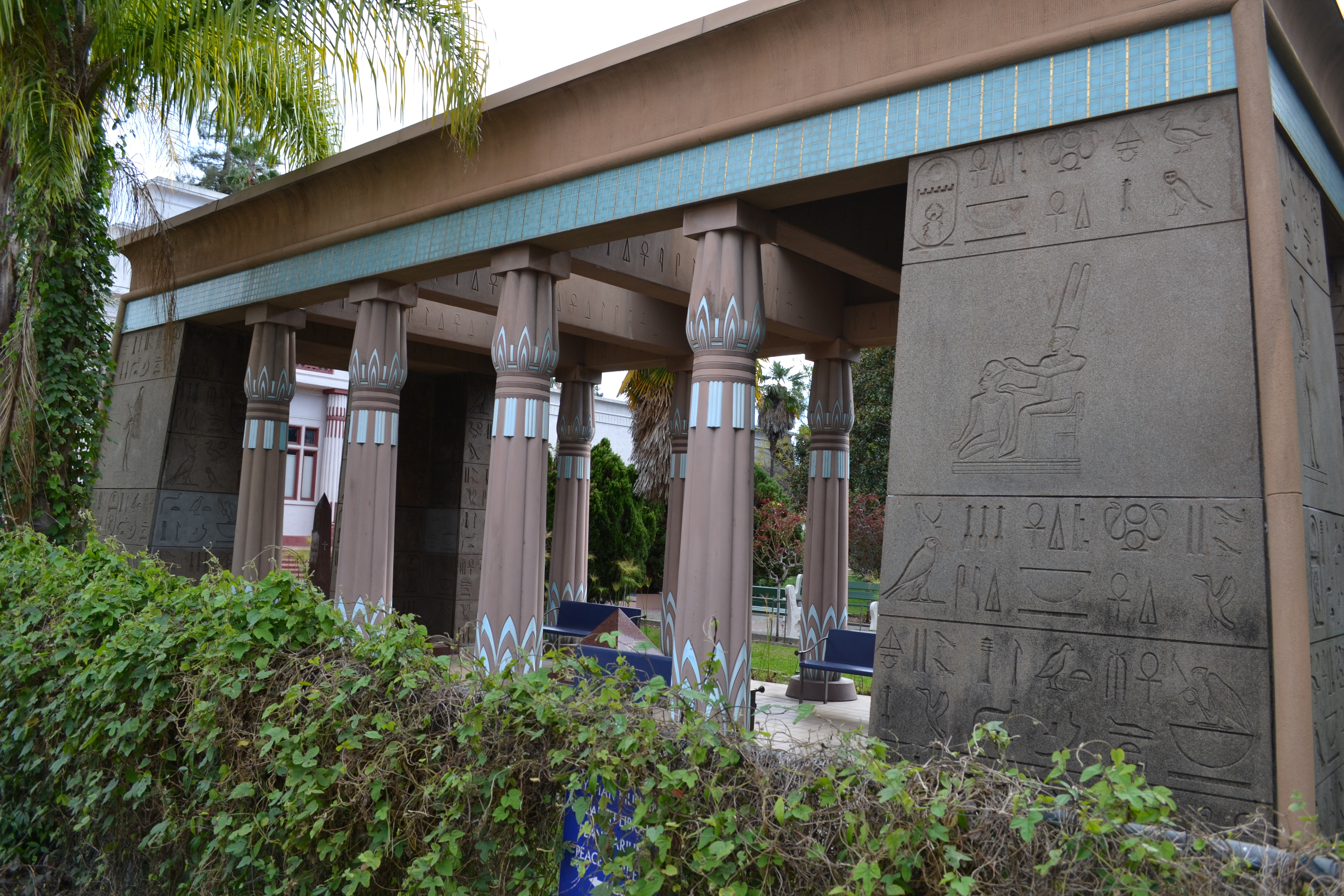
Rosicrucian Park

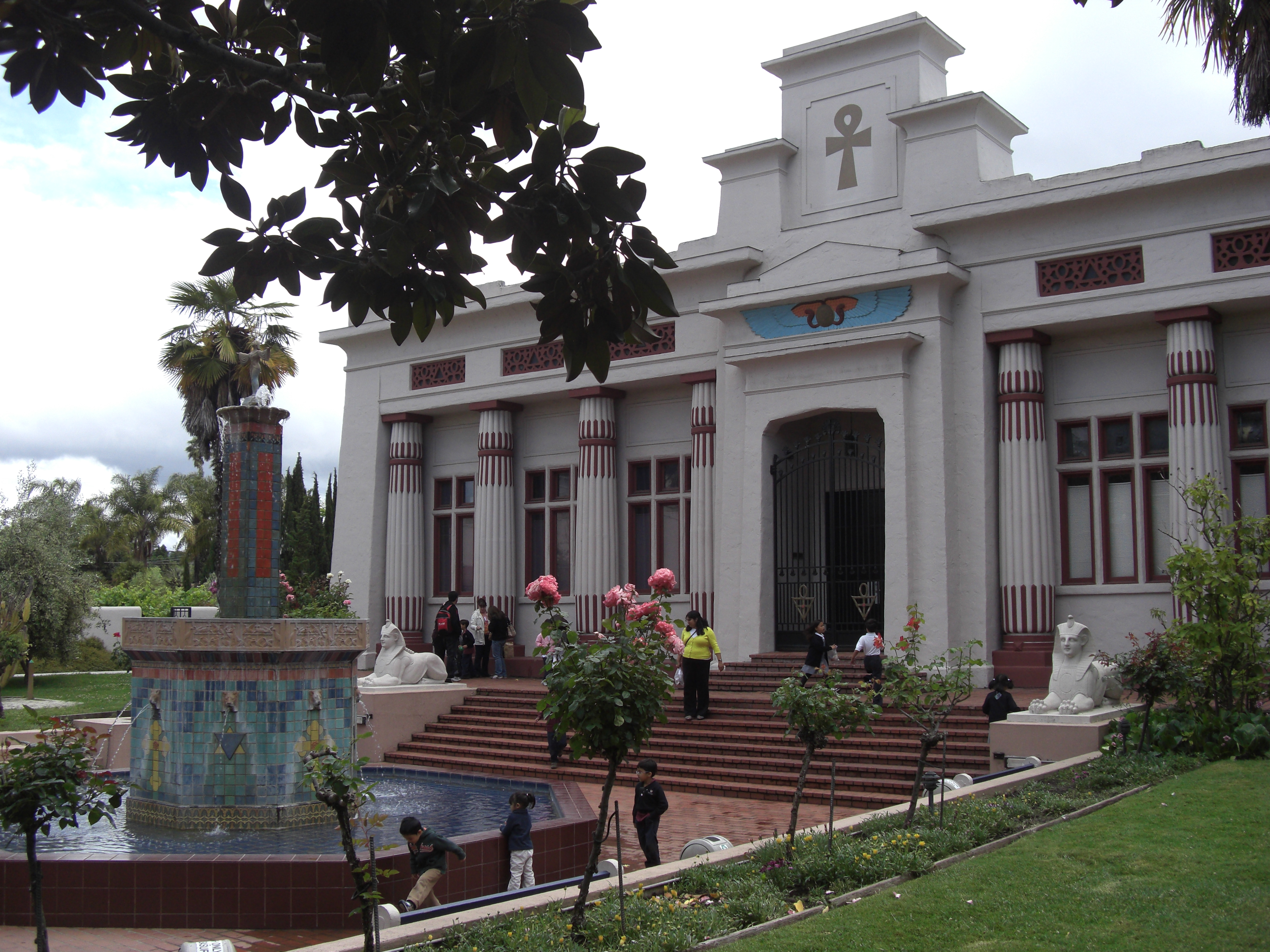
Rosicrucian Egyptian Museum

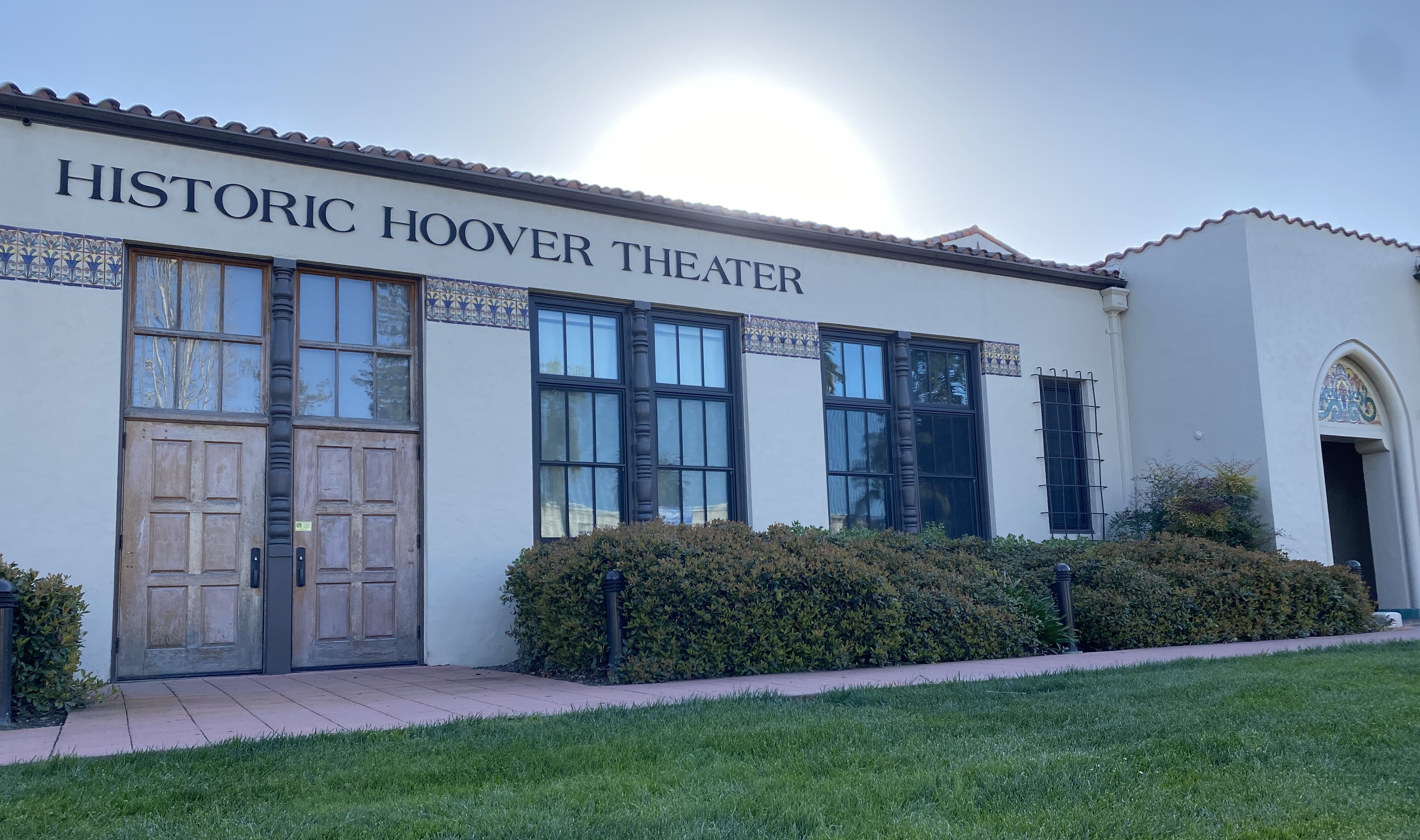
Historic Hoover Theater

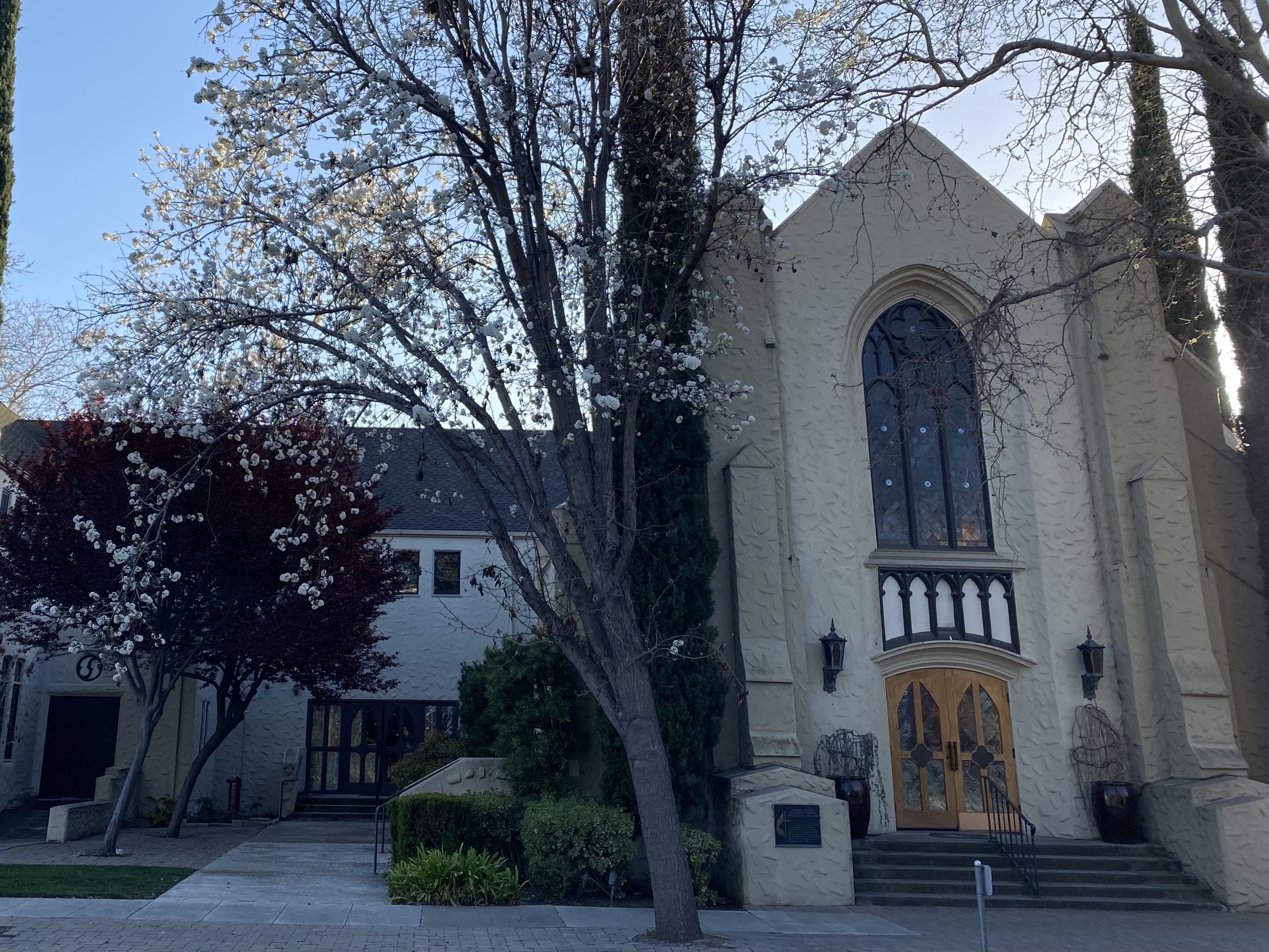
Calvary United Methodist Church

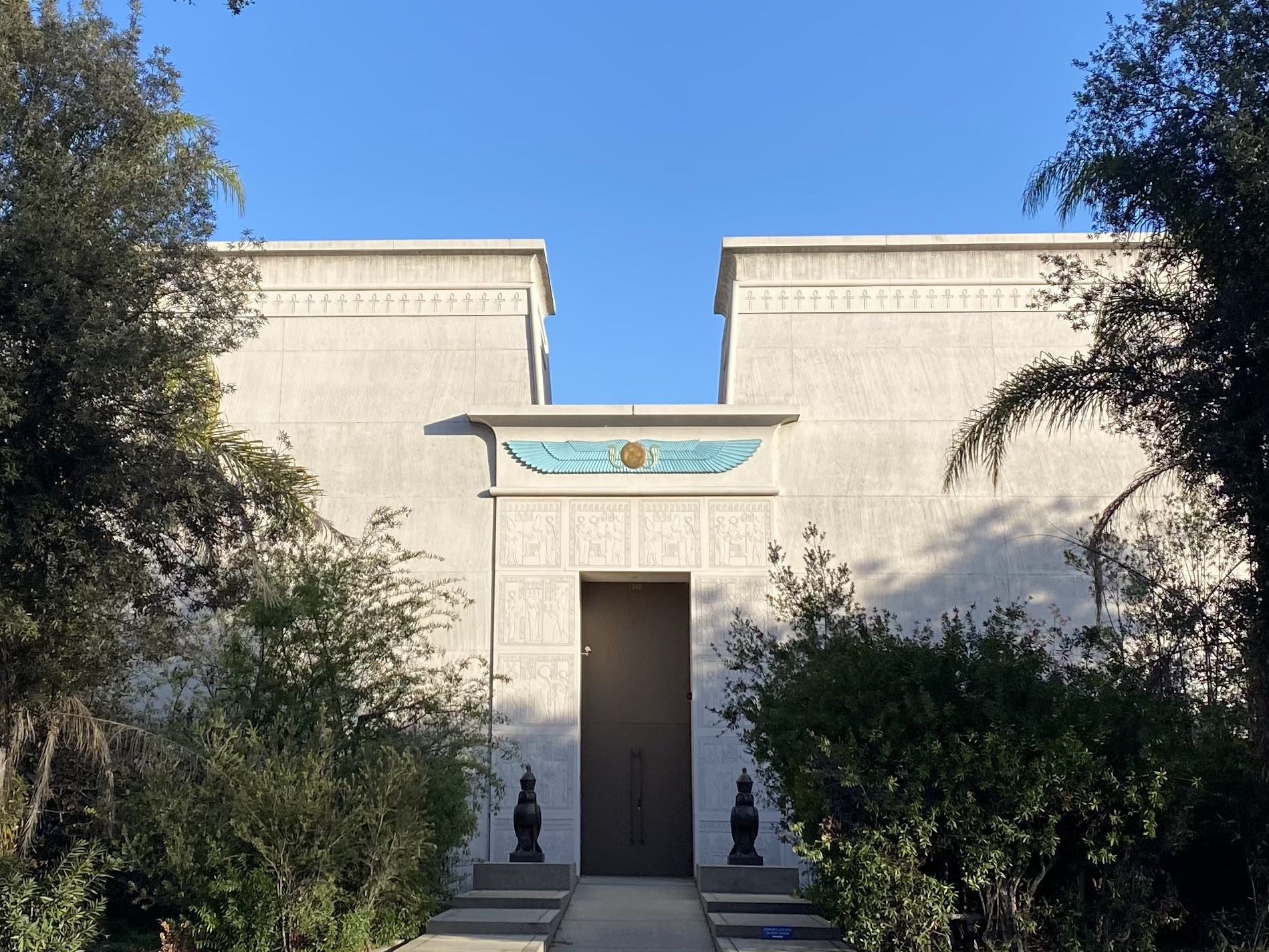
Ancient Mystical Order Rosae Crucis
