= San Jose Municipal Rose Garden =

Historic American rose garden in San Jose, California

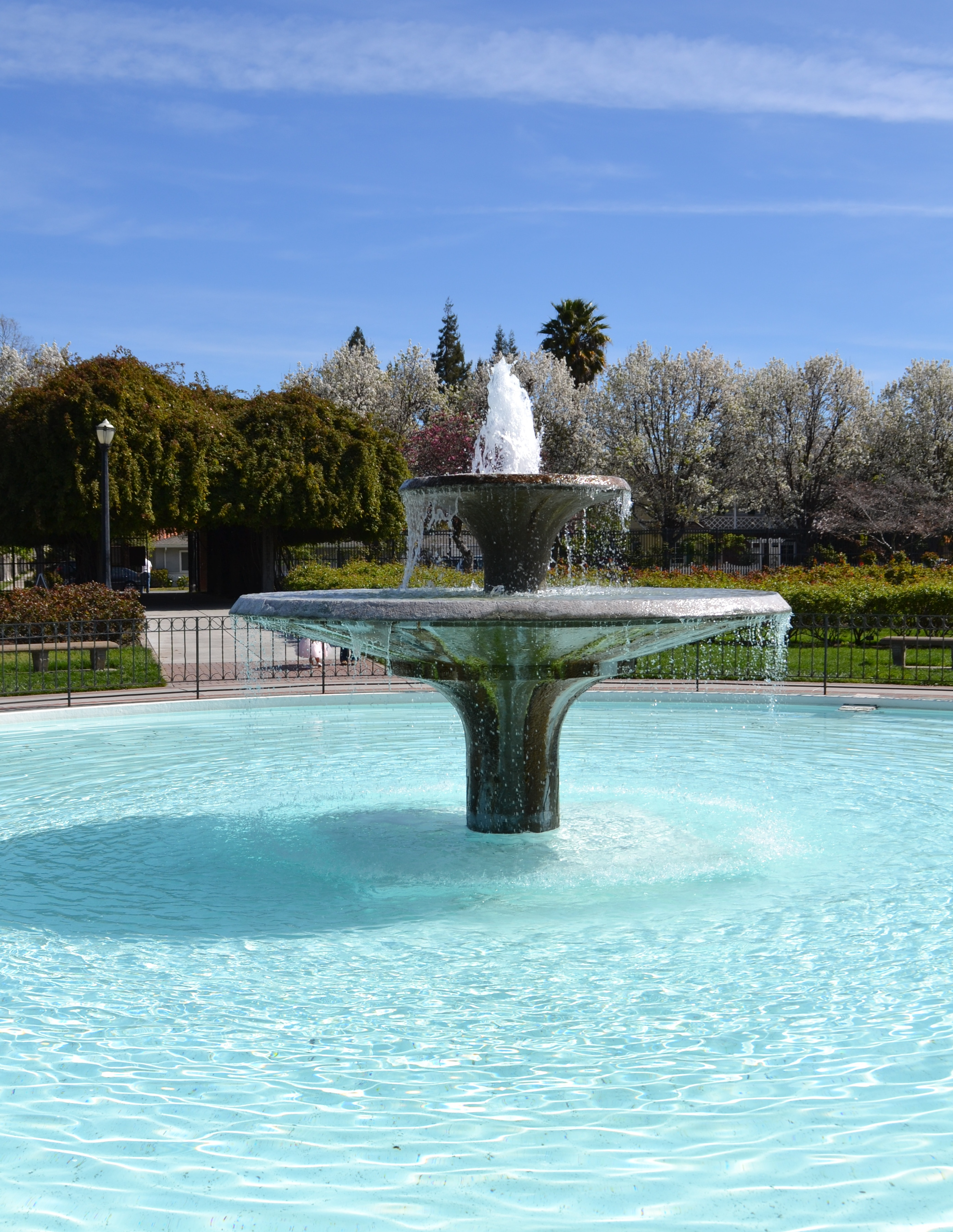
- SJ Municipal Rose Garden fountain.

- Location within San Jose, California
- Type: Rose garden
- Location: San Jose, California, United States
- Coordinates: 37.33176°N 121.92859°W
- Area: 37 acres (150,000 m^{2})
- Website: www.sanjoseca.gov/Home/Components/FacilityDirectory/FacilityDirectory/2295/2028

The San Jose Municipal Rose Garden is a historic rose garden in San Jose, California, in the Rose Garden District. Founded in 1927, the garden is exclusively dedicated to roses and features more than 3,500 shrubs representing 189 rose varieties.

The AARS named the SJ Municipal Rose Garden as "America's Best Rose Garden" in 2010, making it the winner in the first nationwide competition ever.

== History ==
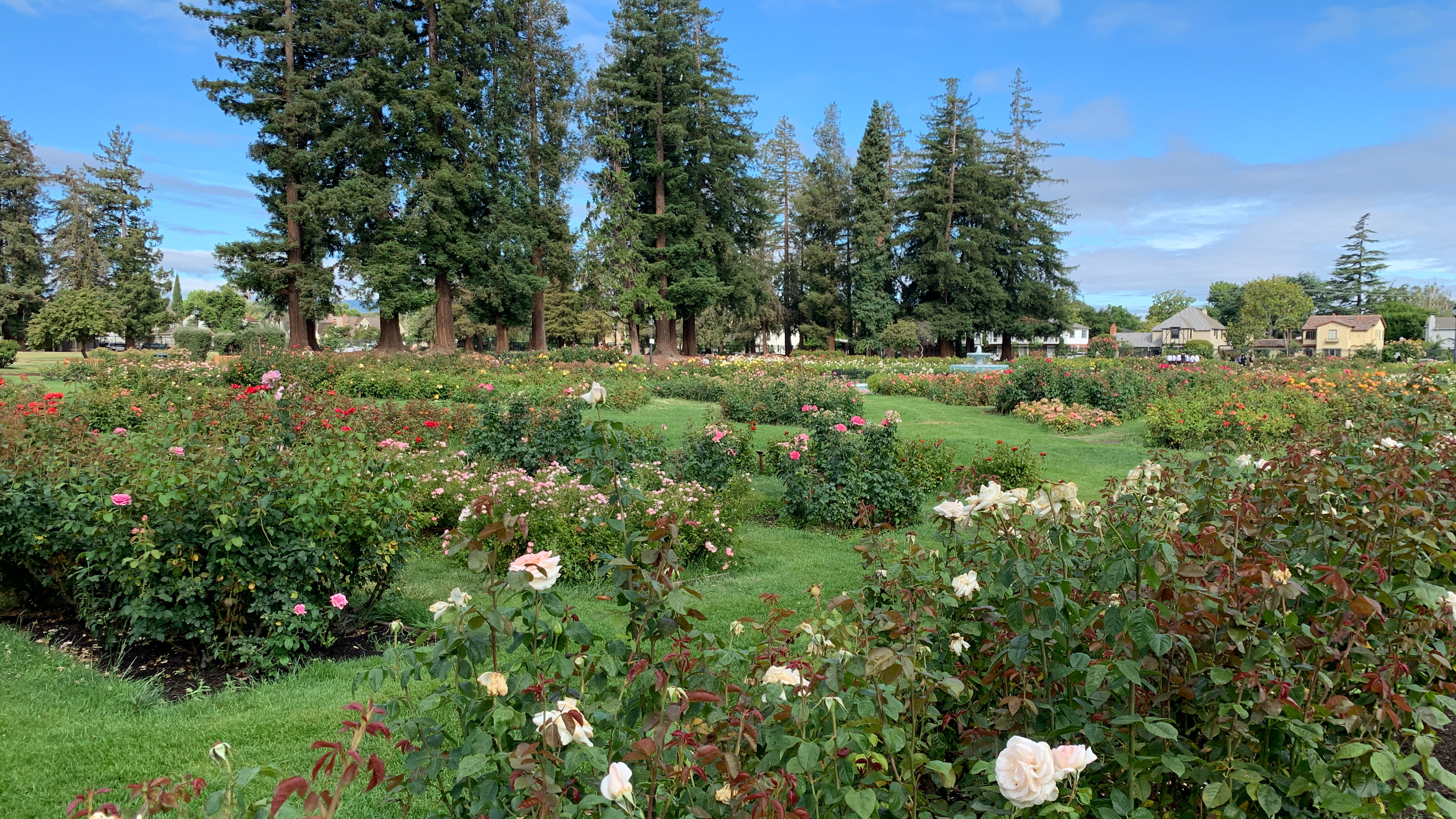
One section of the 5.5 acre garden.

The garden, 5.5 acres in size, was once a prune orchard, but was bought by San Jose in 1927.

The garden was founded on 20 November 1927, when San Jose City Council set aside 5 1/2 acres of an 11–acre tract of land for a rose garden. Its creation had been championed by the Santa Clara County Rose Society, which subsequently provided the roses for the new land given by the city. Groundbreaking took place on 7 April 1931 and the Municipal Rose Garden was officially dedicated on 7 April 1937, six years later.

As an official Display Garden for the All-America Rose Selections (AARS), the San Jose Municipal Rose Garden receives AARS award-winning roses in advance of public release.

== Awards ==
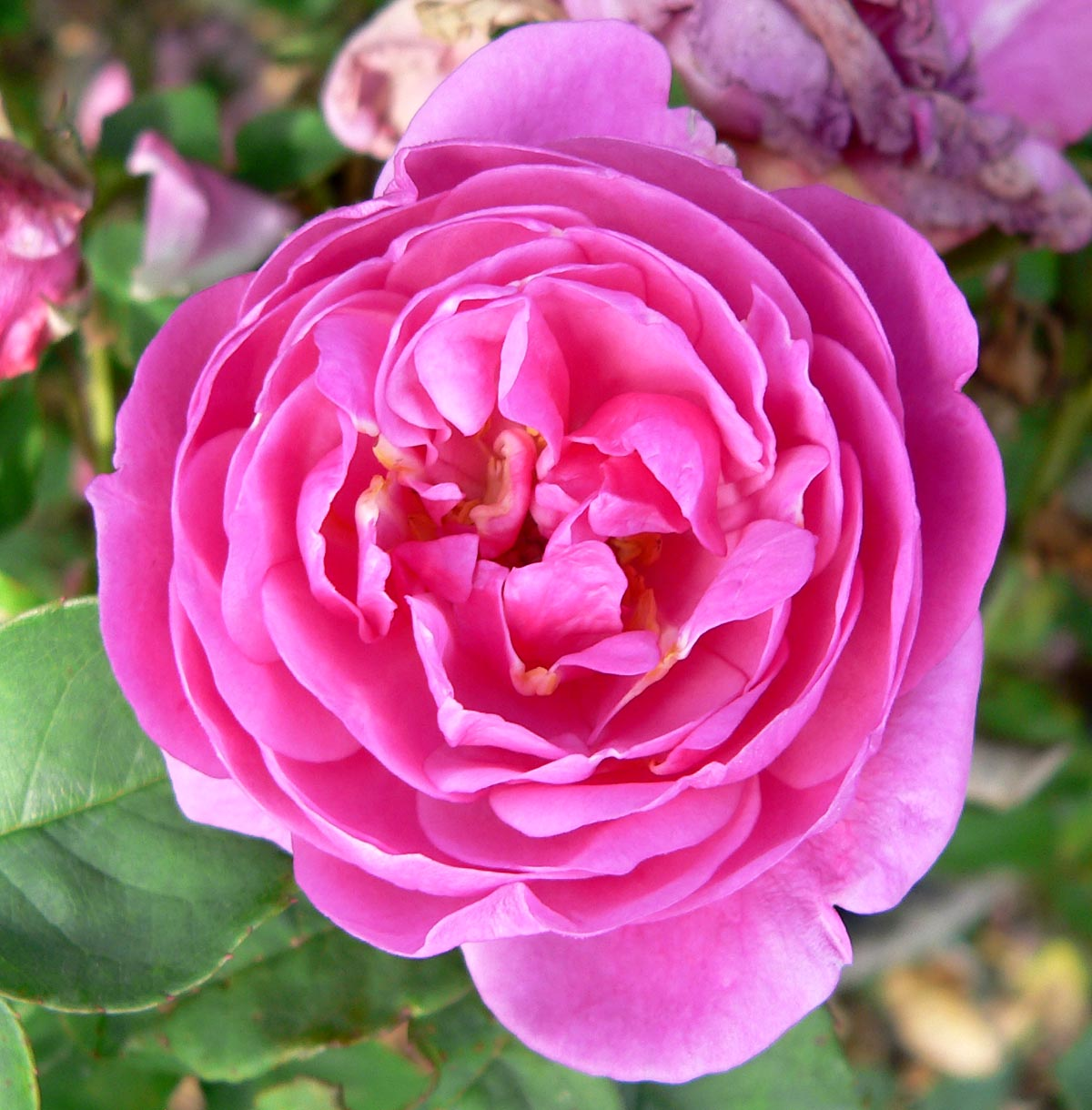
Rosa 'Bengale Animée'

In the early 2000s, city budget cuts impacted the garden, which led to the AARS placing it on probation. In 2007 Friends of the San Jose Rose Garden (FSJRG) was established, a volunteer nonprofit organization whose mission was to restore and renovate the garden. In 2008 the AARS lifted the garden from probation and restored full accreditation, and the following year over 800 new roses were planted as part of the restoration project.

On May 2, 2009, it was rededicated as an official AARS test garden, one of 23 in the US and the only one in Northern California.

On December 15, 2009, the restoration of the San Jose Municipal Rose Garden was nationally recognized on the Corporation for National and Community Service website.

On August 12, 2010, the AARS named it "America's Best Rose Garden", in the first nationwide contest of its kind. The winning garden was selected based on beauty, creativity and community involvement.

The Municipal Rose Garden is a City of San Jose historic landmark.

== See also ==
- List of botanical gardens in the United States
