= Thomas Fallon =

Irish-American politician (1825-1885)

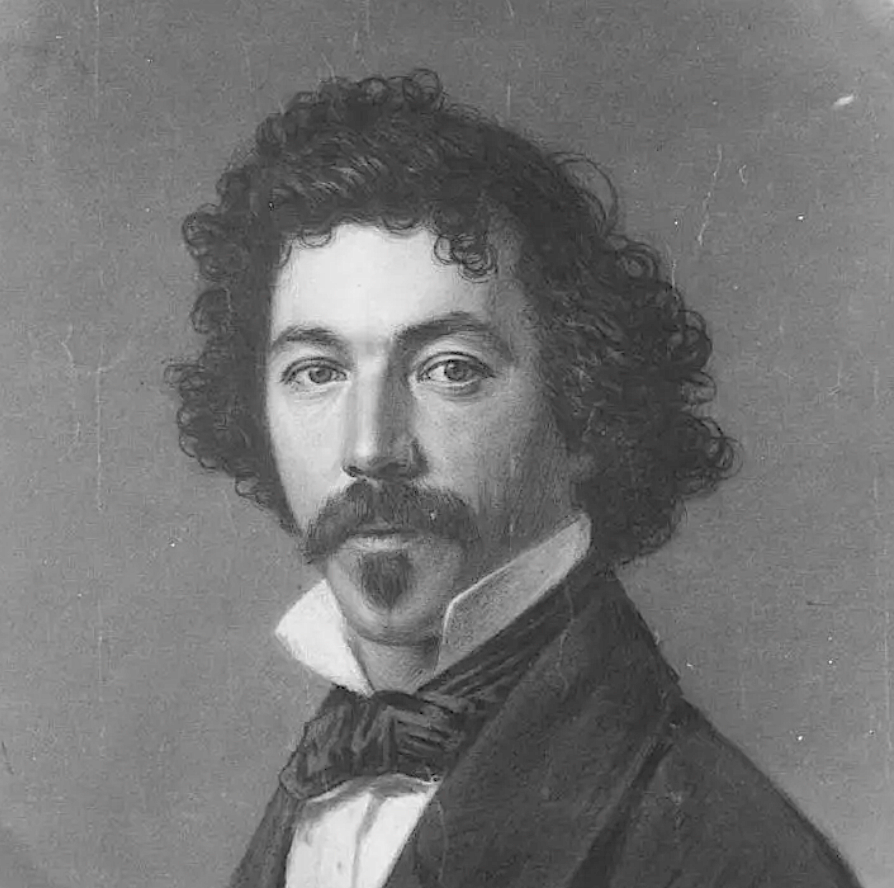
- Fallon (c. 1850)

10th Mayor of San Jose
- In office 1859–1860
- Preceded by: Peter O. Minor
- Succeeded by: Richard B. Buckner

Personal details
- Born: 1825 Ireland
- Died: 1885 (aged 59–60) San Francisco, California, U.S.
- Spouse: María del Carmen Cota

Thomas Fallon (1825–1885) was an Irish-born Californian politician, best known for serving as 10th Mayor of San Jose. Fallon remains a controversial figure in San Jose's history, owing to his role in the American Conquest of California.

== Biography ==
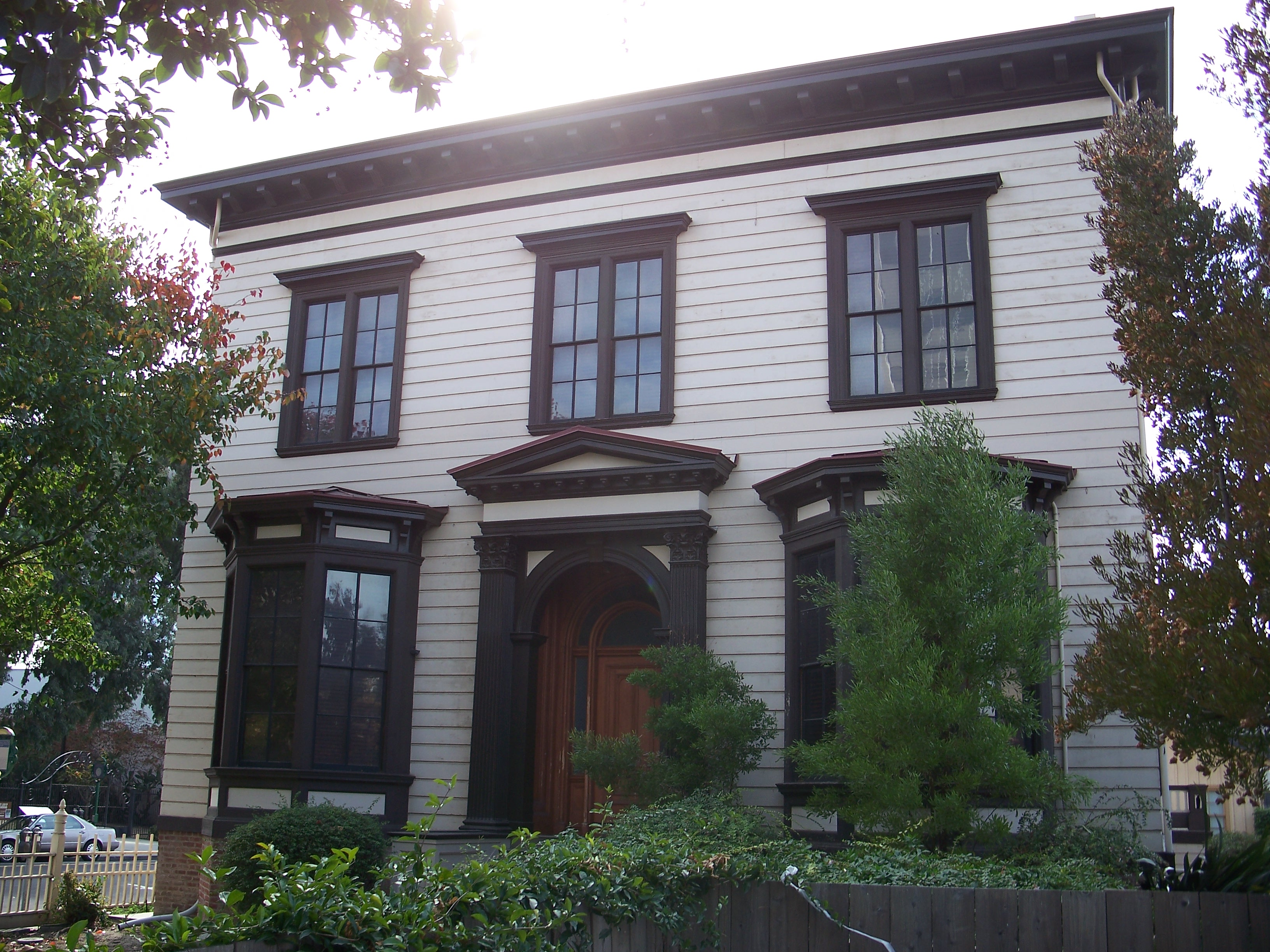
The Fallon House in San Pedro Square, is now a museum.

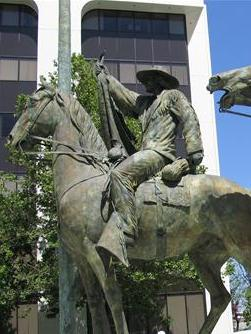
Thomas Fallon equestrian statue in the North San Pedro area of Downtown San Jose

Fallon's family moved to Canada when he was a child. At age 18, he was in St. Louis and joined the third expedition of John C. Frémont to California. Early in 1846, Fallon stayed in Santa Cruz after Frémont visited the area. In June 1846, he raised a group of 22 Santa Cruz-area volunteers to join Fremont, appointing himself captain. When the Mexican–American War began in California with Commodore John D. Sloat's capture of Monterey on July 7, Fallon's force crossed the Santa Cruz Mountains to capture the El Pueblo de San José de Guadalupe (now the City of San José) without bloodshed, on July 11. On July 14, 1846 he received an American Flag from Sloat, which he raised over the juzgado of San Jose, the pueblo's administrative building. Fallon's volunteers then joined Fremont's California Battalion for the remainder of the war.

After the war, Fallon returned briefly to San Jose, then back to Santa Cruz where he established a business as a saddler. At the beginning of the California Gold Rush in 1848, Fallon took a cargo of iron picks made in Santa Cruz to sell to the gold miners. With his share of the profits, he built a combination residence/workshop/hotel on the Mission plaza in Santa Cruz (where the mission chapel replica stands now). In 1849, he married María del Carmen Cota (1827–1923), commonly called Carmelita, daughter of local landowner Martina Cota Castro (1807–1890) and her first husband Corporal Simon Cota, owners of Rancho Soquel. Carmel inherited one-tenth of Rancho Soquel, 3400 acres of land.

In 1852, Fallon sold his plaza property to the County of Santa Cruz for use as a courthouse. Shortly thereafter, Thomas and Carmel moved their family to Texas. Following the death of their children, they returned to San Jose. In San Jose, Fallon began buying land in the area and built the Fallon House (1855) in Downtown San Jose. The house is preserved as a museum, across from the Peralta Adobe. In 1856, Fallon was elected to the San Jose Common Council. In 1857, he was elected to the city's Board of Trustees (which had replaced the Common Council) for one year. He was a council-elected Mayor of San Jose in 1859, and served a single one-year term.

According to one account, in 1876 (after 26 years of marriage) Carmel found Thomas and the family maid in a compromising position, and filed for divorce. Carmel used the divorce settlement to build several hotels and other buildings, including the Carmel Fallon Building (1894) at 1800 Market Street in San Francisco, now part of the San Francisco LGBT Community Center. Thomas Fallon died in San Francisco in 1885.

== Legacy ==
In the 1980s, San Jose Mayor Tom McEnery had the city commission a statue of Fallon raising the U.S. flag in San Jose at a cost of over $800,000. The statue was completed in 1988, and was scheduled to be located in the City Park Plaza (now known as Plaza de César Chávez) near the site of the flag raising. However local groups, including Hispanic Americans, protested that Fallon represented American imperialism and repression of the Mexican population. The statue was stored until 2002, when it was finally displayed in Pellier Park northwest of the original proposed location, near Julian and St. James Streets.

In 2020, such criticisms were revived in the aftermath to the murder of George Floyd and more specifically to the grand jury's decision over the shooting of Breonna Taylor. On the day of the grand jury's decision and following evening, peaceful protests occurred in San Jose around the same area where the statue is located. However, some protesters surrounded the statue, vandalized it including with anti-police messages, and then set it on fire. Then San Jose mayor Sam Liccardo talked with historians and community leaders and residents on what to do with the statue. It was ultimately removed April 24, 2023. The city will keep it unless a museum or educational institution requests it.

Political offices
Preceded by Peter O. Minor	Mayor of San Jose; 1859–1860	Succeeded by Richard B. Buckner
