= North San Pedro =

North San Pedro can refer to:

- North San Pedro, Texas, a census-designated place of Nueces County, Texas
- North San Pedro, San Jose, a neighborhood of San Jose, California
