= San Pedro Square =

- Neighborhood of San Jose
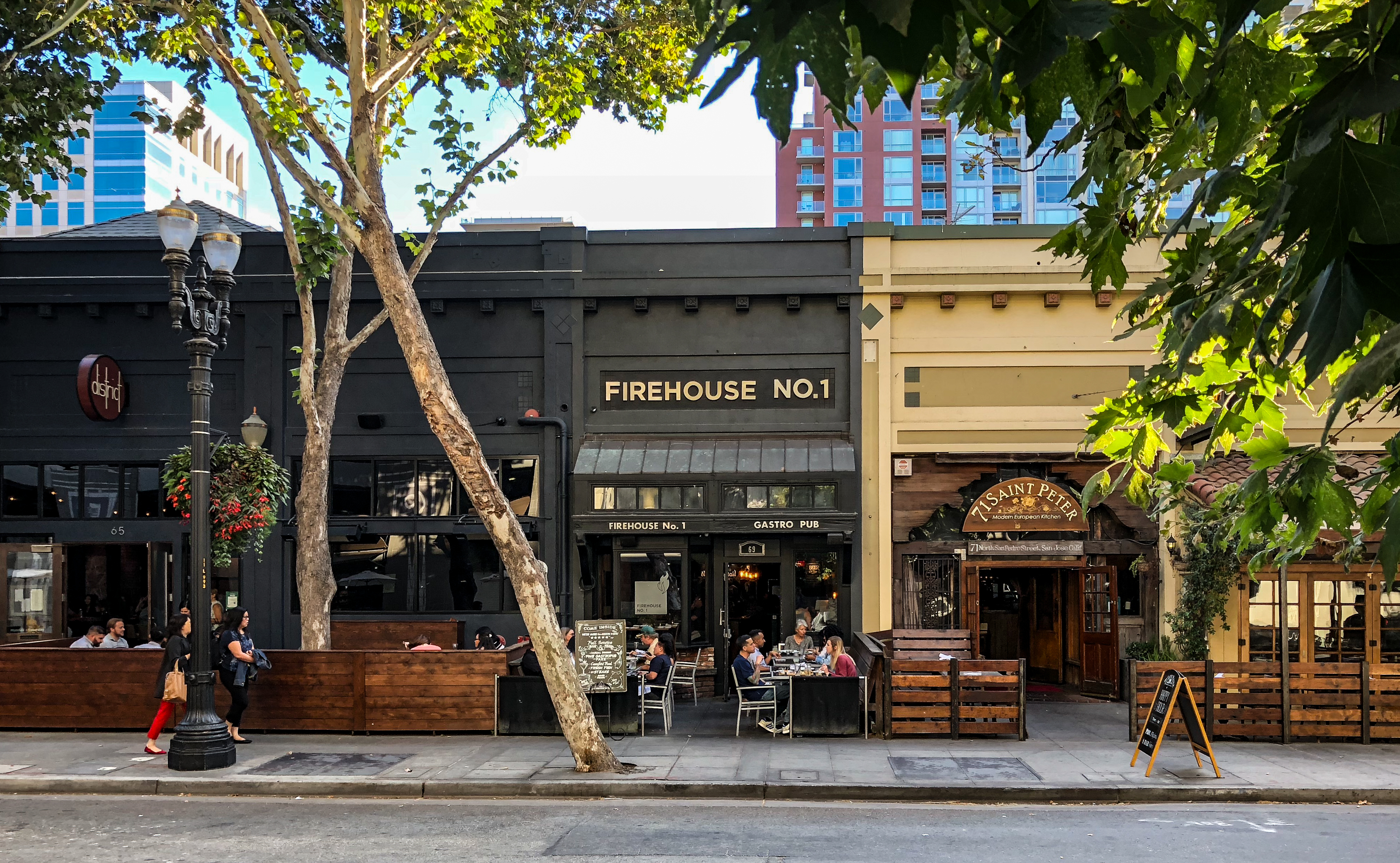
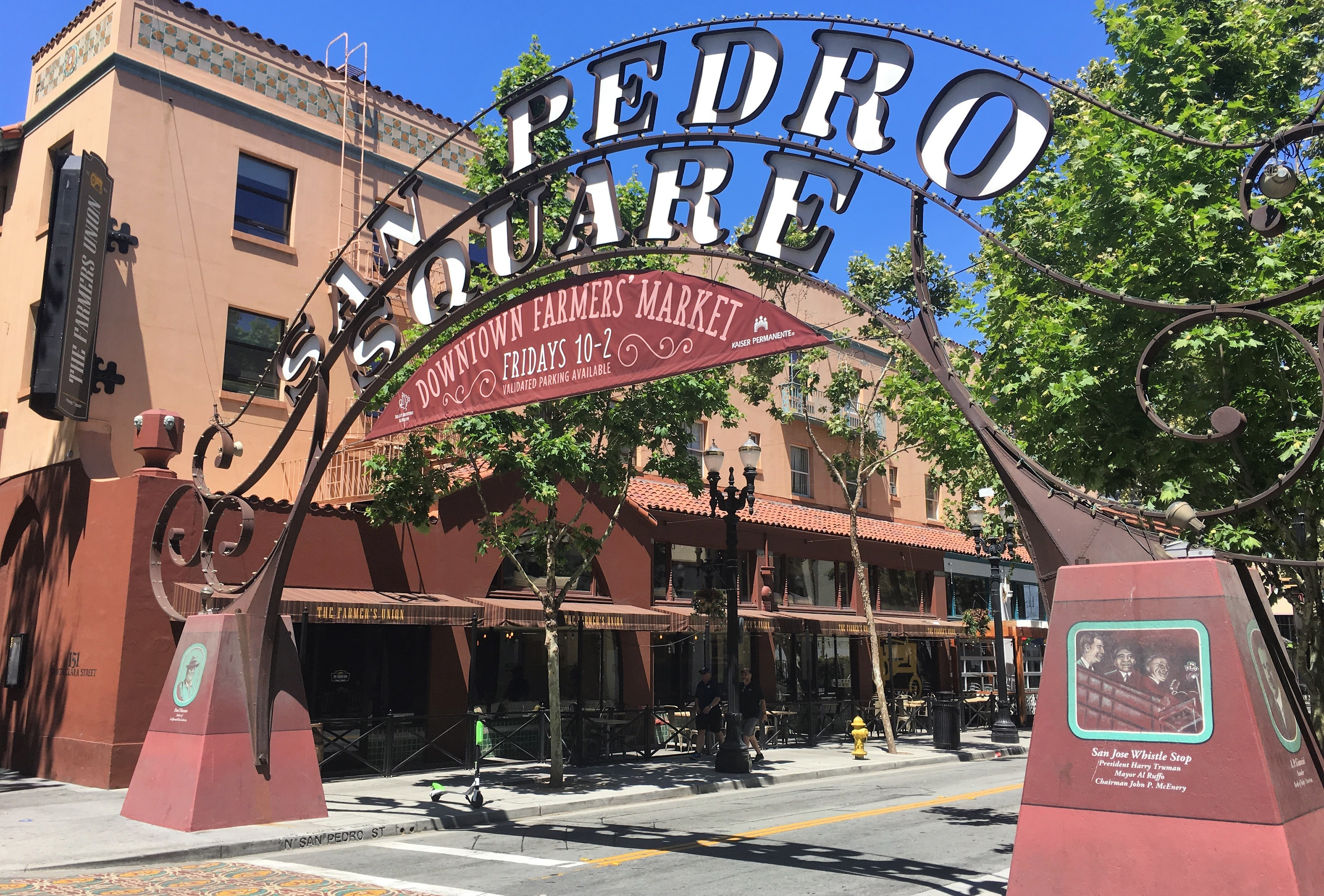
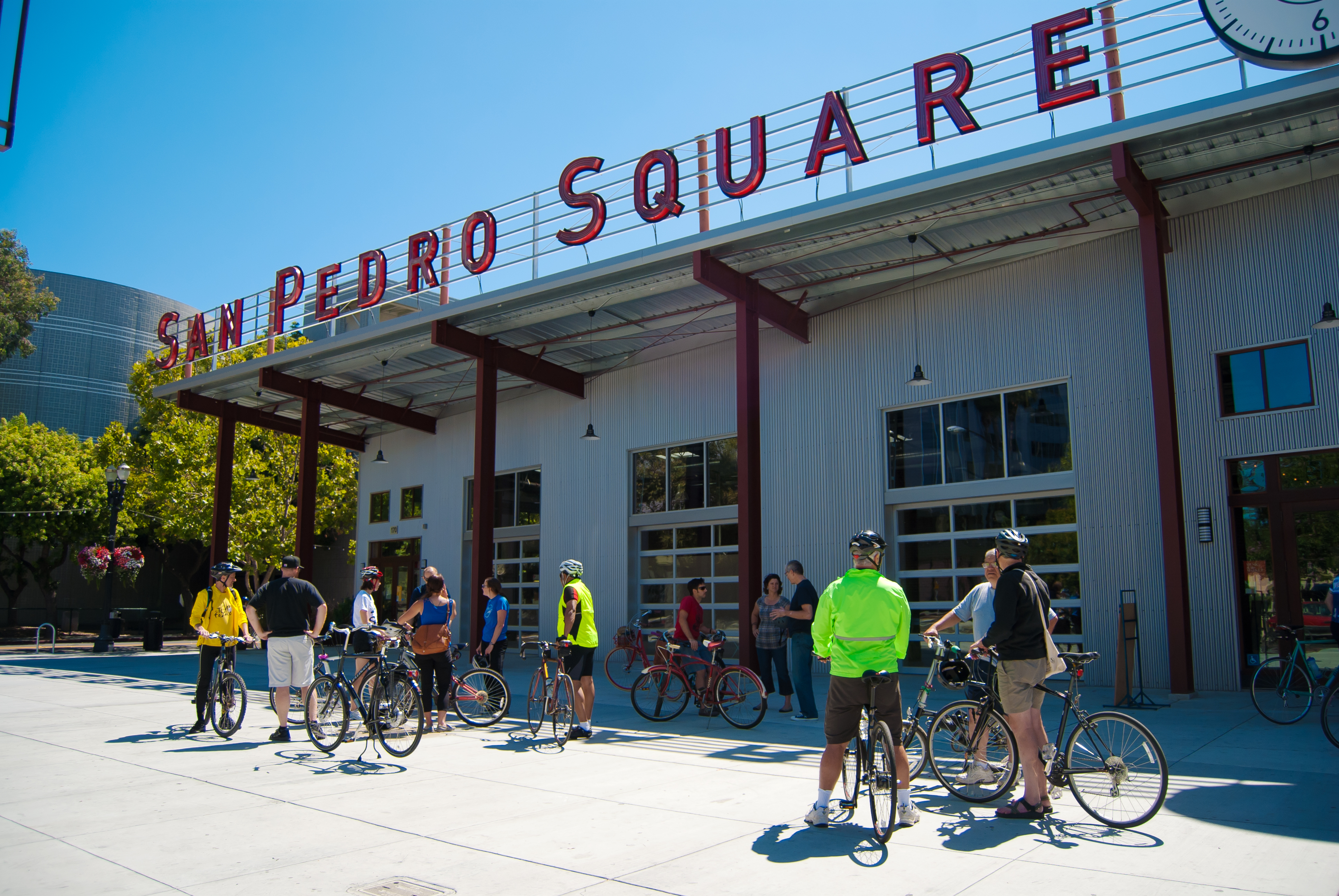

- Location within San Jose
- Coordinates: 37.33681°N 121.89415°W
- Country: United States
- State: California
- County: Santa Clara
- City: San Jose
- Established: 1797

San Pedro Square is a historic neighborhood of San Jose, California, located in northern Downtown San Jose. One of San Jose's oldest districts, San Pedro Square today is a popular dining and entertainment destination for Downtown.

== History ==
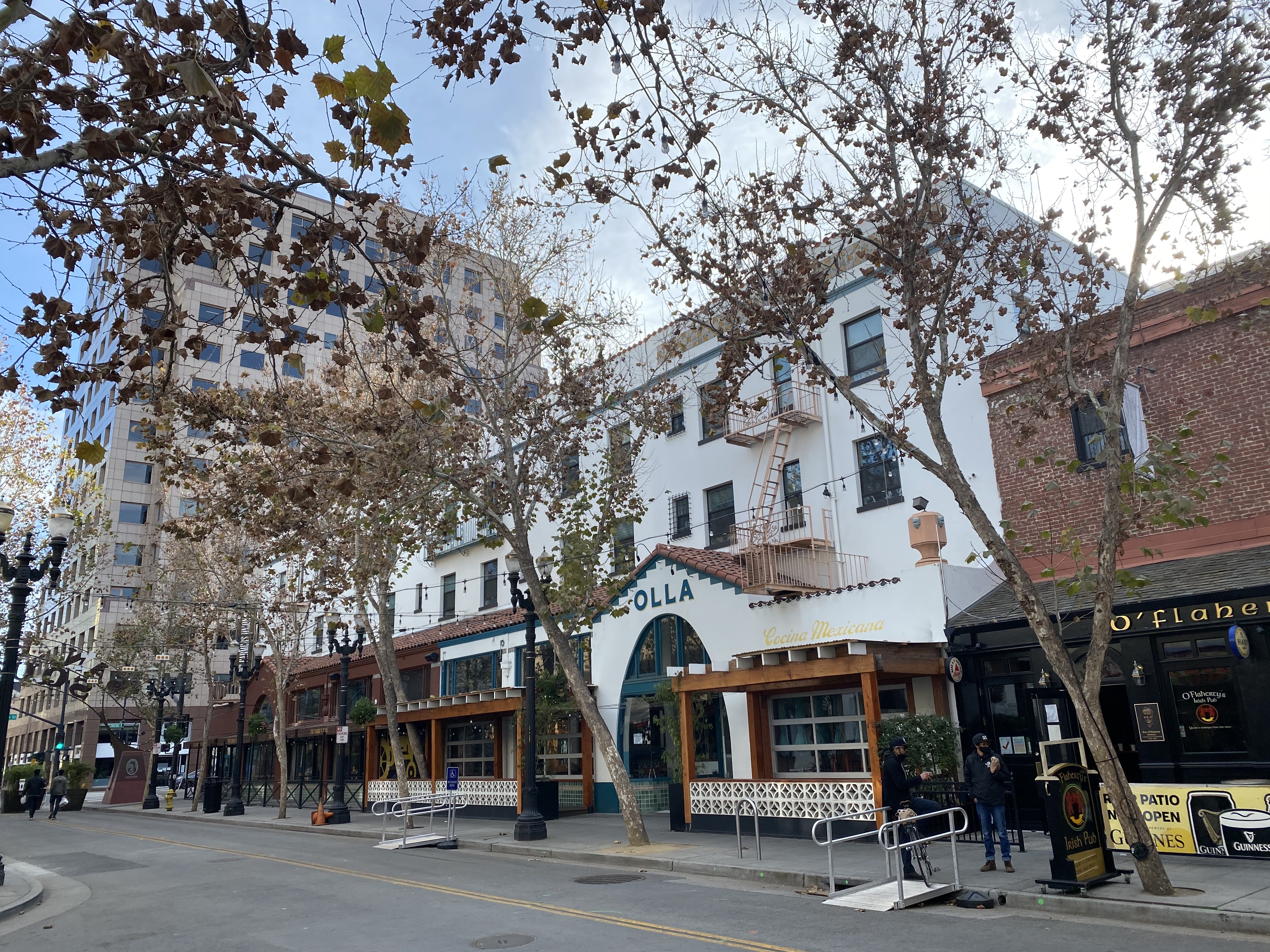
Restaurants on San Pedro Square.

The oldest district in the city, San Pedro Square is home to two National Historic Landmarks, the Peralta Adobe and Fallon House.

The Peralta Adobe was built in 1797 and is the oldest building in San Jose.

The Fallon House is an Italianate mansion built in 1855 by Thomas Fallon, mayor of San Jose from 1859 to 1860.

Today, San Pedro Square is home to San Pedro Square Market, a dining and nightlife destination in downtown San Jose, featuring a theater and many restaurants and bars. The square located in downtown San Jose also has apartment and townhome communities with good walkability as measured by Walk Score offering a comprehensive map of local apartments.

The neighborhood of North San Pedro is north of San Pedro Square, separated by St. James Street.

== Landmarks ==
- Peralta Adobe
- Fallon House
- San Pedro Square Market
