= Fallon Building =

Historic building in San Francisco

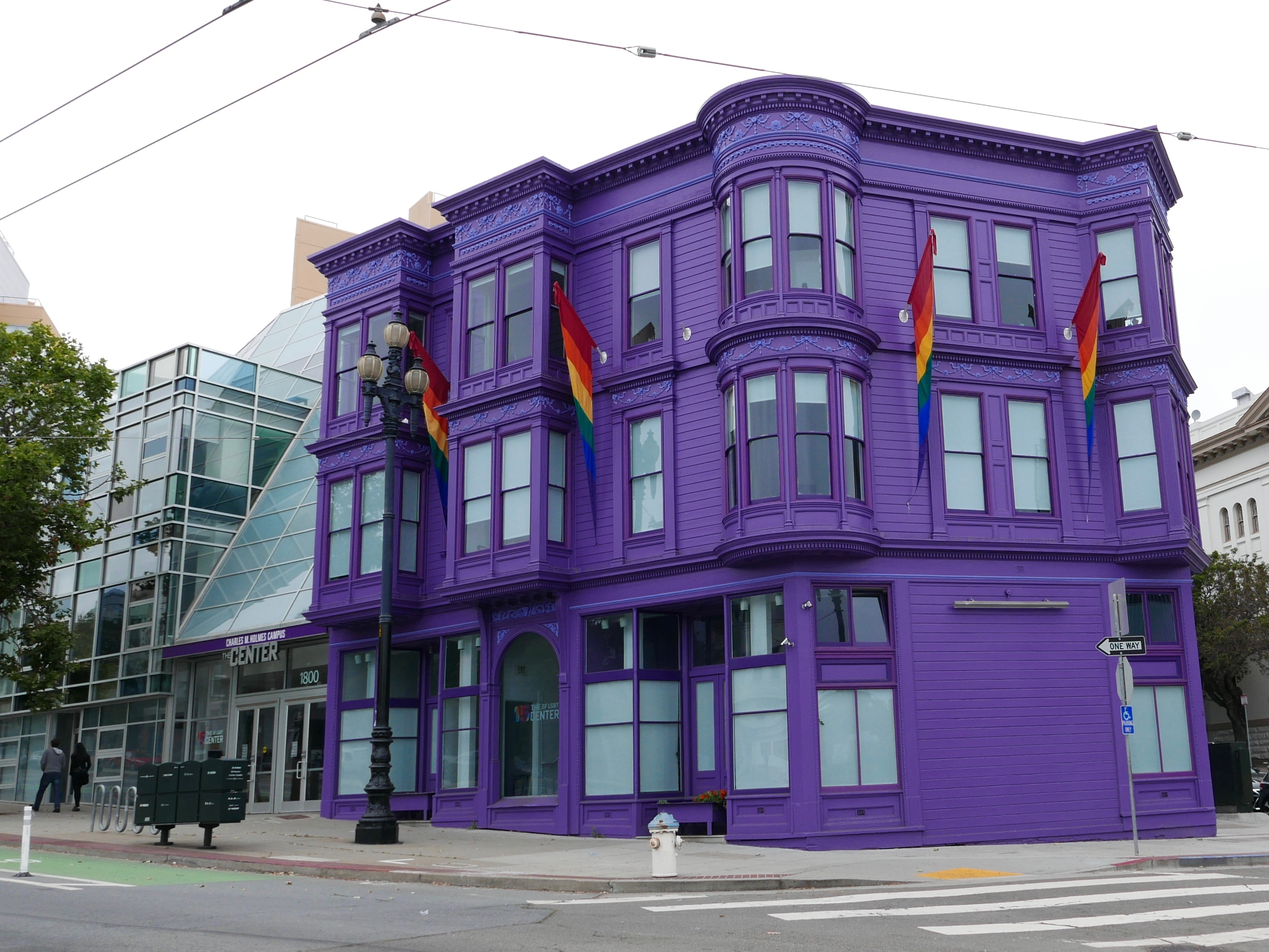

- Location within San Francisco County
- 37.772355°N 122.423938°W
- Location: 1800 Market Street, San Francisco, California, 94102, U.S.

History
- Built: 1894
- Built for: Carmel Lodge Fallon

Site notes
- Architect: Edward D. Goodrich
- Architectural style: Queen Anne

San Francisco Designated Landmark
- Designated: November 8, 1998
- Reference no.: 223

The Fallon Building, also known as the Carmel Fallon Building, is a historic mixed-use building built in 1894 and located in the Castro District of San Francisco, California. It is the home of the San Francisco LGBT Center since 2002.

The building has been listed as a San Francisco Designated Landmark since November 8, 1998.

== History ==
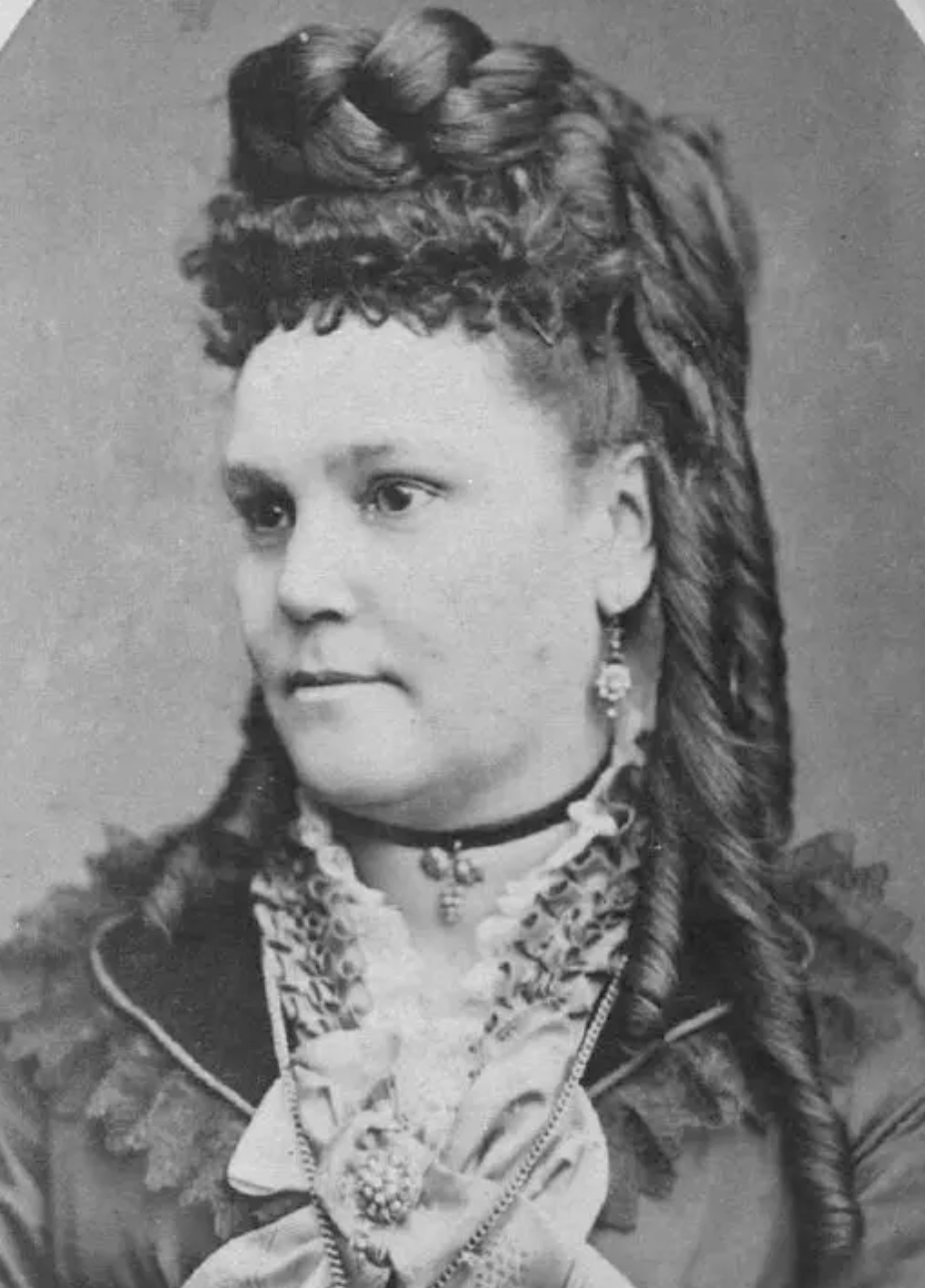
Carmela Fallon, c. 1850

The Fallon Building is located at an intersection corner at 1800 Market Street in San Francisco. The three-story, 6,000-square-foot building was designed by architect, Edward D. Goodrich in a Queen Anne style.

The structure was built in 1894 for Carmel Lodge Fallon (she has many variations of name, also known as Maria del Carmen Juana Josefa Cota Fallon, Martina Castro Fallon, or Carmelita Castro Fallon), a Californio entrepreneur and landowner, she had inherited land in the area of Soquel. She was divorced from Thomas Fallon, a United States Army Commander that had conquered the city of San Jose for the United States in 1846, and he later served as the mayor of the city. Fallon was also the niece of José Antonio Castro, the last Mexican Governor of Alta California; and the namesake of the Castro District and Castro Street.

In December 1996, the San Francisco LGBT Community Center purchased the building. The Fallon Building had been subject to decades long debates on architecture preservation, and subject to many remodels. The group, "Friends of 1800 Market Street" was formed by Jim Siegel and others, named after the address of the Fallon Building with the mission of preserving the architectural heritage of San Francisco, among other things.

== See also ==
- List of San Francisco Designated Landmarks
