= Hotel De Anza =

- De Anza Hotel
- U.S. National Register of Historic Places
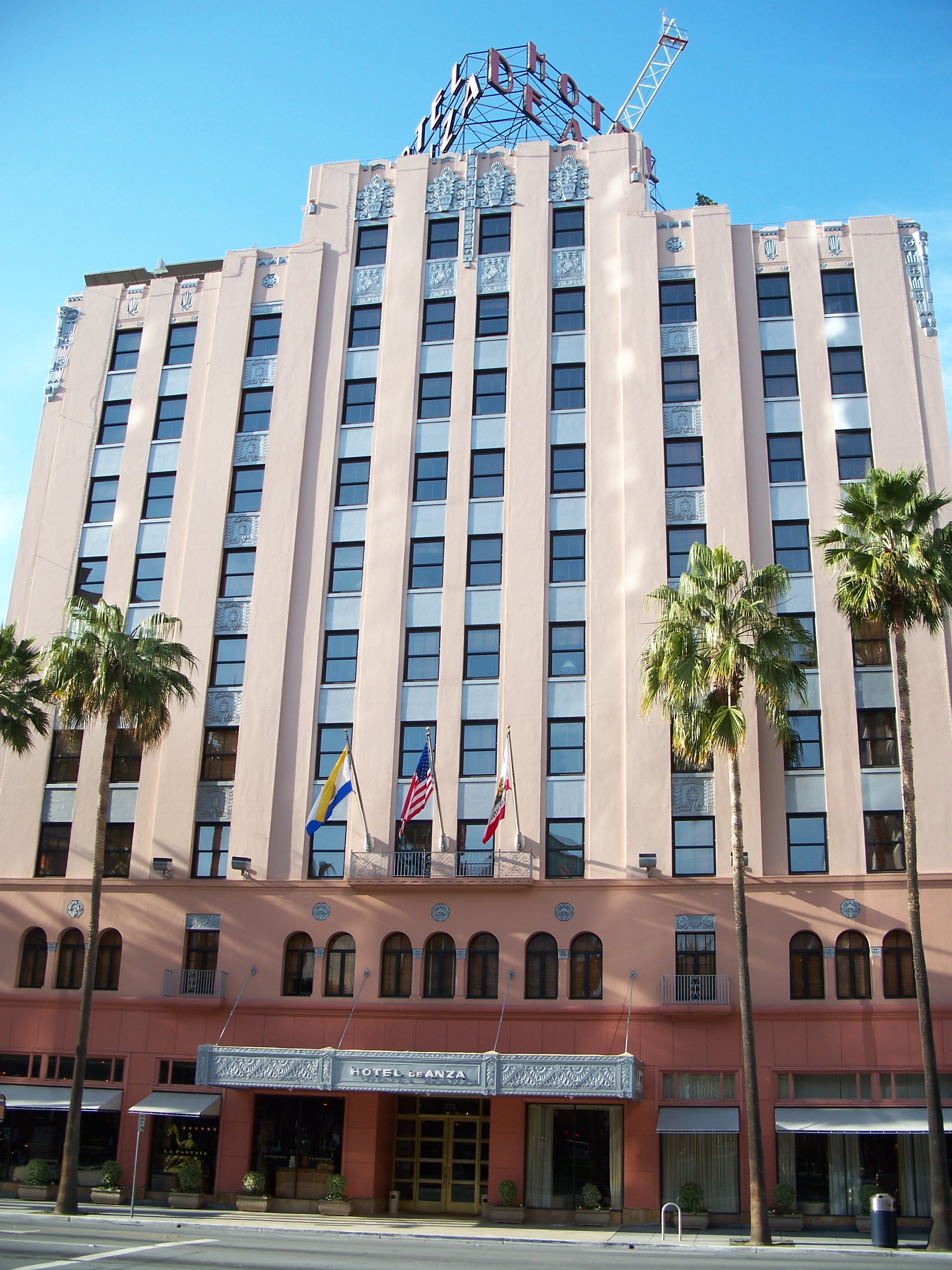
- Location: 233 West Santa Clara Street, San Jose, California
- Coordinates: 37°20′3.55″N 121°53′42.06″W
- Built: 1931
- Architect: William H. Weeks
- Architectural style: Art Deco, Mission/Spanish Revival
- NRHP reference No.: 82002266
- Added to NRHP: January 21, 1982

The Hotel De Anza is a historic hotel in San Jose, California. At ten stories, it once was the tallest hotel in the San Jose central business district, prior to the construction of Hilton, Fairmont, and Marriott hotels. Significant for its architectural style, it is one of San Jose's few Zig Zag Moderne (Art Deco) buildings. The hotel was listed on the National Register of Historic Places on January 21, 1982.

== History ==
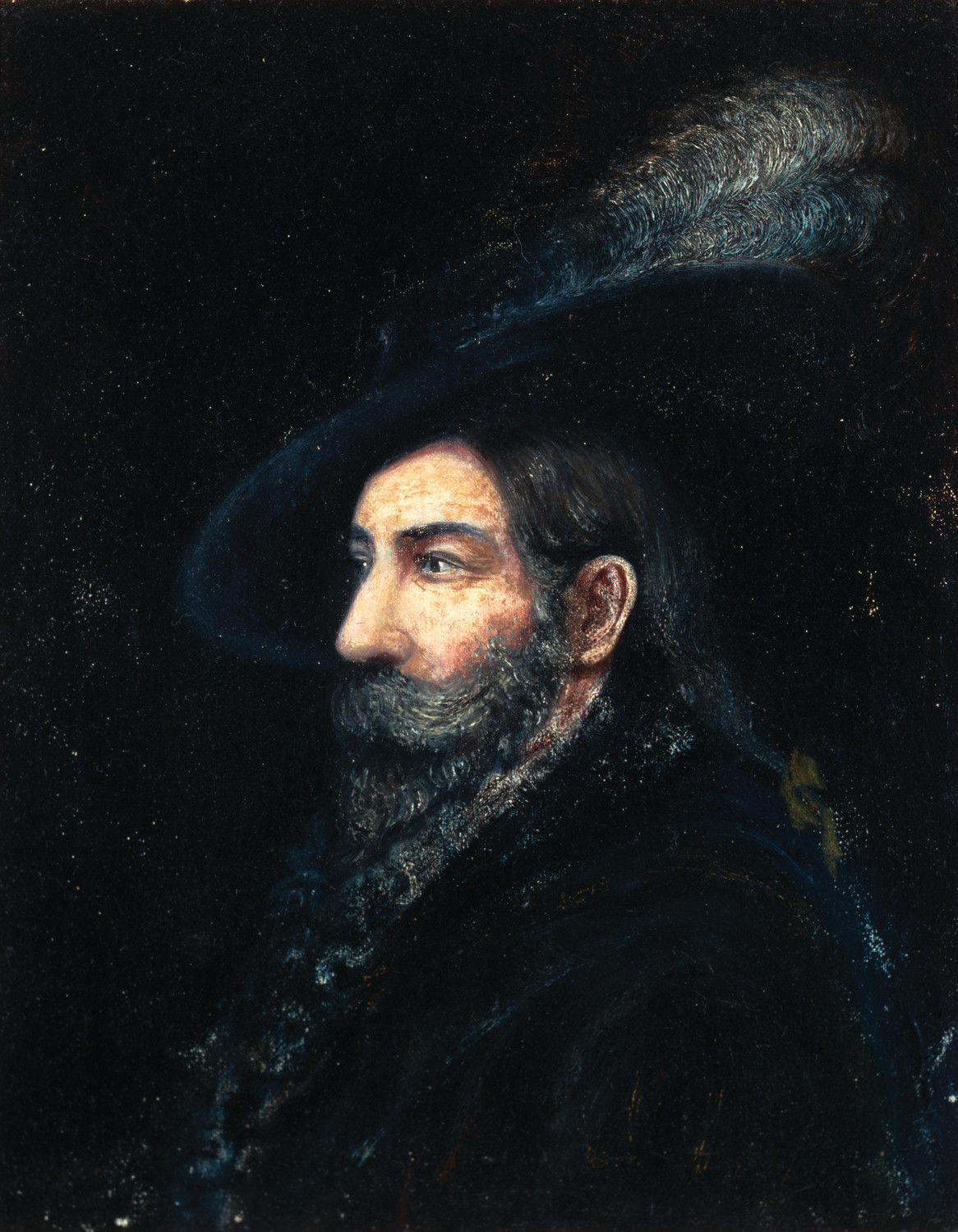
Juan Bautista de Anza, namesake of the hotel.

The De Anza Hotel was funded by the local business community, united in an organization called the San Jose Community Hotel Corporation. The hotel took three years of planning by this group and subscriptions of shares to be issued were obtained from more than 200 local citizens. Architect W. H. Weeks was the building's designer and Carl Swenson was the contractor. Local business leaders emphasized that the hotel would benefit San Jose and that the modern accommodations would help attract conventions to the area. Groundbreaking occurred on February 27, 1931, and was presided over by the corporation president, Alexander Hart, and many of San Jose's most prominent citizens and businessmen. It was originally planned to be called "The San Jose Hotel", but instead it was changed to be named after explorer Juan Bautista de Anza.

The facade features a 10-story central section flanked by a 9-story section on either side. These massings along with the building's zigzag parapet give it a stepped appearance. The first and second stories of the building house its lobby and mezzanine. Fenestration consists mostly of simple sash, double-hung windows except for the second level of the facade, which is highlighted by a band of 12 arched windows. The relief patterns include a string course separating the first and second levels, rosettes on the second level, and an elaborate art deco design through to the final two stories. Some Mayan influences can be seen in the design details of the stepped parapet. On the west elevation is painted "Hotel De Anza" with a diver used to indicate a swimming pool which is at the rear of the building within a small courtyard area. The hotel's west wall also features a mural by Jim Miner, "Life Abundant in the Face of Death Imminent", which was completed on August 12, 2016, and is easily visible to motorists along West Santa Clara Street.

The interior of the De Anza is distinguished by a main lobby where Art Deco elements are integrated into a predominantly Spanish Colonial Revival decorative scheme. The lobby reaches two stories in height and contains large wooden beams with stenciled colored floral patterns. Major factors of the interior design are the highly detailed wrought iron balconies, the huge wrought iron chandelier and double arch doorways. To one side is a fireplace with a huge canopy that reaches to the ceiling. Interior doors are all distinguished by their colored stenciled floral designs.

By the 1970s, the hotel had become run down and was nearly demolished. Instead, the San Jose Redevelopment Agency was able to save the building and arranged for its reconstruction, which cost twenty times its initial construction price. It reopened in 1990, fully restored. It joined the Destination by Hyatt division of Hyatt in 2019.

The hotel closed on May 30, 2024, at which point it ceased to be associated with Hyatt. The shuttered hotel was sold in November 2024 for $11.5 million, roughly half of its 2014 value. It reopened in December 2024, as renovations were underway.

== See also ==
- Downtown Historic District (San Jose, California)
