= North San Pedro, San Jose =

North San Pedro
- Neighborhood of San Jose
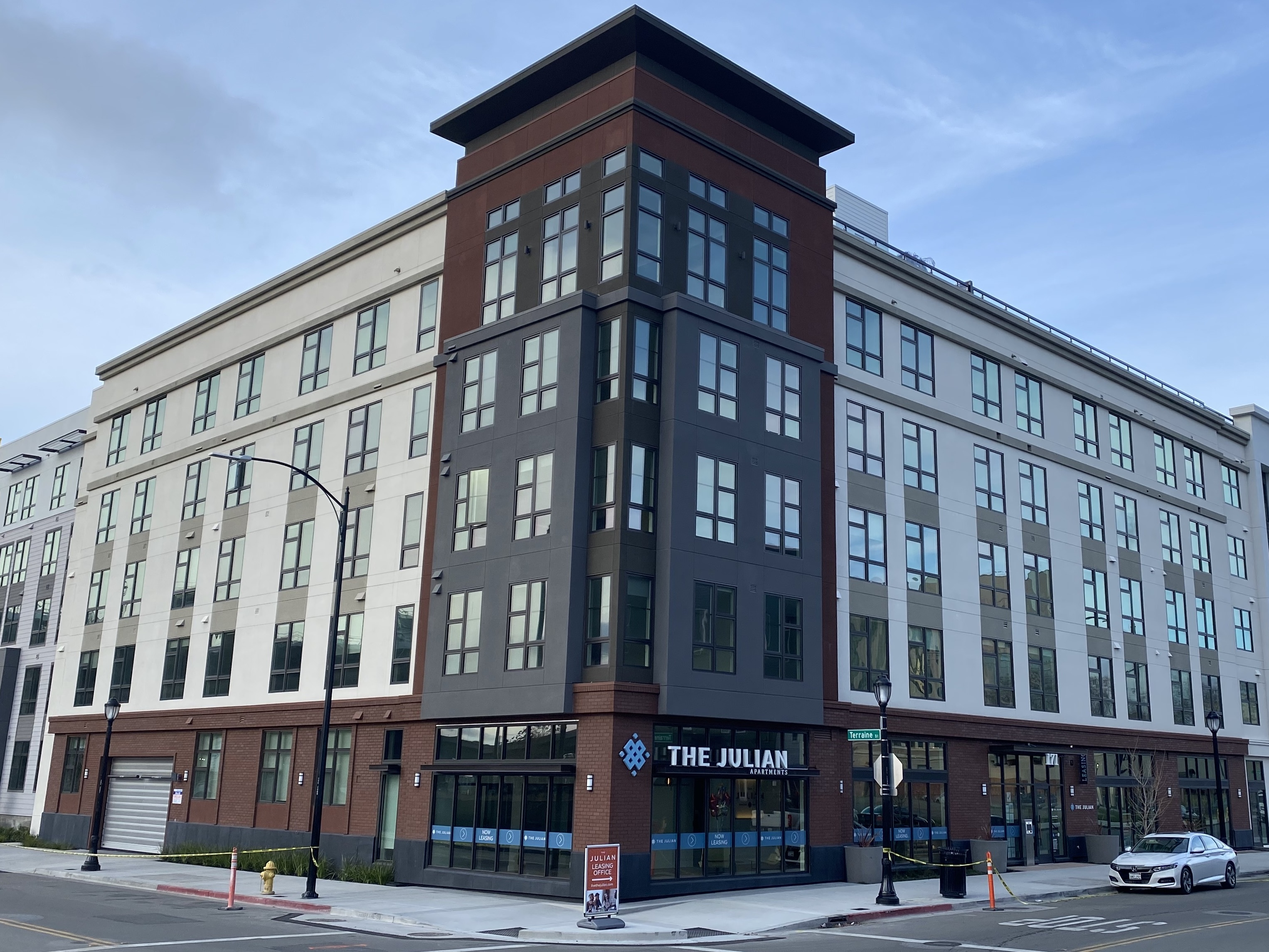
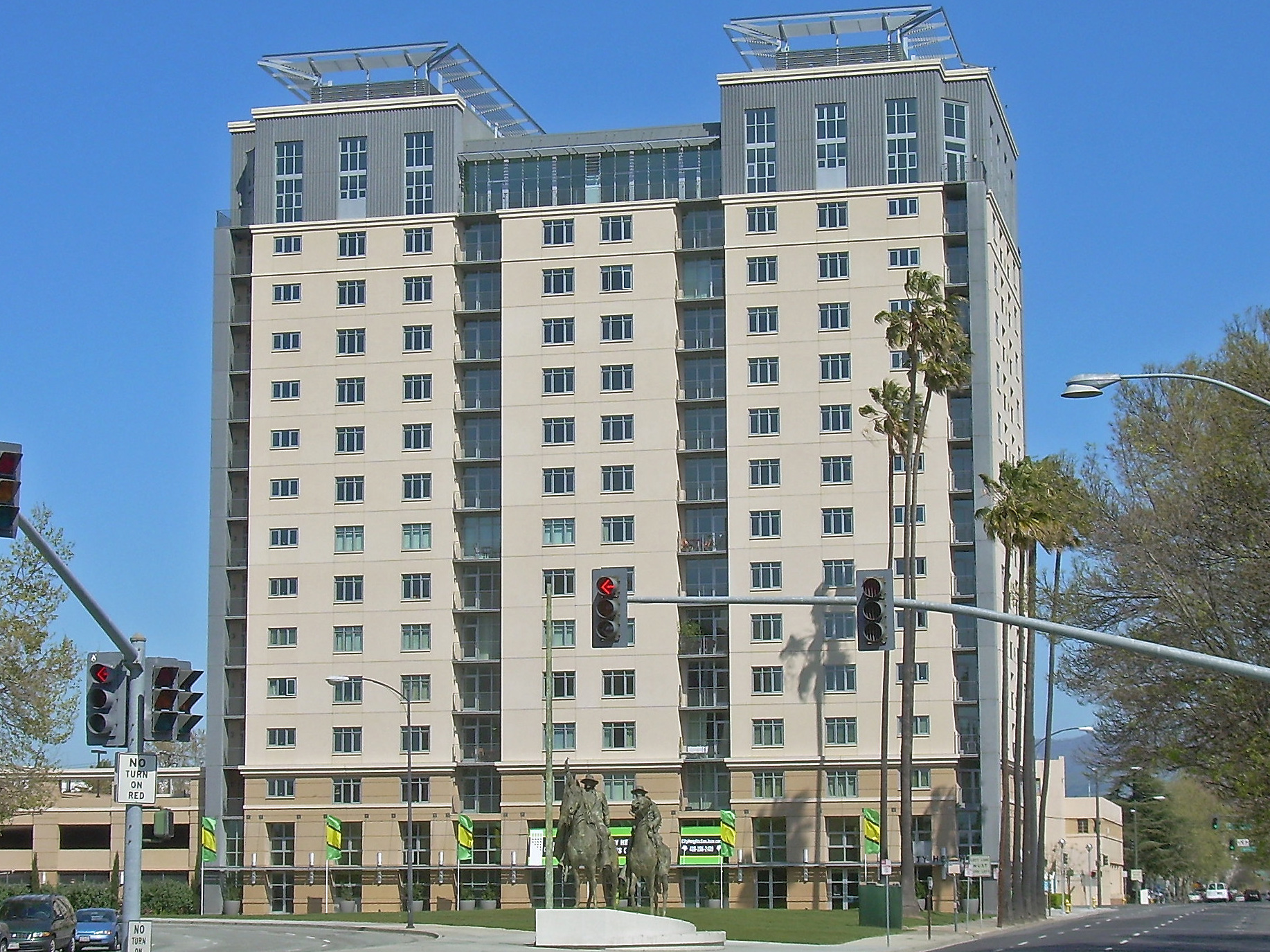
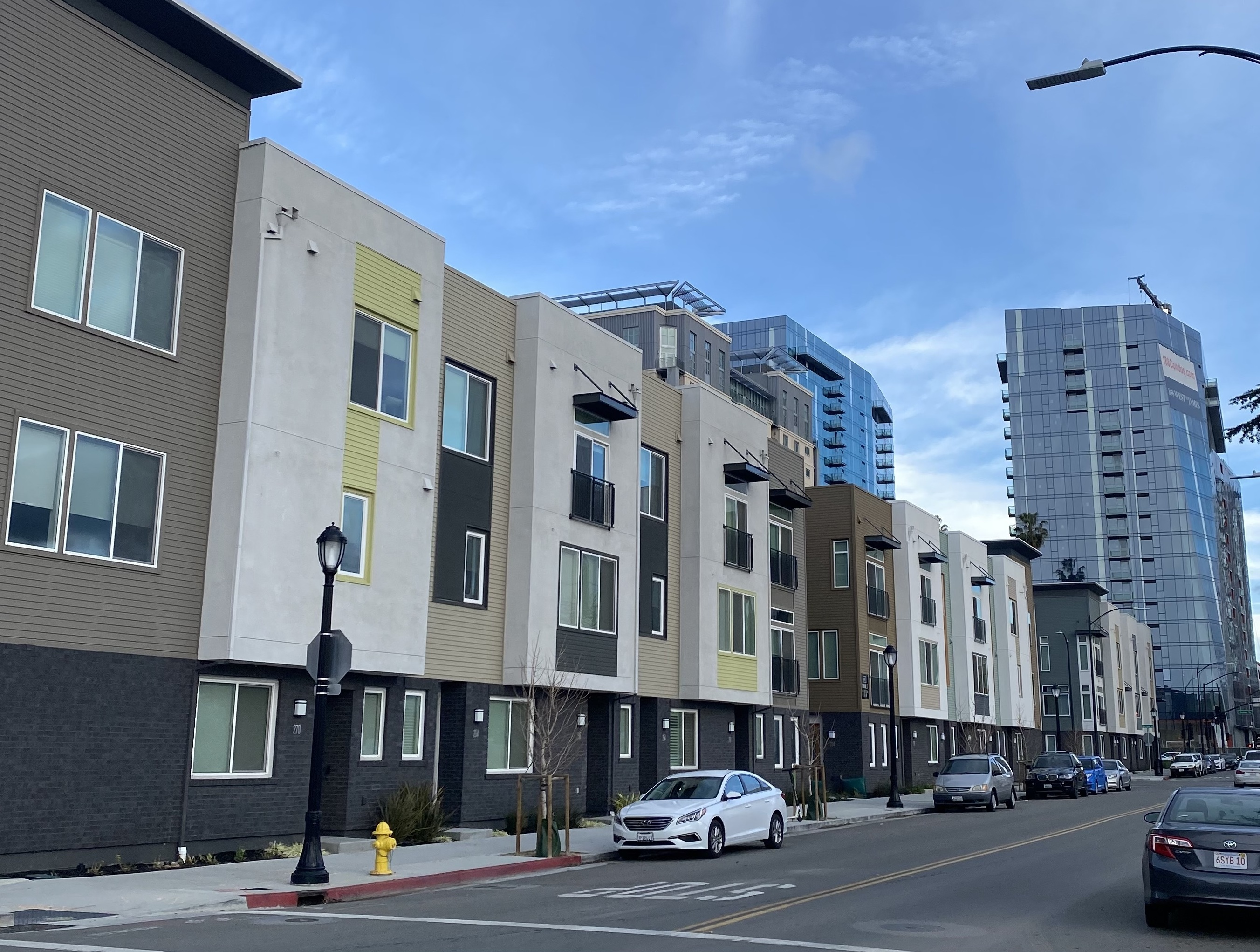
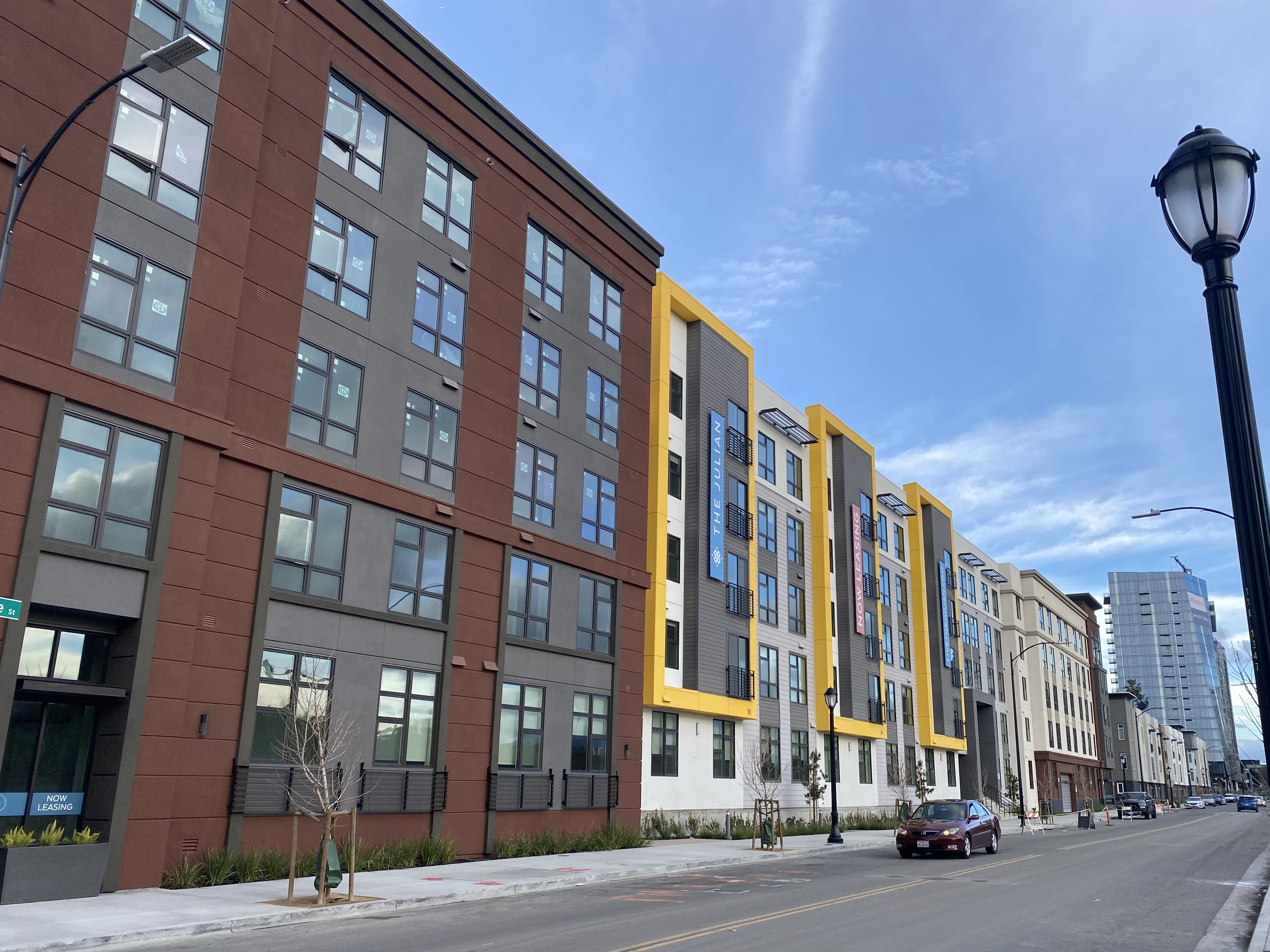

- Location within San Jose
- Coordinates: 37.339550°N 121.896174°W
- Country: United States
- State: California
- County: Santa Clara
- City: San Jose

North San Pedro is a neighborhood of San Jose, California, located in northern Downtown San Jose, just north of San Pedro Square.

== History ==
North San Pedro was a historically industrial part of Downtown San Jose, which was partially blighted during the age of urban renewal during the 1960s. Beginning in the 2000s, the San José Redevelopment Agency earmarked the area for redevelopment into an urban-transitional residential district for Downtown.

Since the onset of the California housing crisis, city leaders and non-profits have intensified housing developments in the area, particularly supporting affordable housing and transitional housing in the area.

== Geography ==
North San Pedro is located in Downtown San Jose, just north of San Pedro Square. Its western border is formed by the Guadalupe Freeway (CA-87).

== Parks and plazas ==
- North San Pedro Park
- Pellier Park
