= Peralta Adobe =

Historic house in California, United States

- U.S. National Register of Historic Places
- California Historical Landmark
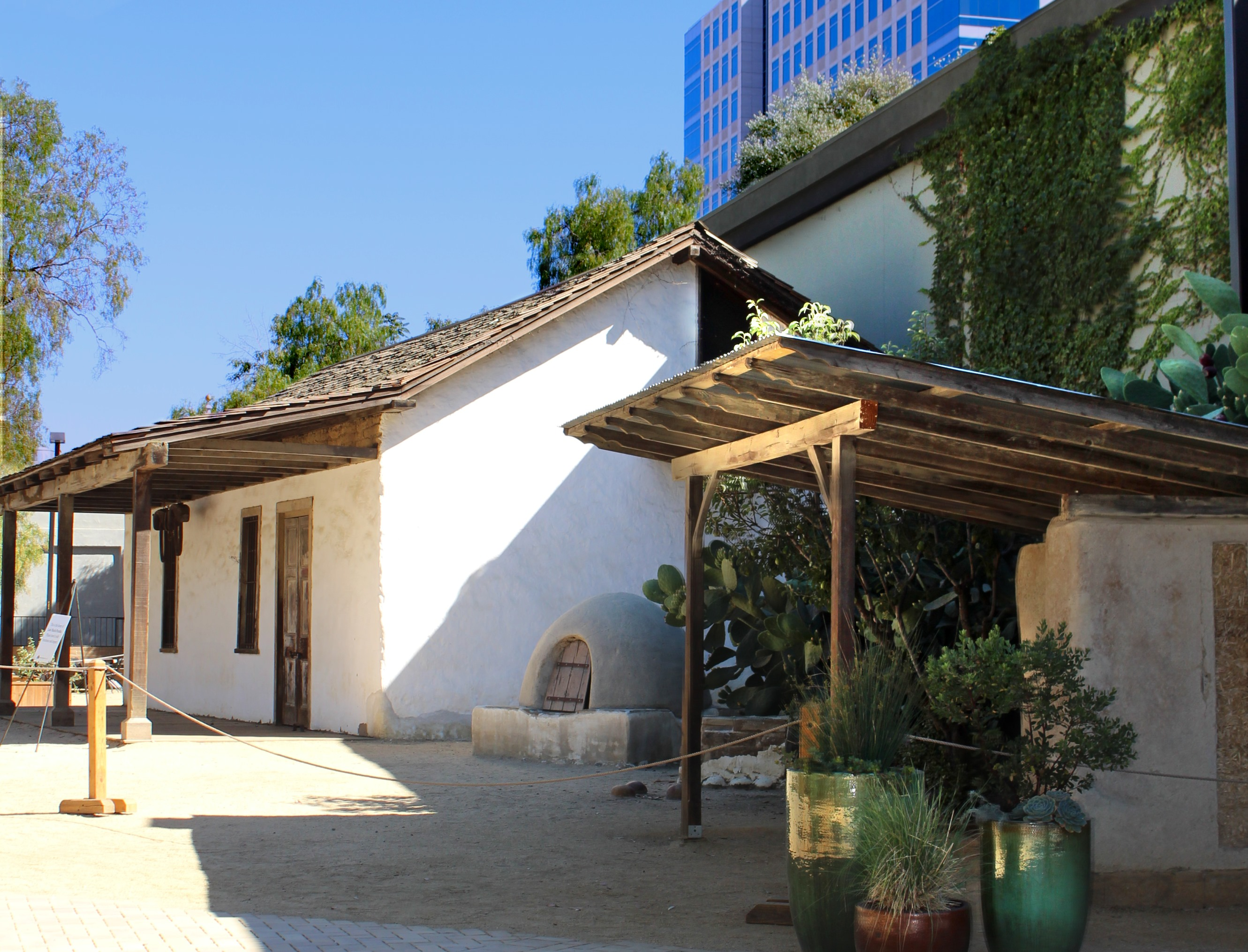
- Peralta Adobe
- Location: San Jose, California
- Coordinates: 37°20′11.05″N 121°53′41.11″W
- Built: 1797
- Architect: Manuel González
- NRHP reference No.: 73000454
- CHISL No.: 866

Significant dates
- Added to NRHP: October 15, 1973
- Designated CHISL: 1974

The Peralta Adobe (Spanish: Adobe Peralta), also known as the Luis María Peralta Adobe or the Gonzales-Peralta Adobe, is the oldest building in San Jose, California. The adobe was built in 1797 by José Manuel Gonzeles, one of the founders of San Jose, and is named after Luis María Peralta, its most famous resident.

== History ==
José Manuel Gonzeles (an Apache Indian), his wife, and their five children accompanied the Spanish Anza Party to California in 1776. He was one of the founders of the Pueblo de San Jose de Guadalupe, the first municipal government in California, established in 1777. This was the second house that González lived in, the first site was untenable due to winter flooding.

In 1804, González died and the adobe went to Luís María Peralta in 1808. Peralta was a sergeant in the Spanish Army, commissioner of the Pueblo of San José, and owner of Rancho San Antonio of the East Bay, one of the largest ranchos in Alta California. Peralta divided the house into two rooms, built a porch, a kitchen and a chimney. He died in August 1851, leaving the adobe to his two daughters.

The house was the property of María Josefa Peralta until July 1862, then it passed to María Dolores Peralta until 1866, and then to Baltazar Peralta (grandson of Luís María Peralta).

During the 1870s and 1880s, the adobe was used as a storage facility by Zeffiro Bastiani, Giovanni Spinetti, and later Lorenzo Scatena. In 1949, to make way for the construction of the Lusardi building in the adjoining lot, Giuseppe Bacchio had 17inches of the north-west exterior corner of the adobe removed.

Purchased by the City of San Jose in 1966, the adobe building was restored, and the surrounding park completed in 1976. The Peralta Adobe is San Jose's Historic Landmark #1, California Historical Landmark #866, and is listed on the National Register of Historic Places. In addition, the adobe was the first site certified as a component of the Juan Bautista de Anza National Historic Trail.

== Gallery ==
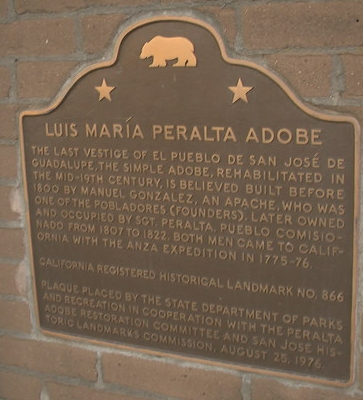
The California Historical Landmark plaque

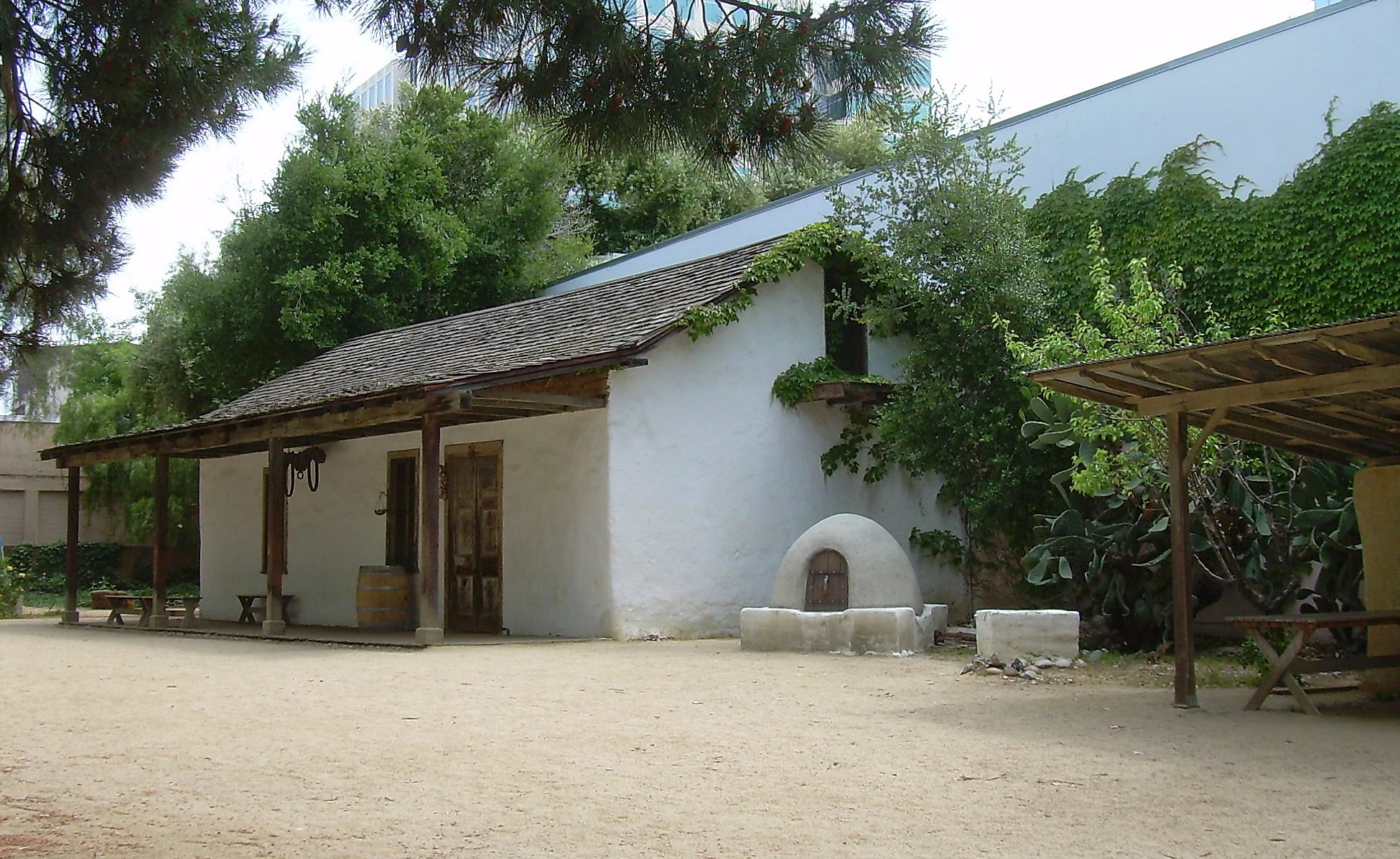
Front

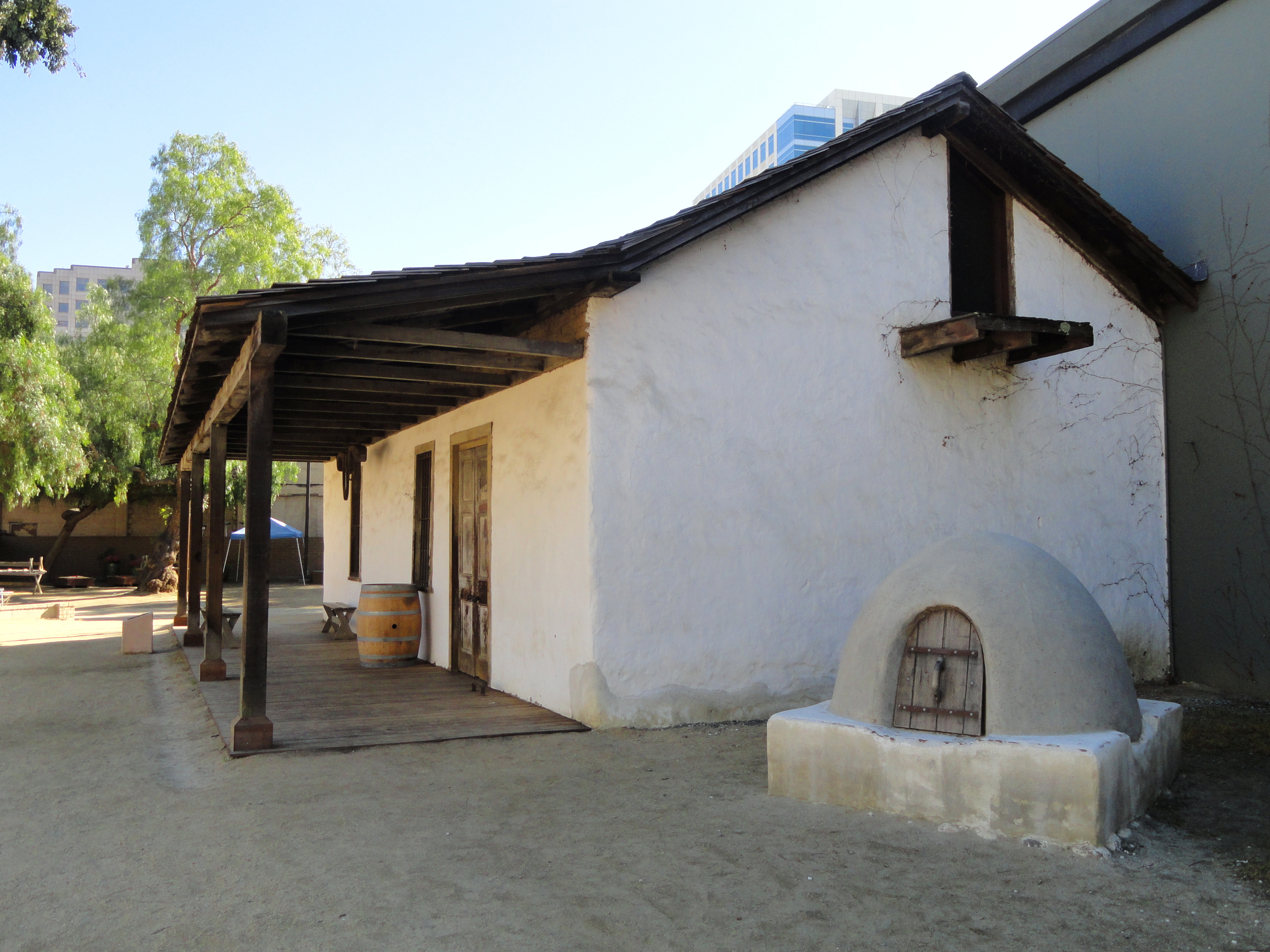
Side

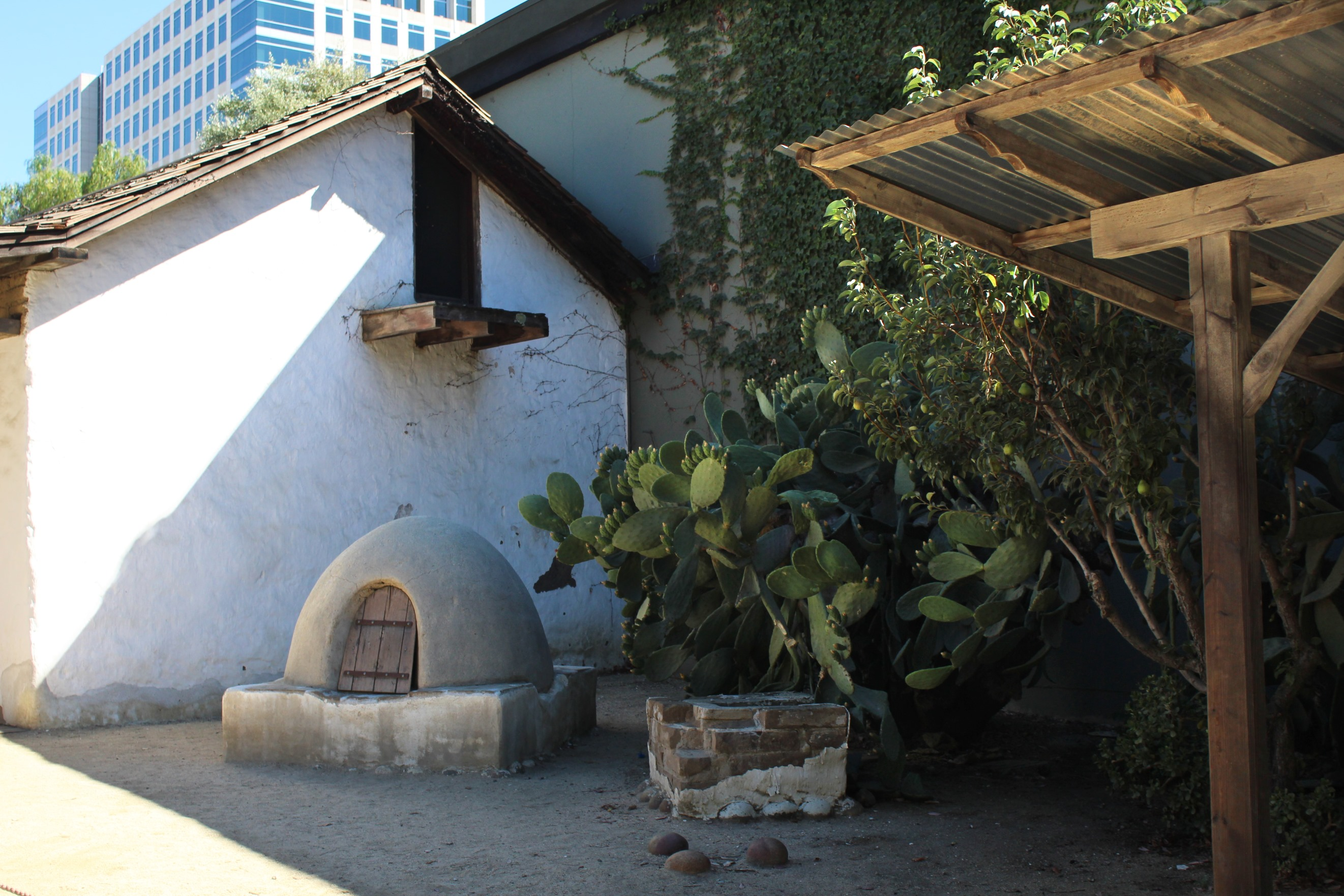
Close up of the side

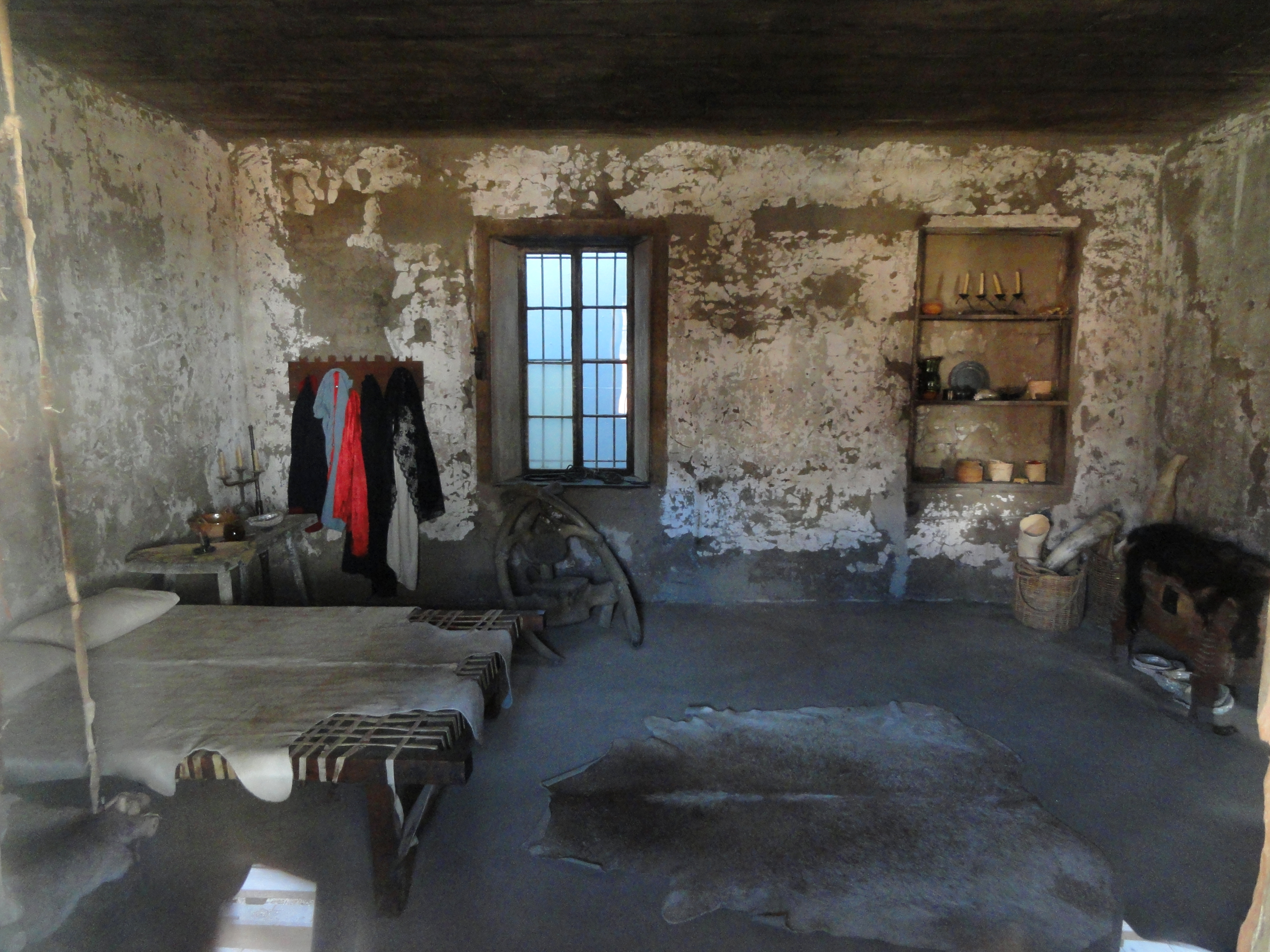
Inside

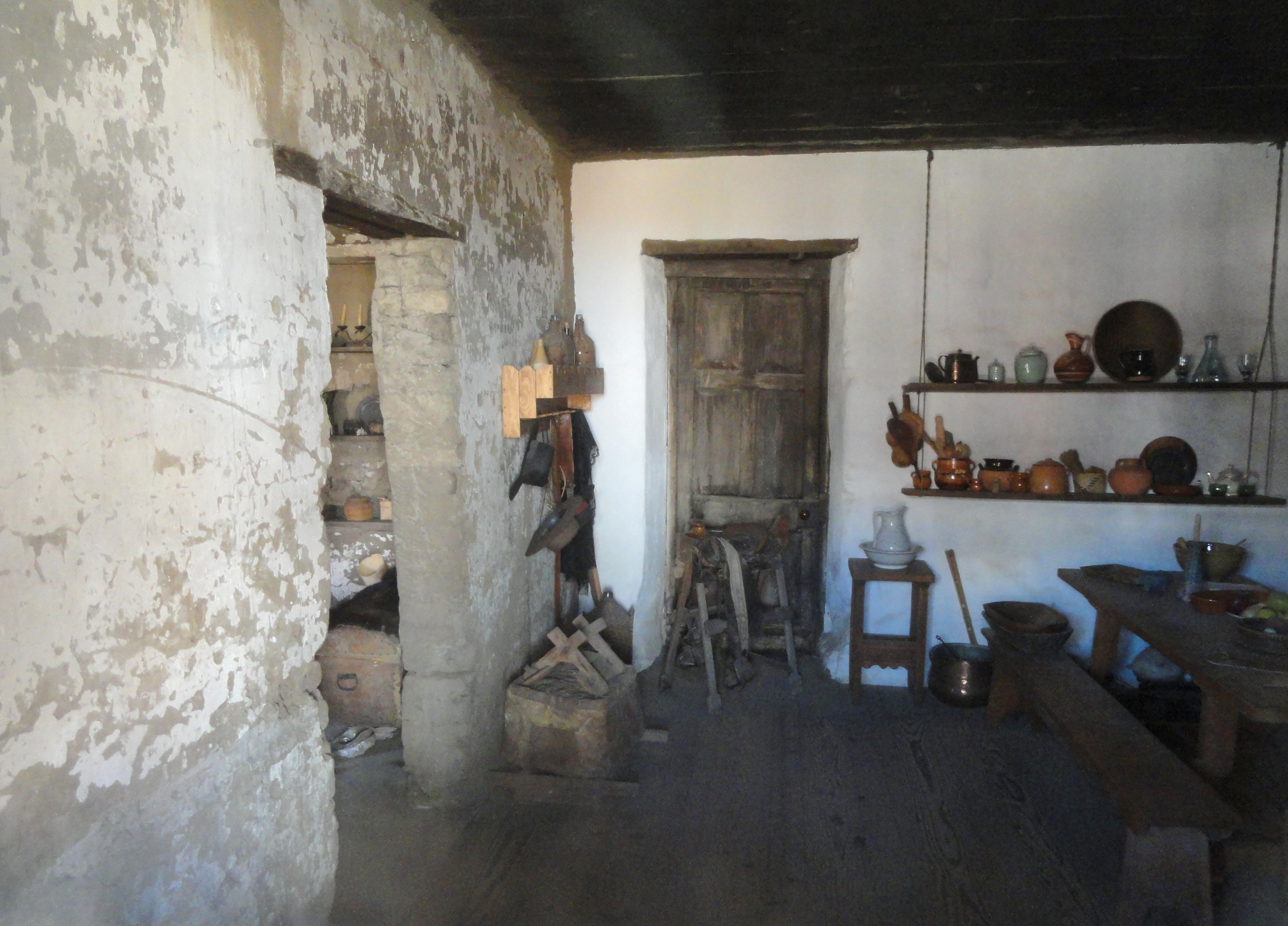
Inside

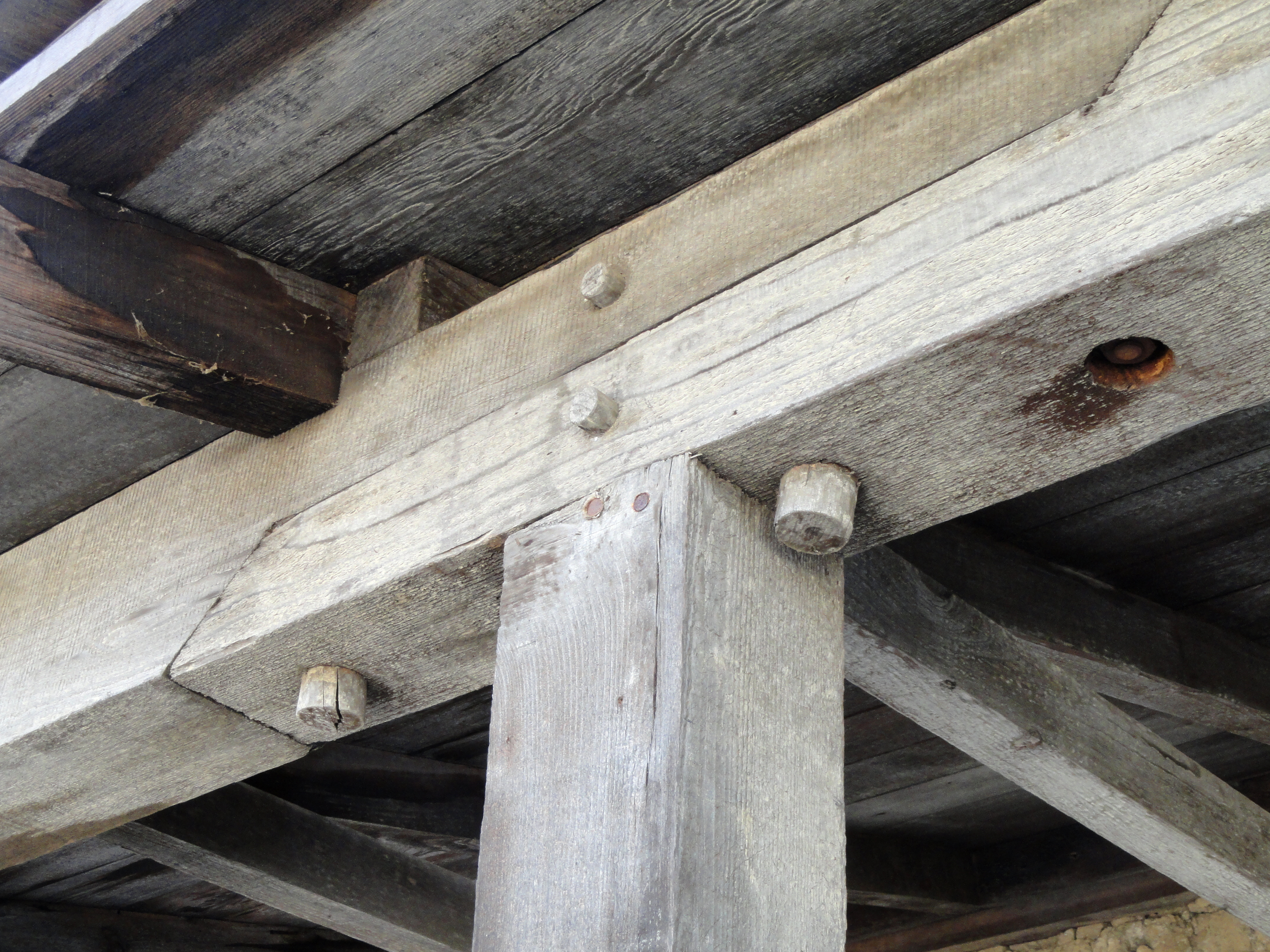
Woodwork inside

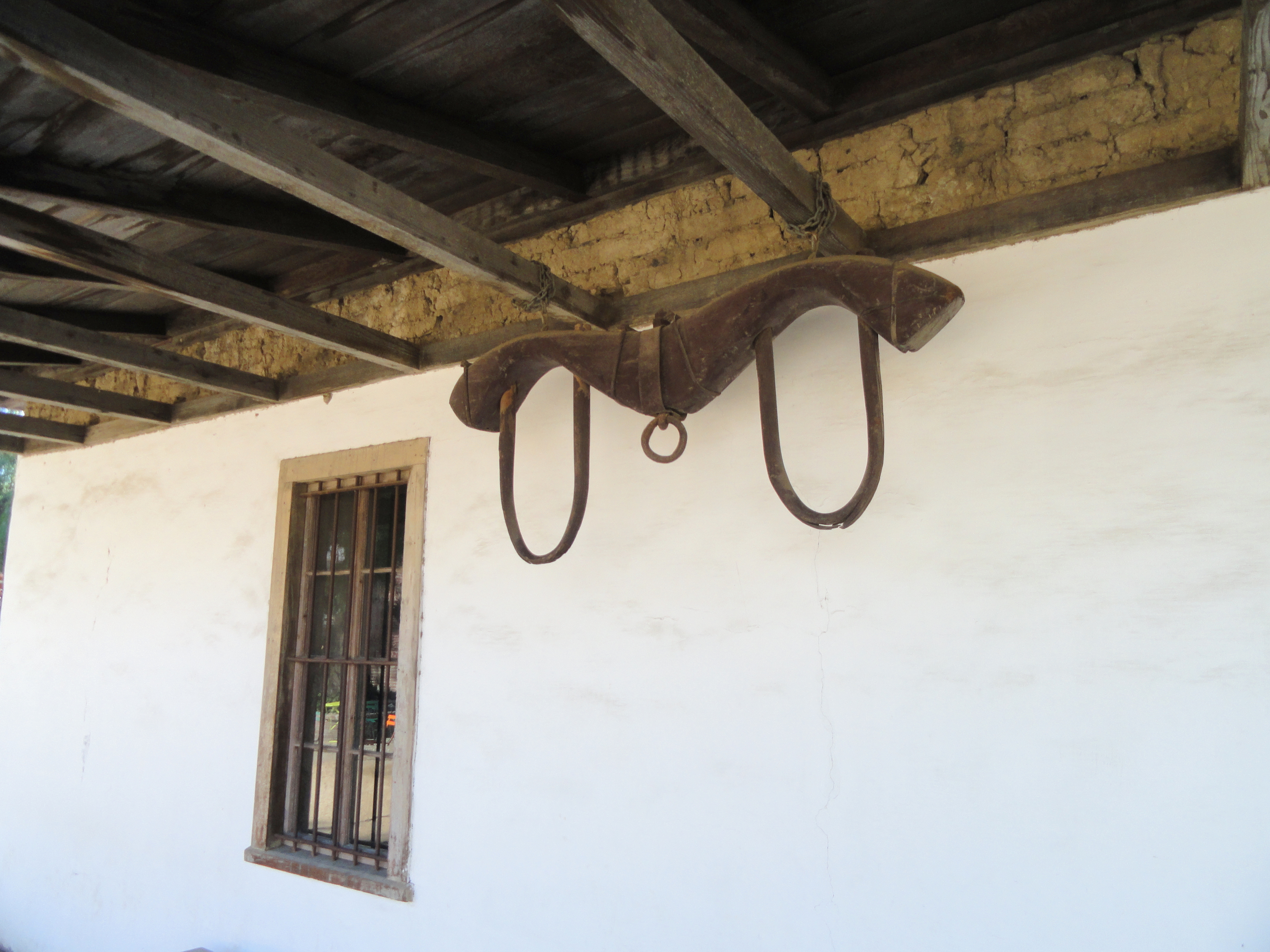
Historical artefacts

== Museum ==
The Peralta Adobe is a historic house museum, available for tours by appointment. The building covers an area of 20 feet by 41 feet (6 x 12.4 m), and has two connecting rooms of approximately equal size. The walls are about 2 feet (61 cm) thick, and made of adobe blocks that are 22 inches by 11 inches by 4 inches (56 x 28 x 10 cm). The adobe is furnished inside as it would have been 200 years ago. Outside is an outdoor fireplace oven (horno).

The adobe and the Thomas and Carmel Fallon House across the street from it are within The Peralta Adobe & Fallon House Historic Site, on San Pedro Square in downtown San Jose, operated by the local nonprofit History San José. The Fallon House was built in 1855 in the Victorian style.

== Related pages ==
- Juan Bautista de Anza National Historic Trail
- Luis María Peralta
