= Downtown San Jose =

- Central business district
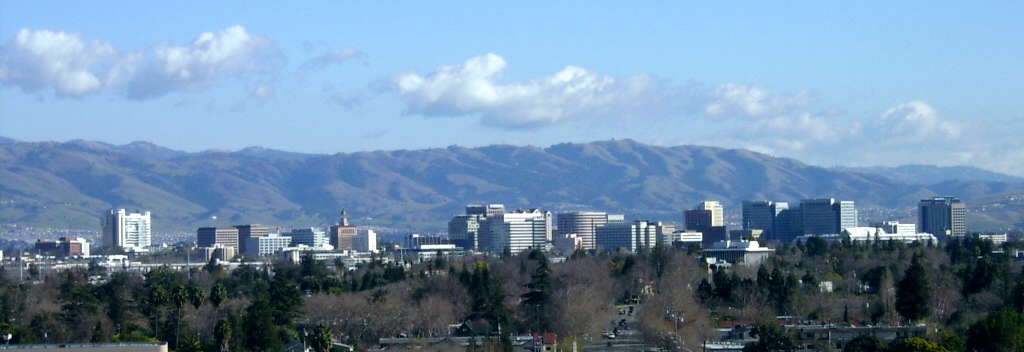
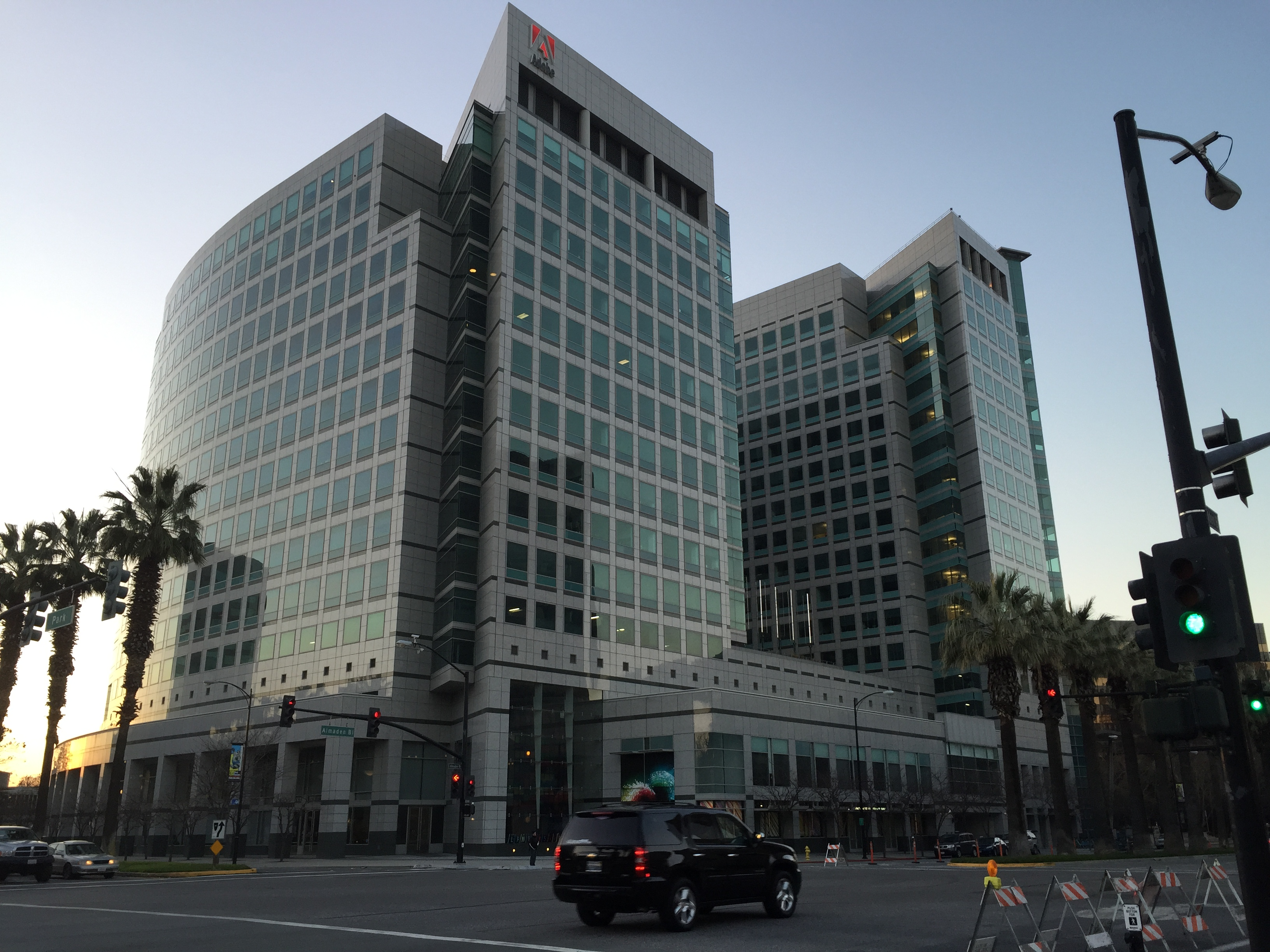
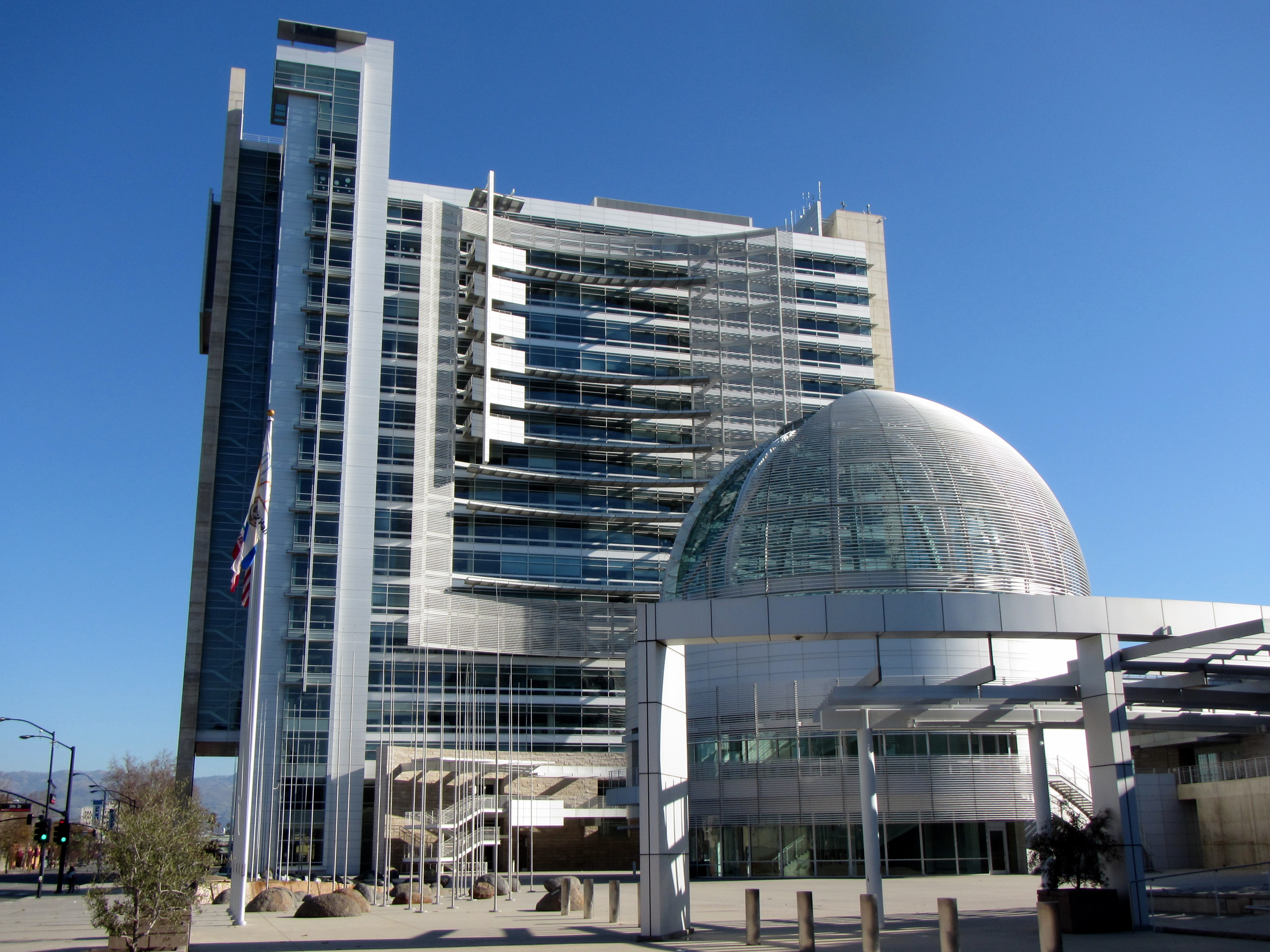
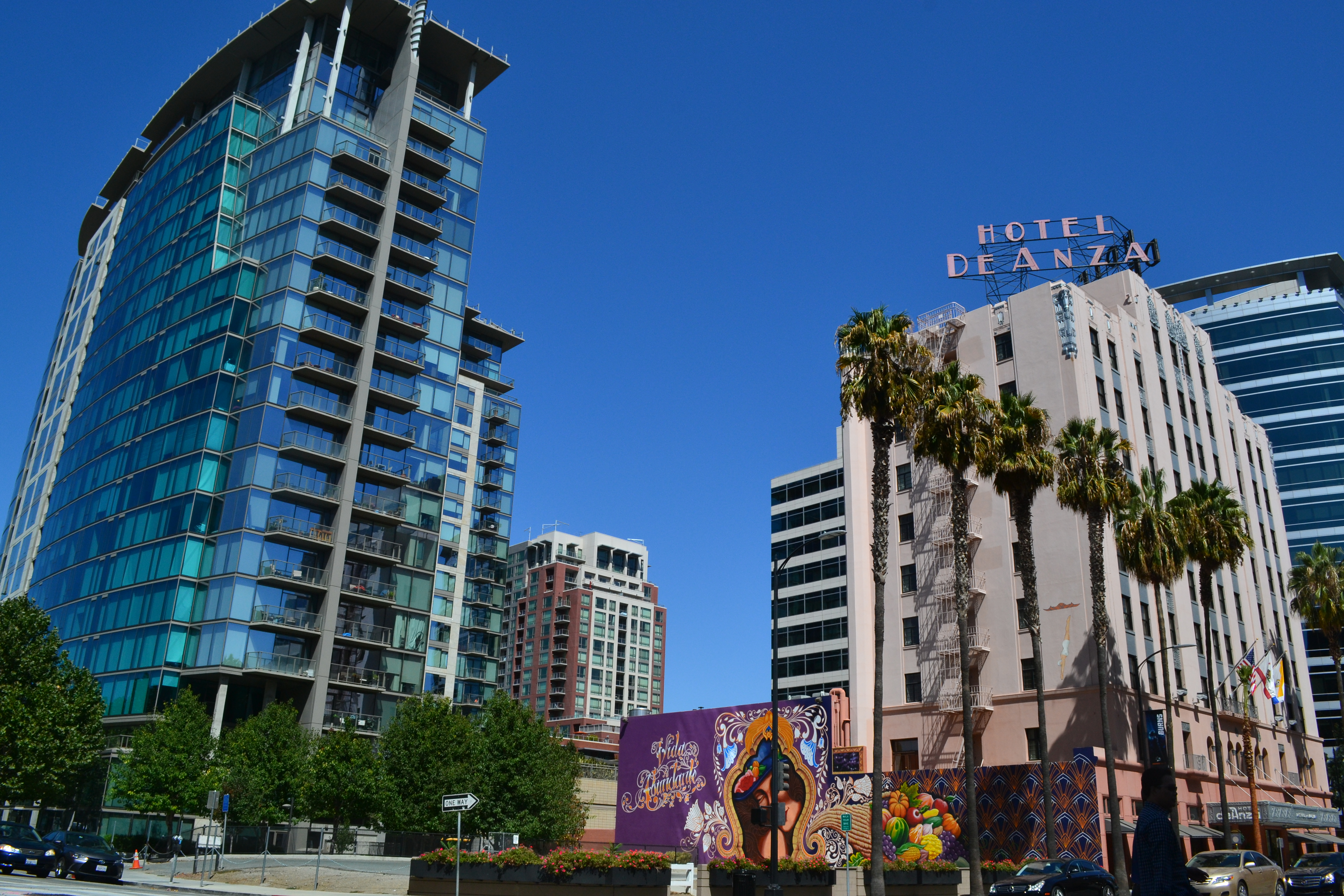
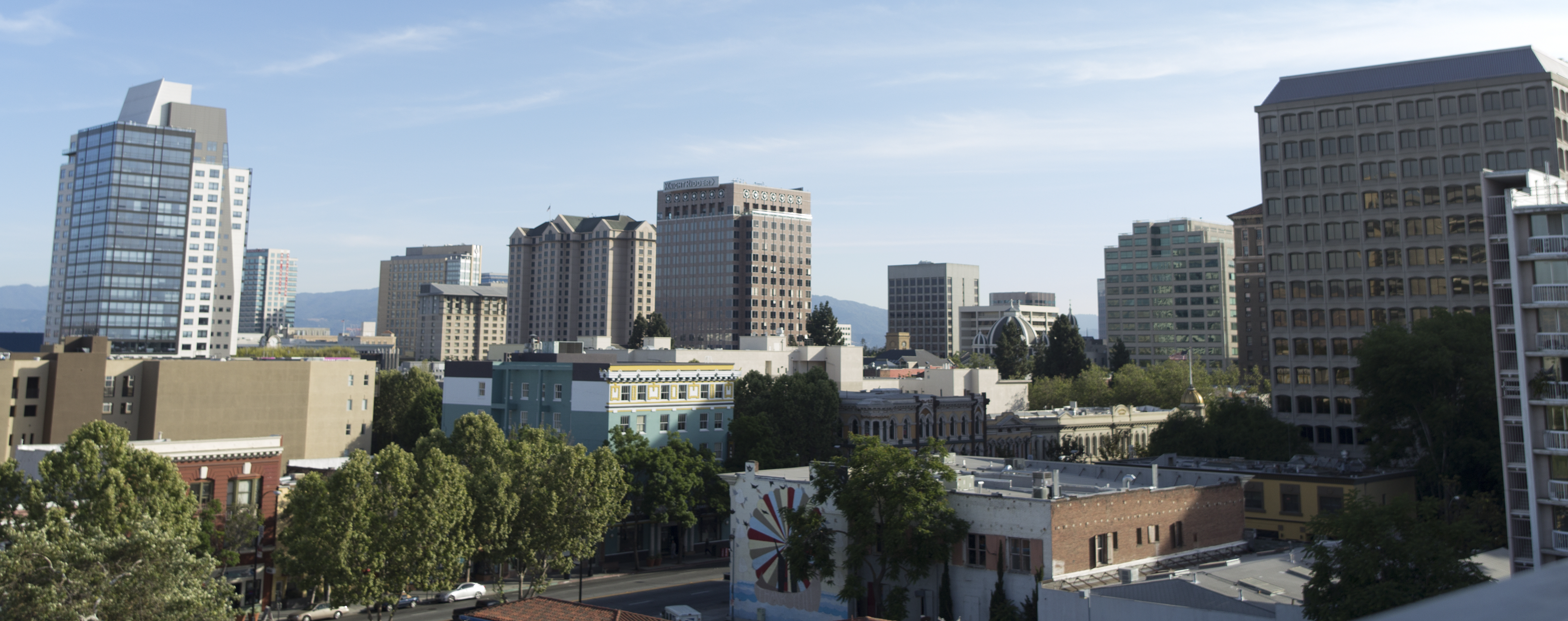
- Clockwise from top: Downtown skyline from the West; San José City Hall, Hotel De Anza & Almaden Boulevard, Downtown skyline from the North, Adobe World Headquarters

- Location within San Jose
- Coordinates: 37.332°N 121.89°W
- Country: United States
- State: California
- City: San Jose
- ZIP Code: 95110, 95112, 95113
- Website: https://sjdowntown.com/

Downtown San Jose is the central business district of San Jose, California, United States. Downtown is one of the largest tech clusters in Silicon Valley, as well as the cultural and political center of San Jose.

== History ==
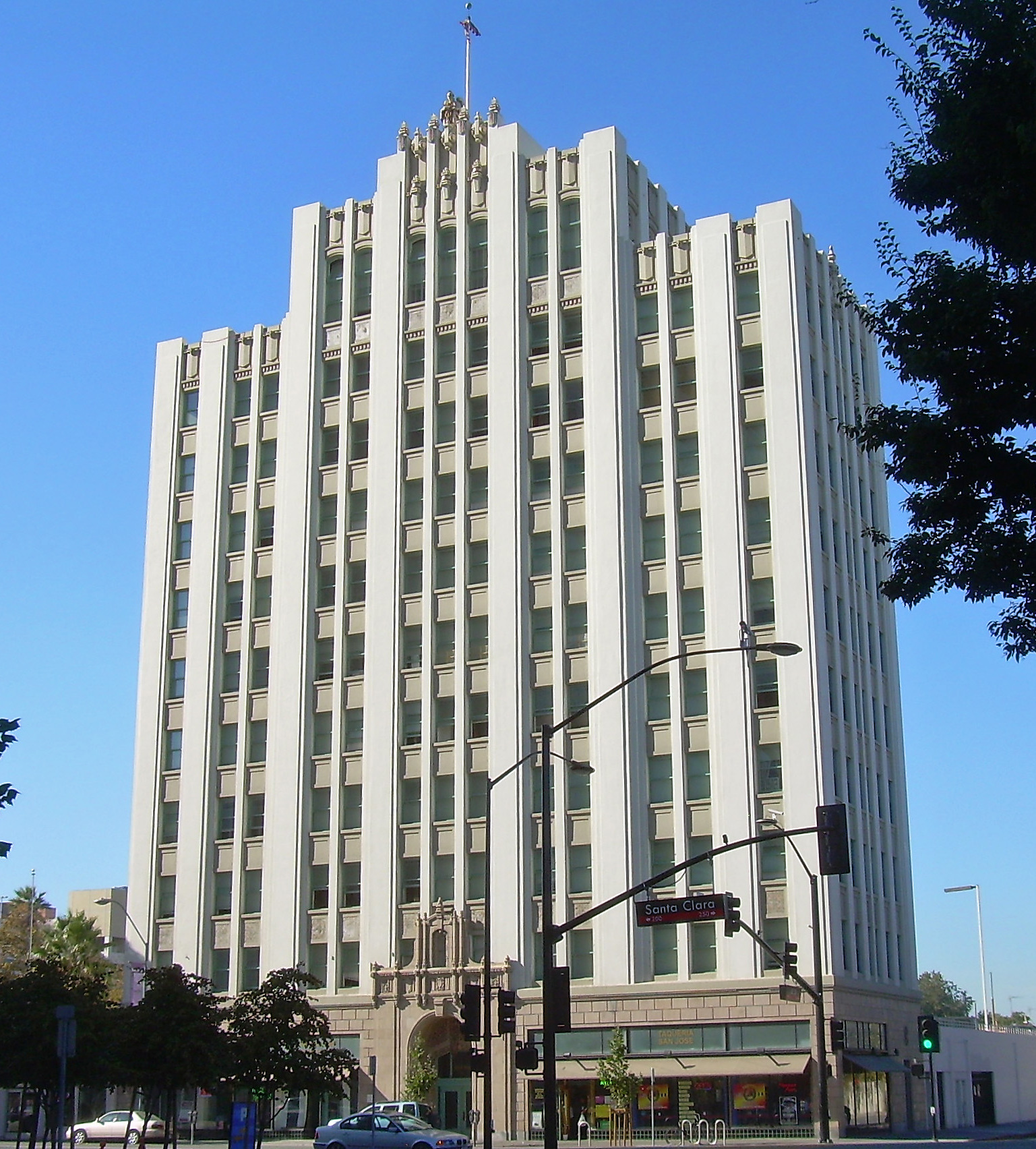
The Art Deco Medico-Dental Building was built in 1928.

The town was first settled in 1777. The area that now makes up downtown was first settled twenty years later, when the town of San Jose moved somewhat inland from its original location on the banks of the Guadalupe River. In 1850, San Jose incorporated to become California's first city and the location of California's first state capitol.

It was the location of the Hotel Vendome from 1889 until 1930, a grand Queen Anne Victorian hotel.

Despite widespread destruction caused by the 1906 San Francisco earthquake, a number of neighborhoods around Downtown San Jose still retain their original, pre-1906 housing stock. These neighborhoods include the South University, Naglee Park, Hensley Historic District, Reed Historic District and Vendome neighborhoods.

=== Contemporary era ===
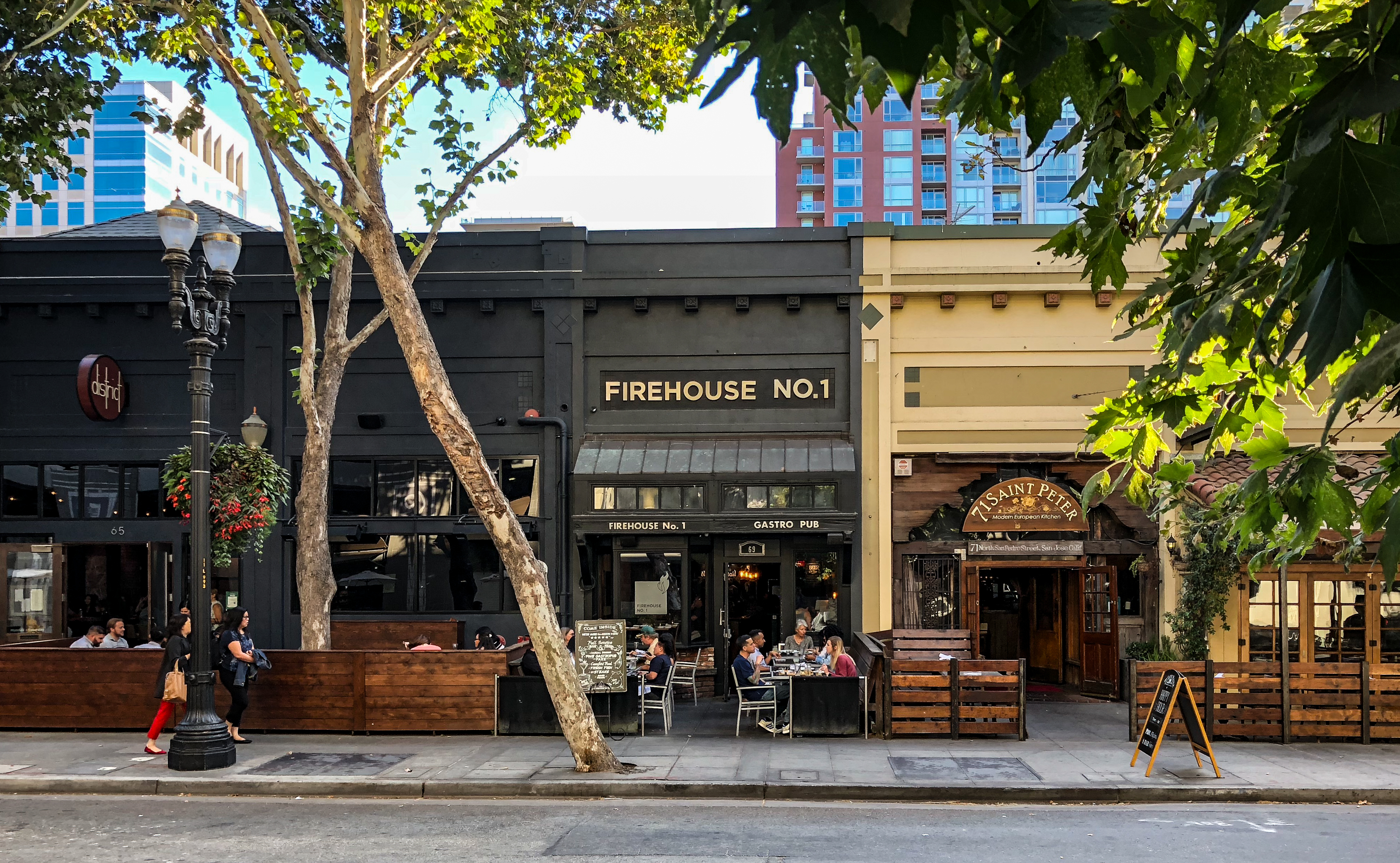
San Pedro Square is a popular dining destination and one of Downtown's oldest neighborhoods.

The downtown area was typical of a small, agriculture-based city of under 100,000 residents until city manager A. P. Hamann spearheaded aggressive expansion during the 1950s and '60s. As the city rapidly expanded into outlying areas, the downtown area entered a period of decline. In the 1980s, mayor Tom McEnery, whose family owned several buildings in downtown, initiated significant gentrification in the area.

The San Jose Redevelopment Agency, the largest such group in the state, would eventually become a key player in revitalizing the downtown area and, to a lesser extent, surrounding neighborhoods. In some cases, historic downtown buildings were bulldozed in order to make room for new hotels, office space, condominiums, museums, theaters and parks; to widen or re-align streets, and to build parking lots and garages.

As part of its apparent effort to stimulate economic growth and increase tax revenue within the downtown community, the San Jose Redevelopment Agency began encouraging builders to construct high-rise residential towers, and the agency offered subsidies and lifted the requirement to provide affordable units that were characteristic of other redevelopment projects throughout the city. The agency's master plan has incorporated high-rise condominiums since 1980. In 2008, the city's first high-rise project began selling units. Construction or planning has begun on at least seven additional high-rise projects. The agency states the high-rises will contribute to the creation of a more vibrant and well-to-do downtown culture. Due to the close proximity to San Jose Mineta International Airport, the high-rises are height limited. This limit varies depending on the precise location within downtown.

== Culture ==
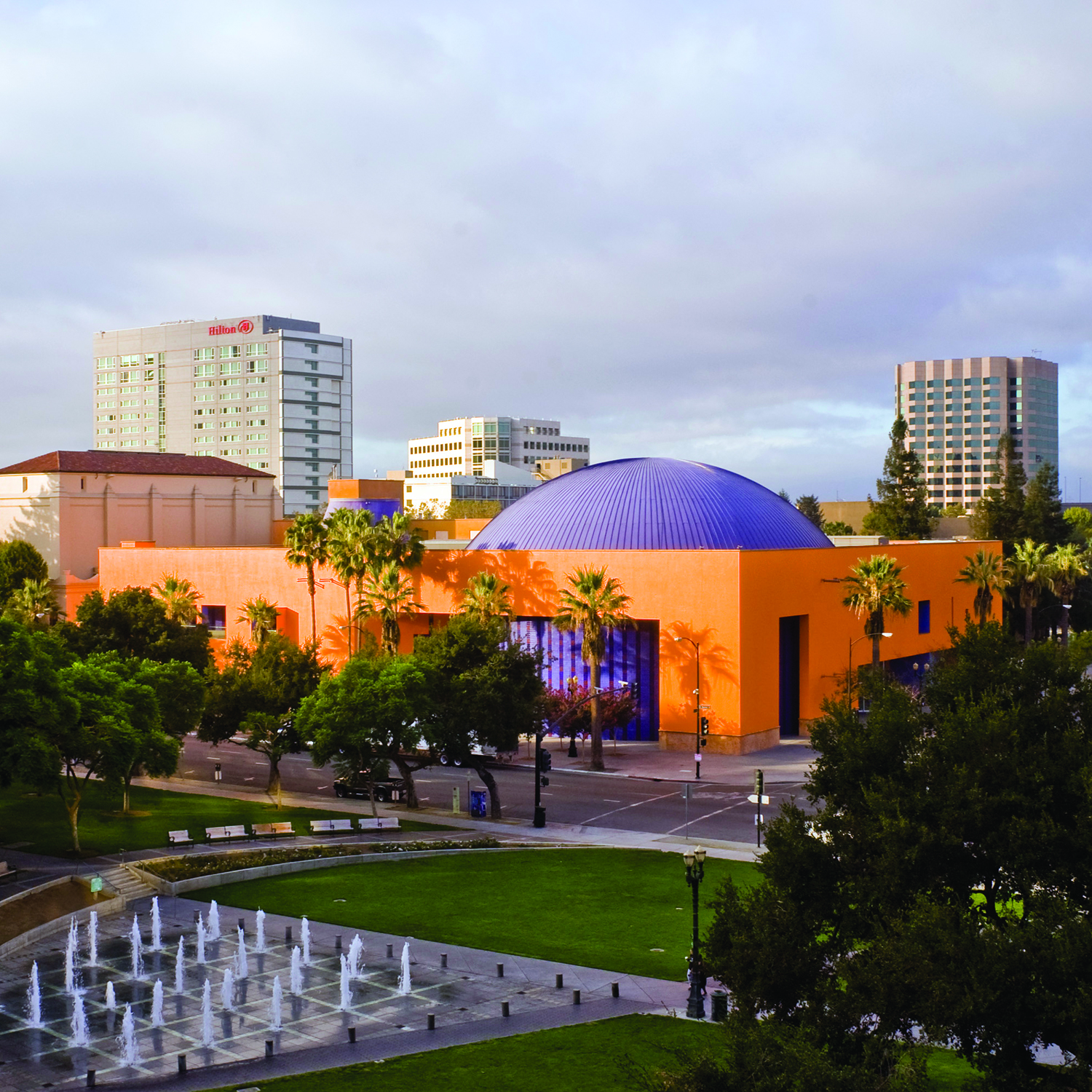
The Tech Interactive is dedicated to introducing the innovation spirit of Silicon Valley to the public.

Many of the 19th century buildings in central downtown appear on the National Register of Historic Places, in particular the area surrounding St. James Park, such as Trinity Episcopal Cathedral.

Downtown San Jose's early 20th century housing is diverse and includes many smaller Victorian homes along with a few fairly large gingerbread or Italianate-style Victorians, Craftsman, Mission and California Bungalow architecture in the neighborhoods surrounding the downtown core.

Downtown is home to many of the city's landmarks, including the San Jose Museum of Art, the Children's Discovery Museum of San Jose, The Tech Interactive, the San Jose Museum of Quilts & Textiles, the San Jose Repertory Theatre, the San Jose Stage Company, the historic De Anza Hotel, the Fairmont Hotel, the Cathedral Basilica of St. Joseph, the campus of San Jose State University and the Dr. Martin Luther King Jr. Library. The SAP Center, just west of Guadalupe Parkway, is also normally considered to be part of the downtown community.

== Economy ==
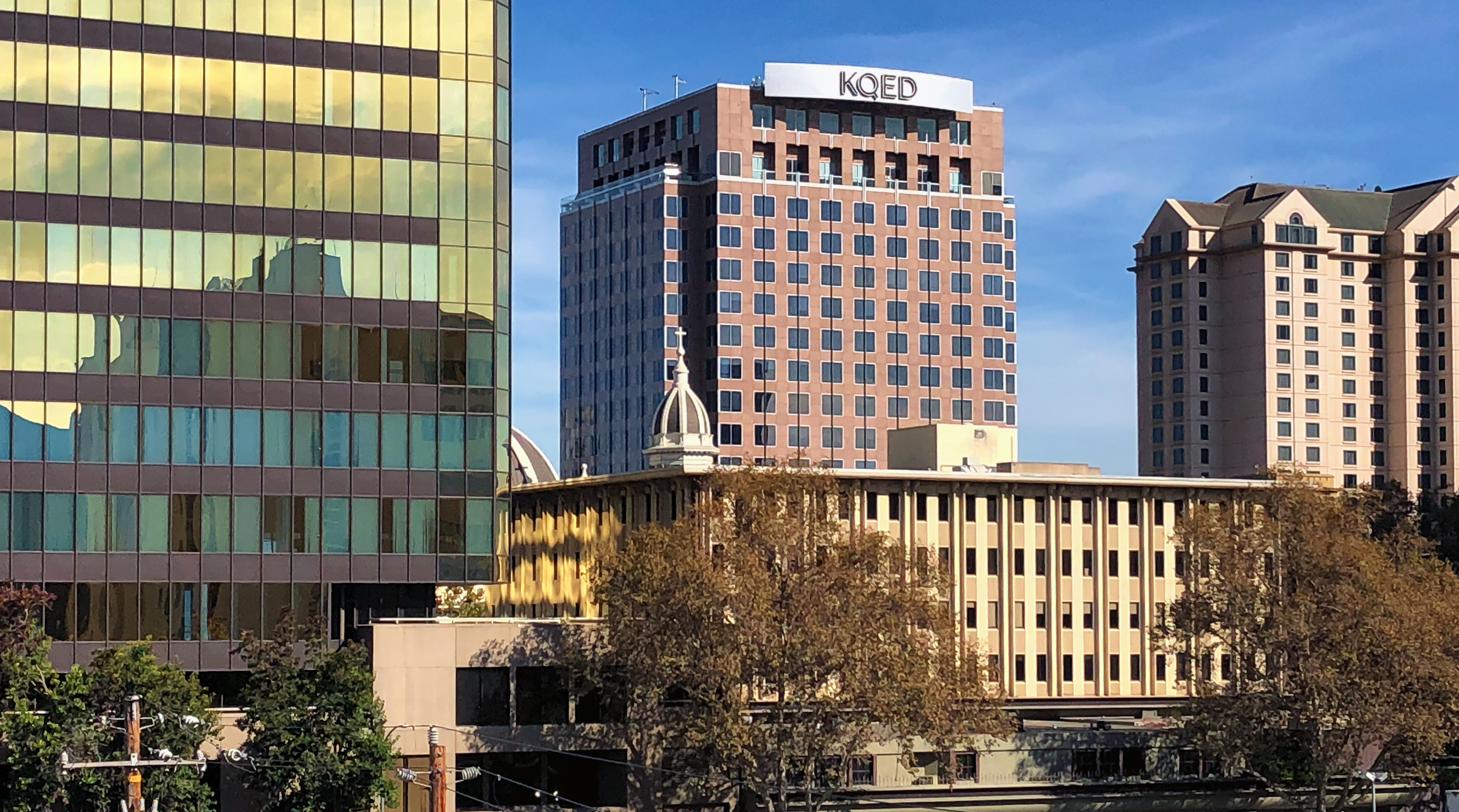
View of the former KQED Building

Downtown San Jose is a major tech cluster of Silicon Valley. It is home to Adobe World Headquarters, Zoom HQ, BEA Systems HQ, and numerous facilities and offices of major tech companies, including Amazon Lab126 and Google. The San Francisco Bay Area's largest news organization, The Mercury News, is headquartered on St. James Park. Downtown San Jose has a large concentration of hotels and hospitality services in San Jose, including The Westin San Jose, the Hilton San Jose, Marriott San Jose, Sheraton San Jose, largely concentrated near the San Jose Convention Center.

In February 2018, San Jose's city council approved a stage of a sale of downtown property to Google for $67 million. However, in April 2023, it was reported that Google paused on its West San Jose construction projects due to an economic slowdown.

Downtown also is home to several important network service providers and Internet service providers, many of them located in Market Post Tower. Although the cost of office and technical space is relatively high downtown, this is offset by the low cost of peering and internetworking, an effect of proximity to other networking companies.

Many of the public areas of downtown San Jose are covered by a public, free, Wi-Fi network, including the areas surrounding Plaza de César Chávez and San Pedro Square. Downtown is also the hub of the VTA light rail system, and the home of the main campus of San Jose State University.

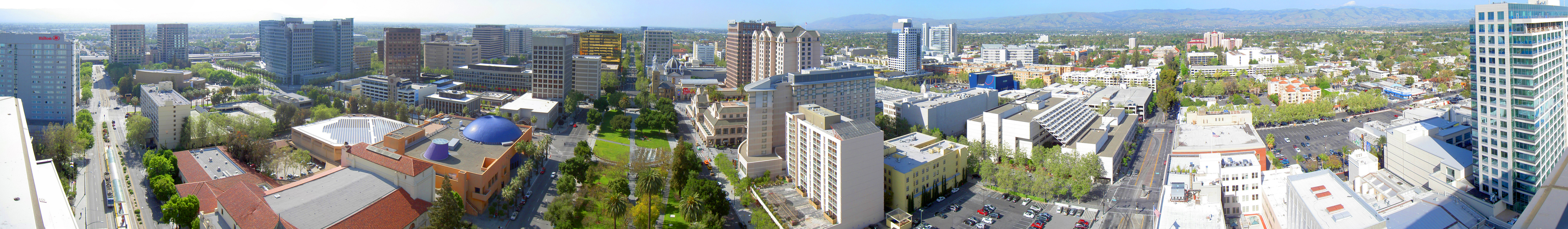
A panoramic view of Downtown. Plaza de César Chávez is in the center.

== Education ==
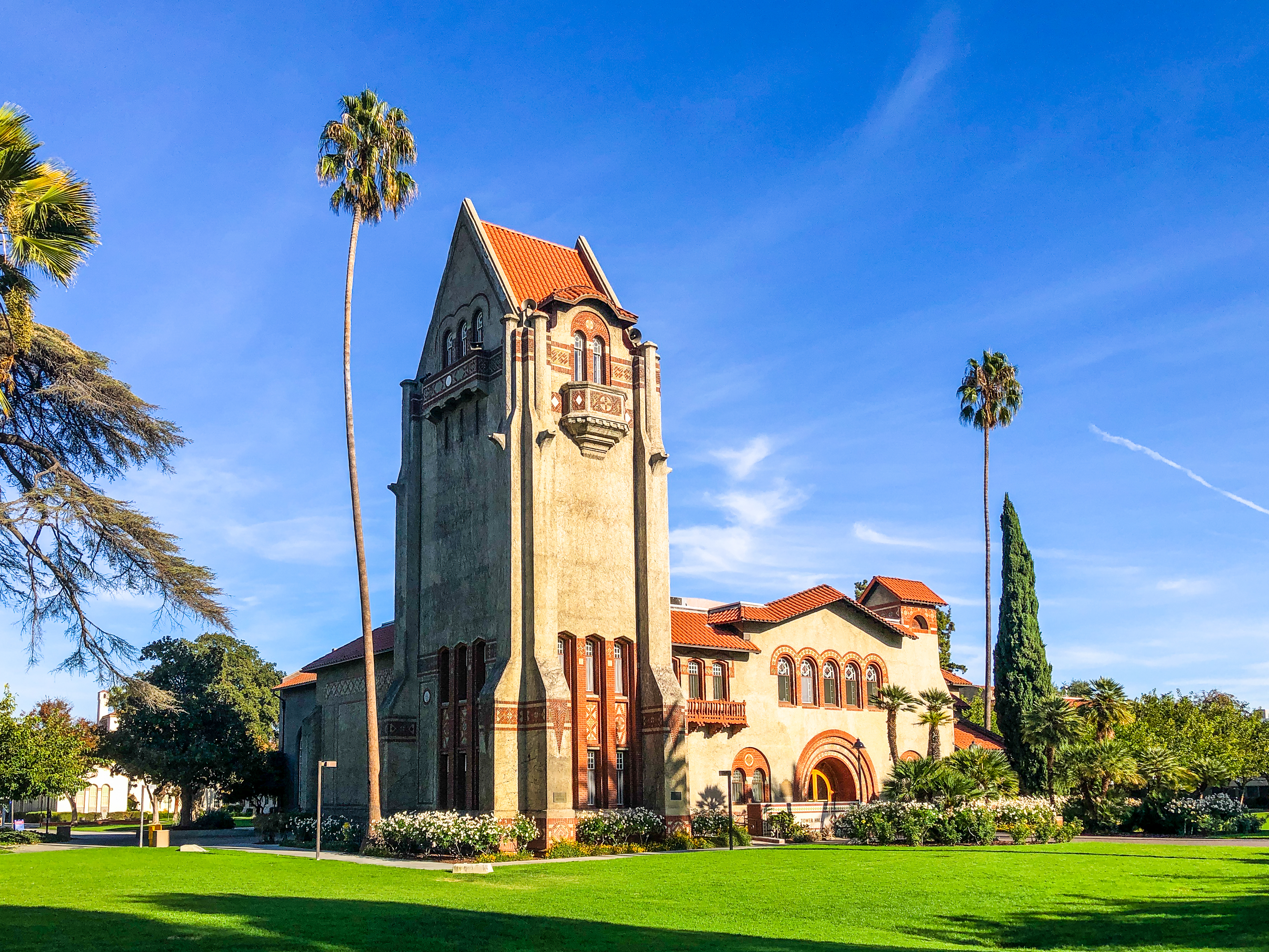
Tower Hall at San Jose State University, the West Coast's oldest public university.

Downtown San Jose is home to the campus of San José State University. SJSU is the founding campus of the California State University system and the oldest public university on the west coast of the United States. SJSU enrolls approximately 33,000 students.

The Dr. Martin Luther King, Jr. Library, shared by the city of San Jose and San Jose State University, is located on the campus of San Jose State University in downtown San Jose. The King Library represents the first collaboration of its kind between a university and a major U.S. city, and has won numerous awards including the Library Journal's prestigious 2004 Library of the Year award, the publication's highest honor. The library first opened its doors in 2003.
