= San Jose Fountain Blues & Brews Festival =

Music & beer festival in California, US

San Jose Fountain Blues & Brews Festival (sometimes styled Fountain Blues & Brews) is an annual two‑day music and beer festival held in downtown San Jose, California, typically at Plaza de César Chávez. It features live blues and blues‑adjacent music, craft beverages, food trucks, artisan vendors, family activities, and community engagement.

== History ==
The festival traces its roots to 1981, when it was founded by Ted Gehrke in partnership with San Jose State University’s Associated Students Program Board, making it the longest‑running blues festival on the West coast. Over decades, the event was shaped by Blues Foundation leadership—among them board president Suzanne St. John‑Crane and marketing director Dan Orloff—who kept the festival thriving and expanding its reach.

In 2025, the festival celebrated its 42nd edition, held over two days on June 14–15 at Plaza de César Chávez in San Jose.

Recognized as "Best Festival in Silicon Valley" in 2024, the event had recently moved toward a broader musical scope that included what organizers describe as "blues‑adjacent" genres, aiming to attract new audiences while preserving blues heritage. The 2025 expansion to two days came after local mayoral and community support and fundraising efforts. As St. John‑Crane recalled, San Jose's mayor asked why the festival was not already two days; soon after, funding was secured to support the change.

== Format and programming ==
Festival programming typically runs from noon to 8 pm on each day across two stages, featuring headlining blues performers alongside emerging regional acts. The 2025 lineup included Christone “Kingfish” Ingram, Walter Trout, Kid Andersen's Greaseland All Stars, Vanessa Collier, Aki Kumar, Alabama Mike, M’Sippi Slide, and Mike Zito among others. Secondary stages offer local talent, and family‑friendly amenities include an Instrument Petting Zoo and interactive games.

Alongside music, the festival features 20+ craft breweries, cider‑houses, and wineries, paired with Southern‑inspired and local cuisine from area food trucks. Tickets in 2025 were offered at approximately $31.50 for one day and $51.50 for both days.

== Organization and mission ==
The festival is produced by the Fountain Blues Foundation, a 501(c)(3) nonprofit organization established to sustain and broaden the festival's reach. The foundation maintains ongoing support from the City of San Jose's Cultural Affairs grant, the San Jose Downtown Association, and collaborating music societies. The Fountain Blues Foundation aims to preserve and promote the heritage of the blues and its roots in American music. To attract diverse audiences, the festival often includes related genres such as soul, funk, gospel, zydeco, R&B, and Americana alongside traditional blues.

== Attendance and impact ==
Over its four-decade history, the festival has attracted thousands of people from the South Bay region and beyond. Typically attended by 3,000–5,000 patrons over two days, it remains affordable and community-driven, with ticket prices ranging from around $30 to $70 for general admission and up to $140 for VIP passes.

== Other notable events ==
Fountain Blues & Brews is joined by several other popular recurring events in Plaza de César Chávez:

Music in the Park (San Jose)

San Jose Jazz Festival

Christmas in the Park
