= Needle to the Groove =

Needle to the Groove may refer to:

- Needle to the Groove (record label), US independent record label and shops
- A track of the same name on The Album by Mantronix
