= Music in the Park =

Annual summer concert in California

Music in the Park is an annual summer concert series held at Plaza de César Chávez in downtown San Jose, California. Presented by Music In The Park Ltd in collaboration with the San Jose Downtown Association and Metro Silicon Valley, it features performances by popular national and local artists, drawing large crowds throughout the season.

== History ==
The concert series was established in 1989 (sometimes cited as 1988) as a free public event intended to revitalize downtown San Jose. Metro Silicon Valley and the Downtown Association (co‑founded by Dan Pulcrano and Ray Rodriguez) helped launch the series to bring people back to urban core.

For its first two decades, Music in the Park was free; over time, concerns over safety and costs led organizers to shift to ticketed admission in the early 2010s. The series paused in 2011 and 2012 due to security issues and re‑emerged in 2013 as a paid event.. The return in 2013 was restructured with fencing, admission fees, and enhanced security measures.

== Featured performers ==
Performers at Music In The Park have included notable national and local artists, including: The Psychedelic Furs, Blue Öyster Cult, Smash Mouth, The Beach Boys, Jesse Colin Young, Tower of Power, Third Eye Blind, El Tri, Maroon 5, Jefferson Starship, A Flock of Seagulls, and Los Lobos.

== Other notable events ==
Music In The Park is joined by several other popular recurring events in Plaza de César Chávez:

San Jose Jazz Festival - founded in 1990

Christmas in The Park - first featured in Plaza de César Chávez in 1980

San Jose Fountain Blues & Brews Festival - the longest-running blues festival on the West coast, founded in 1981
