= Christmas in the Park =

Christmas in the Park may refer to:

- Christmas in the Park (New Zealand)
- Christmas in the Park (San Jose)
- Christmas in the Park (Six Flags México)
