= Needle to the Groove (record label) =

US independent record label and shop

Needle to the Groove (NTTG) is an American independent record label and two physical record shops, based in the San Francisco Bay Area, California. Its wider operations include event curation in the greater Bay Area.

== History ==
Needle to the Groove began as a store in the Niles District in Fremont, California, founded by Dan Bernal. Its second location, founded by Allen Johnson at a storefront on East Santa Clara Street in San Jose, California, relocated to a larger 2,000-square-foot space at 424 E. Santa Clara St. in 2018. The shop marked its 10th anniversary in San Jose in 2024 with an event at Still O.G. Hi-Fi Vinyl Bar. It is also one of the few black-owned record stores in the country. The label arm operates out of the San Jose location.

== Record Label ==
NTTG's label releases limited-edition music on vinyl, cassette, and digital formats, often in small runs (100–500 copies). The label has also collaborated on events like record swaps, curated festival stages,and organized release parties across the San Francisco Bay Area. The label is run by music journalist David Ma, with assistance from the aforementioned, as well as musician Jeff Brummett and DJ Michael "Basura" Boado, who also manages the San Jose location.

== Artists ==
The label features a mix of local Bay Area artists and broader acts. Key artists include:

- Prince Paul & Don Newkirk (By Every Means Necessary, Vol. 1, the musical score to the Netflix documentary film, Who Killed Malcolm X?)
- Valley Wolf (Modesto Latin rock; full-length debut produced by Eduardo Arenas of Chicano Batman).
- Fatboi Sharif (remastered debut Ape Twin DELUXE with exclusive tracks on vinyl).
- Will Sprott (former frontman of San Jose's The Mumlers, member of Shannon & The Clams; album Natural Internet).
- Casual + Albert Jenkinsl (Oakland collective Hieroglyphics, STARDUSTER EP).
- Aceyalone and MUMBLES ("Courage Under Fire" b/w "Freedom Now" 45 release due fall 2025).

== Connection to San Jose ==
Located in downtown San Jose (DTSJ), NTTG supports the local music scene by showcasing underrepresented artists from the region. Co-owner and general manager of NTTG Michael Boado is a partner at The Ritz nightclub, while David Ma teaches an "Introduction To Hip-Hop" course at San Jose State University's music department.

NTTG has been featured in local press, including Content Magazine and KQED, for its vinyl curation and community role. The San Jose Mercury News has profiled NTTG's role in San Jose's local music culture, specifically downtown San Jose. The shop hosts DJ sets and participates in civic collaborations like San Jose's Music in the Park (opening DJ sets for Toots and the Maytals and Brenton Wood), and community events at venues such as San Jose's Mexican Heritage Plaza and San Jose Jazz Festival. In 2023, it released its first unofficial Record Store Day record title and is an annual participant in Record Store Day.
