= Plaza de San José (California) =

Public plaza in San Jose, California

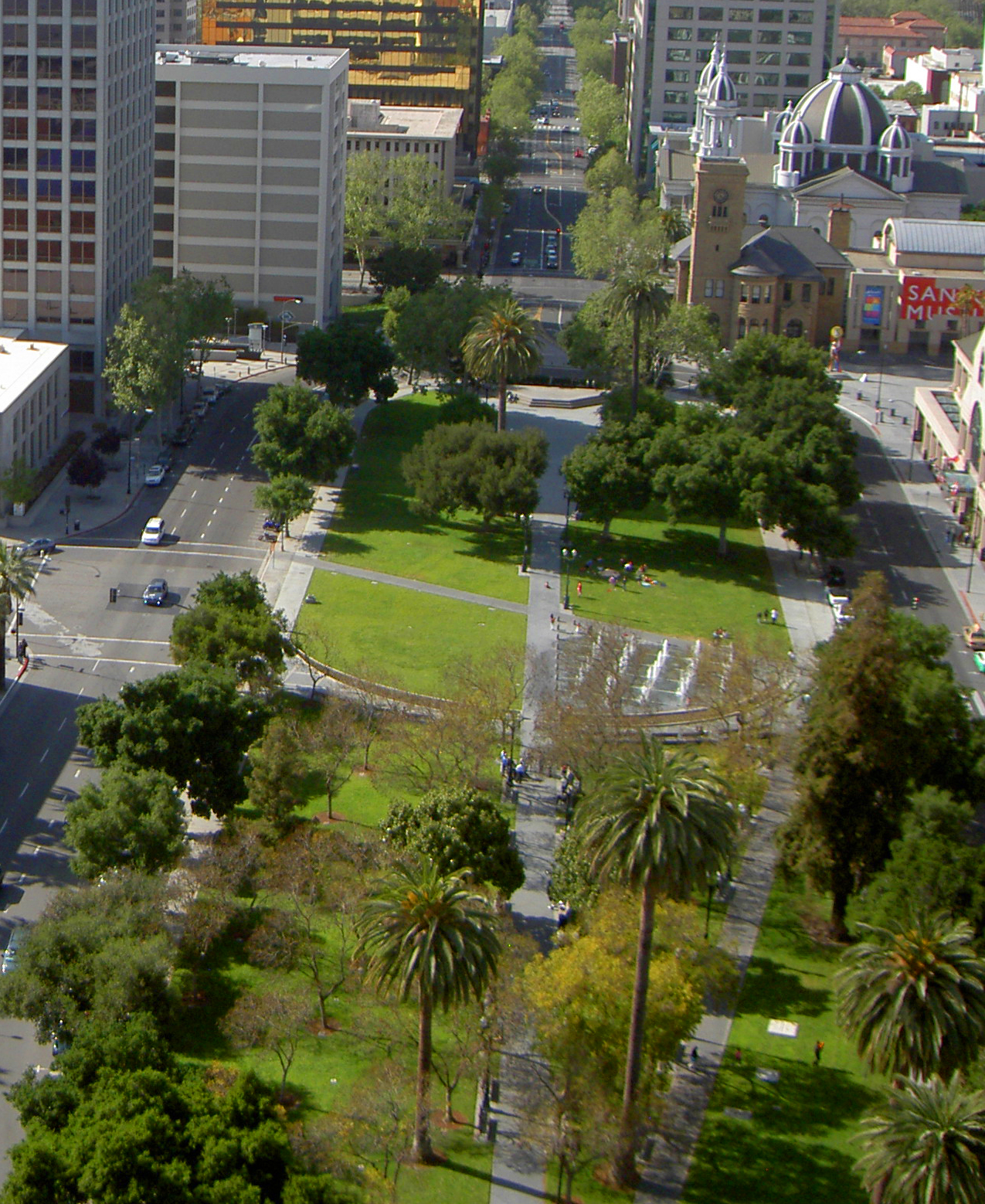
- The Plaza de San José with St. Joseph's Cathedral-Basilica in the background.

- Former names: Plaza del Pueblo; Plaza Mayor; Market Plaza; Plaza de César Chávez
- Area: 2.3 acres (0.93 ha)
- Location: San Jose, California
- Coordinates: 37.332°N 121.89°W

Construction
- Foundation: 1797

The Plaza de San José is an urban plaza and park in Downtown San Jose, California. The plaza was originally laid out by Spanish authorities in 1797, to serve as the plaza mayor of the Pueblo de San José de Guadalupe, making it the oldest public space in Northern California.

The Plaza de San José is one of San Jose's primary civic spaces and the historic center of Downtown San Jose. It is bounded by numerous San Jose institutions and landmarks, including The Tech Museum of Innovation, the San Jose Museum of Art, City National Civic, San Jose State University, and Circle of Palms Plaza. The plaza hosts numerous notable events, including the San Jose Jazz Festival, Music in the Park and Christmas in the Park.

== History ==
The Plaza was established when San Jose moved from its original location on the bank of the Guadalupe River to the current downtown location in 1797 and has been in use ever since, making it the oldest public open space in Northern California.

The present-day park was the site of California's capitol from 1849 to 1851, a period during which the California Republic gained American statehood; hence, the site contained California's first state capitol. From 1889 to 1958, San Jose's city hall occupied the center of the park before the local government moved it northward to North First and Mission Streets. Today, San Jose City Hall is located nearby on Santa Clara Street.

The Fairmont San Jose's main tower was built in 1987, while its annex tower was completed in 2002.

In 1993, the park was renamed Plaza de César E. Chávez in honor of Californian civil rights activist César Chávez following his death. In March 2026, Chavez's name was removed from a commemorative plaque in the park in response to recent sexual abuse allegations made against the plaza's namesake. The park was officially renamed "Plaza de San José" by the City Council on October 27, 2026, after a public naming process.

== Culture ==
At different times of the year it hosts live music, cultural festivals, arts and crafts fairs, food shows, the official city Christmas tree, water fountains, and open-air theater.

The San Jose Fountain Blues & Brews Festival is a two-day recurring event every summer. Founded in 1981, it is the longest-running blues festival on the West Coast.

The Music in the Park concert series has been held in the park since 1988, except during the 2020 pandemic and in 2011 and 2012, when security issues forced the organizer of the formerly free series to take a break and return as a ticketed event.

The San Jose Jazz Summer Fest has its main stage in the park.

Since 2015, Silicon Valley Pride has been held in the vicinity of the plaza, which had hosted the event in the 1980s as well.

Every winter from Thanksgiving until New Year's it hosts the Christmas in the Park.

At the south end of the plaza is the statue of Quetzalcóatl by Robert Graham.

In 2023, a group of San Jose civic leaders formed a Plaza Conservancy, a non-profit organization that intends to encourage public use of the park and enhance the experience for park visitors through restoration and stewardship.

== Gallery ==
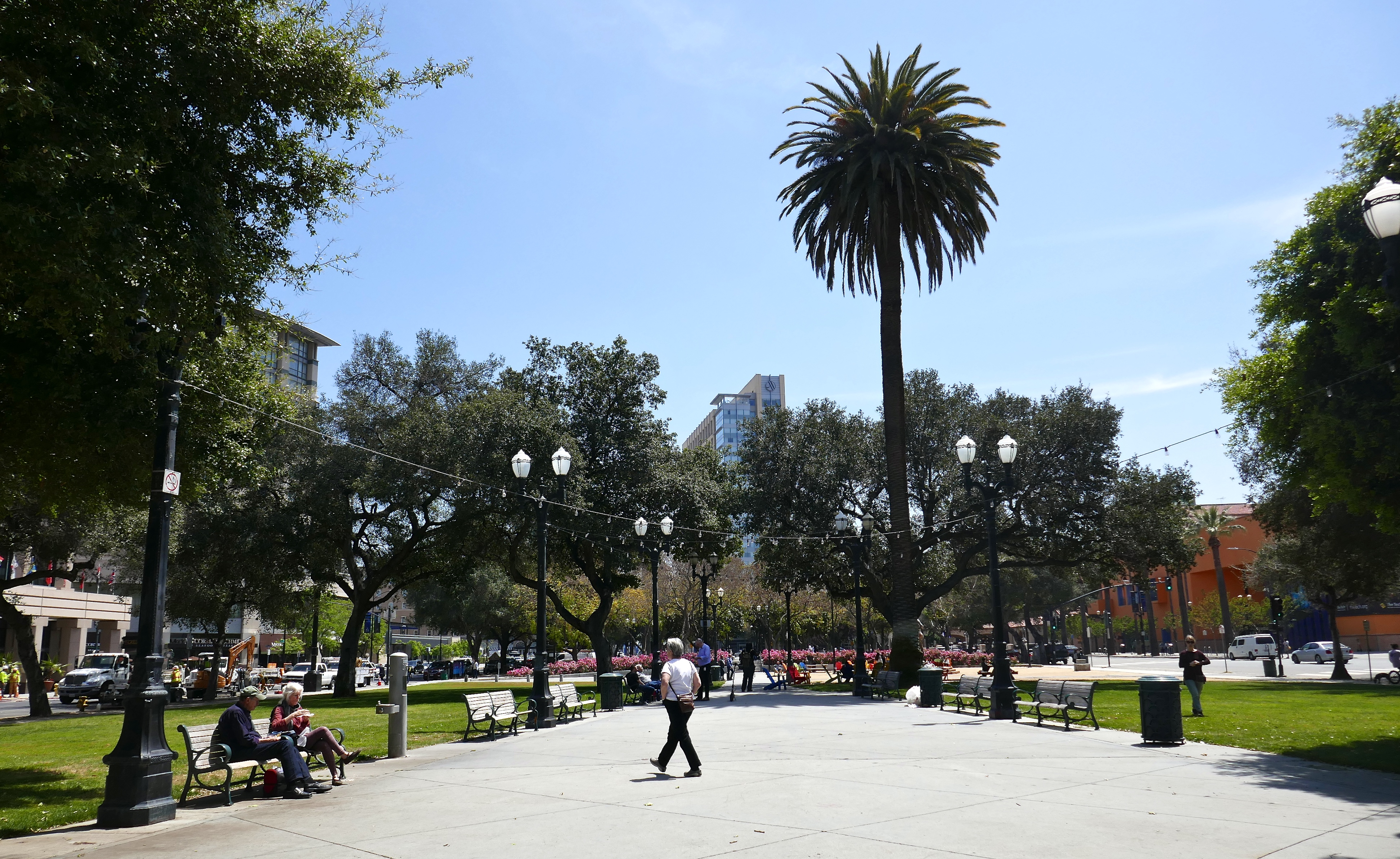
The central walkway in the plaza

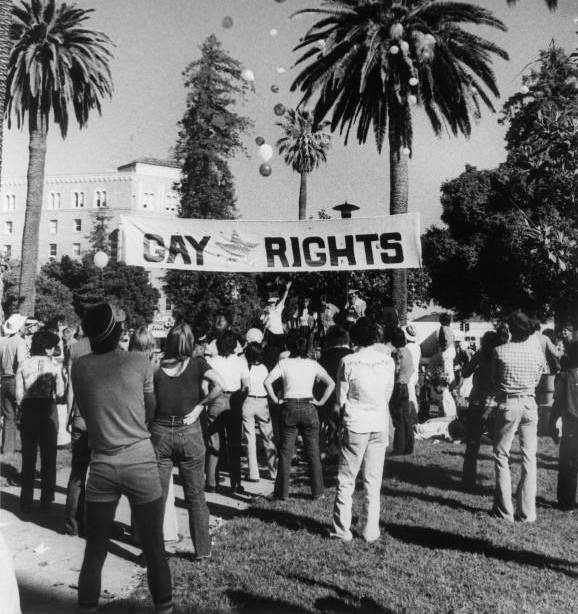
1980 Silicon Valley Pride
