= Silicon Valley Pride =

LGBTQ pride celebration in San Jose, California

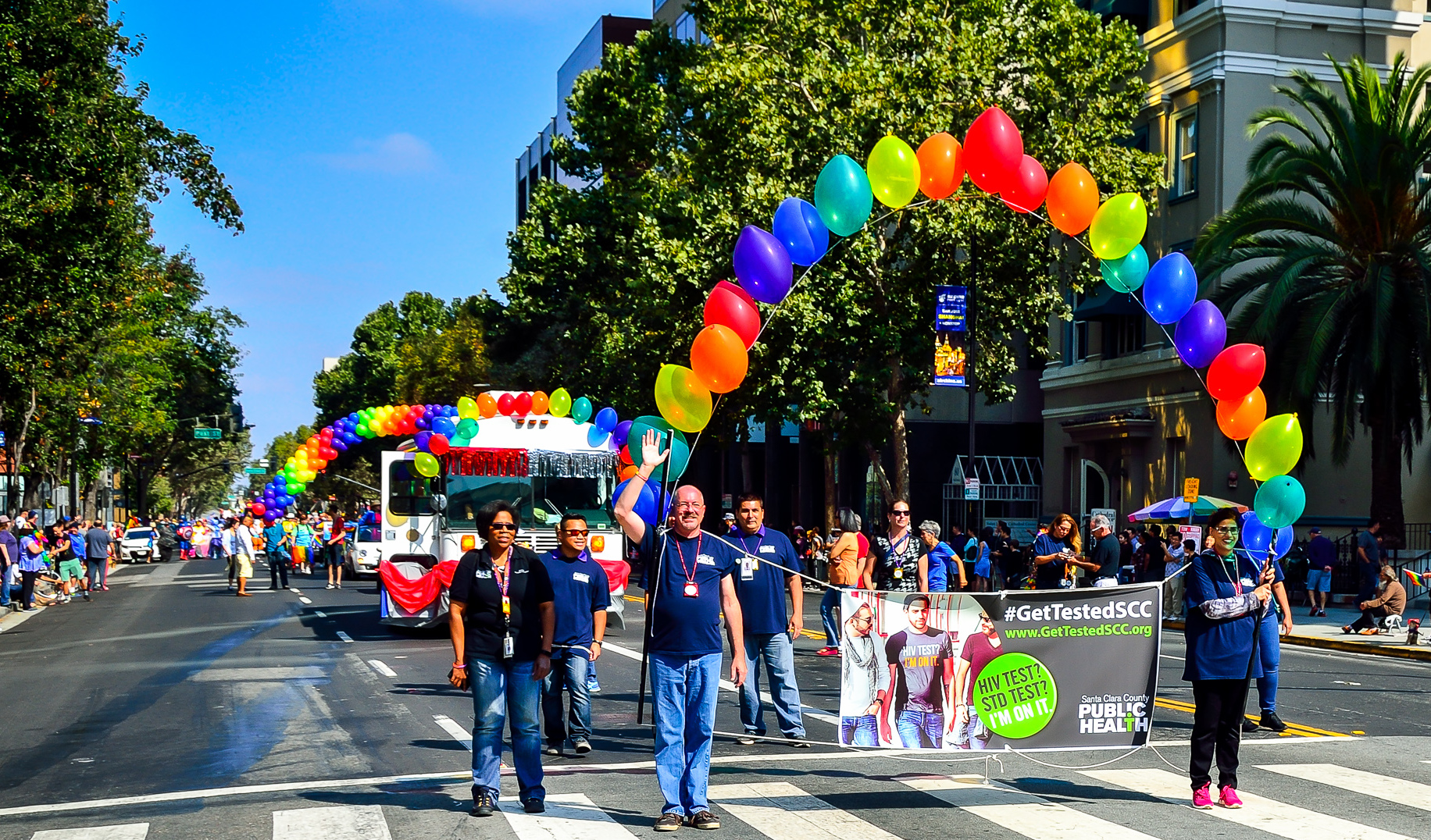
- Genre: Pride parade and festival
- Frequency: Last weekend in August
- Location: San Jose, California
- Inaugurated: 1975
- Organizer: Billy DeFrank Lesbian, Gay, Bisexual and Transgender Community Center
- Website: www.svpride.com

Silicon Valley Pride, also known as San Jose Pride, is an annual LGBT pride celebration in San Jose, California, the largest city in Silicon Valley. Founded in 1975, it is organized by the Gay Pride Celebration Committee of San Jose.

== History ==
San Jose Pride began as a gay rights rally in 1975 at San José State University. The following year, it evolved into the San Jose Gay Pride Festival, held at St. James Park from 1976 until 1985 (except for 1981 and 1982, when it was held at Plaza de César Chávez).

In 1986, San Jose Pride moved out of Downtown San Jose, to the SJSU Athletic Fields in Spartan Keyes. It was then based at the Santa Clara County Fairgrounds on Monterey Road from 1987 until 1993.

In 1993 and 1994, pride was held in The Alameda district, first on The Alameda and then on Stockton Ave. Many gay-owned businesses began to spring up in this quiet west-downtown neighborhood, creating one of the first gayborhoods in Silicon Valley.

In 1995, the Pride Parade and Festival was brought back to Downtown San Jose, to the Discovery Meadow, where it was held until 2014.

In 2014, San Jose Pride renamed itself to Silicon Valley Pride, to be more inclusive of San Jose's neighboring communities across the Silicon Valley region. The location of the festival has changed over the years, but it has always taken place within the city of San Jose.

Since 2015, pride has been held in the vicinity of Plaza de César Chávez.

== Gallery ==
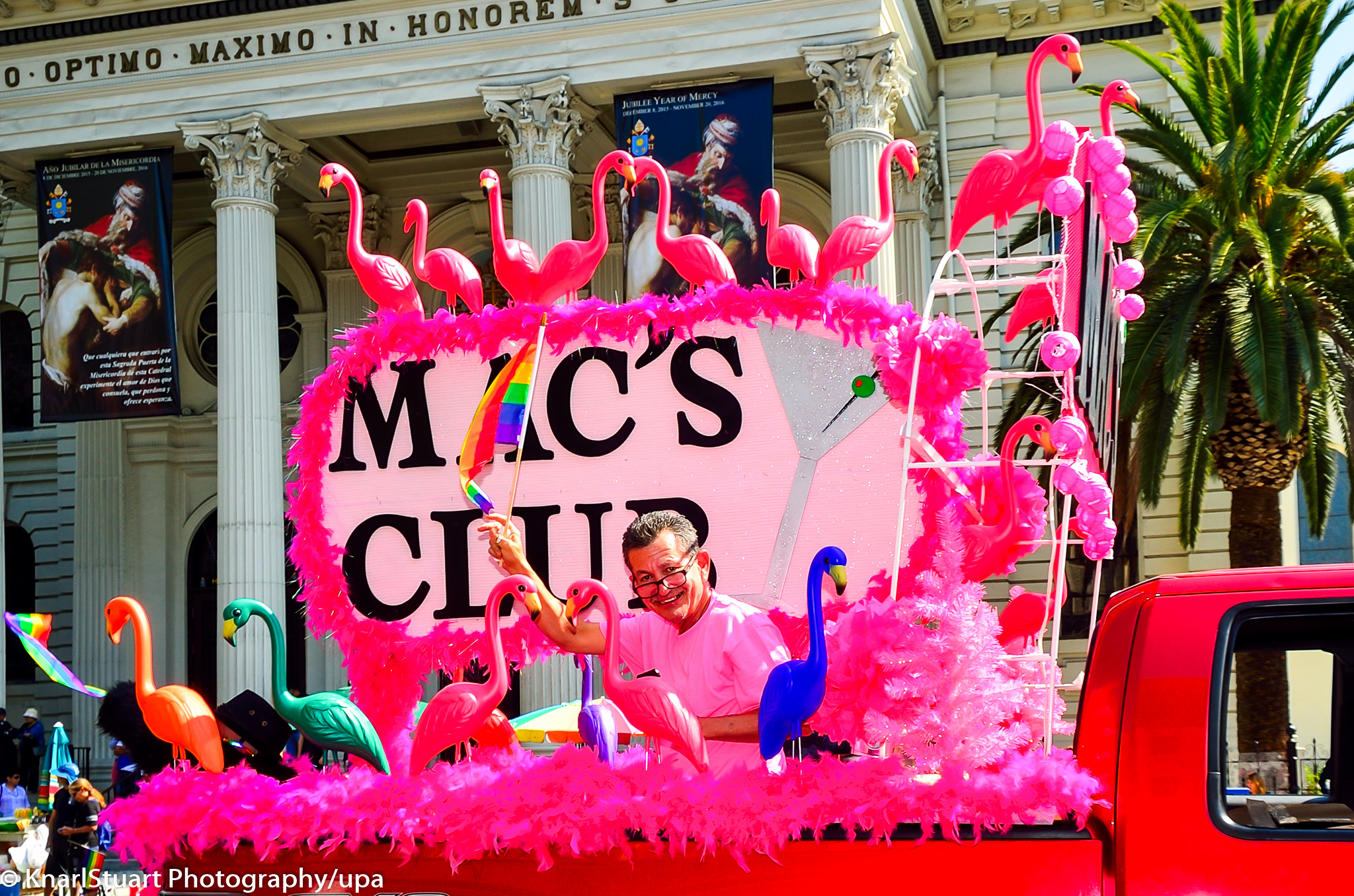
Pride parade

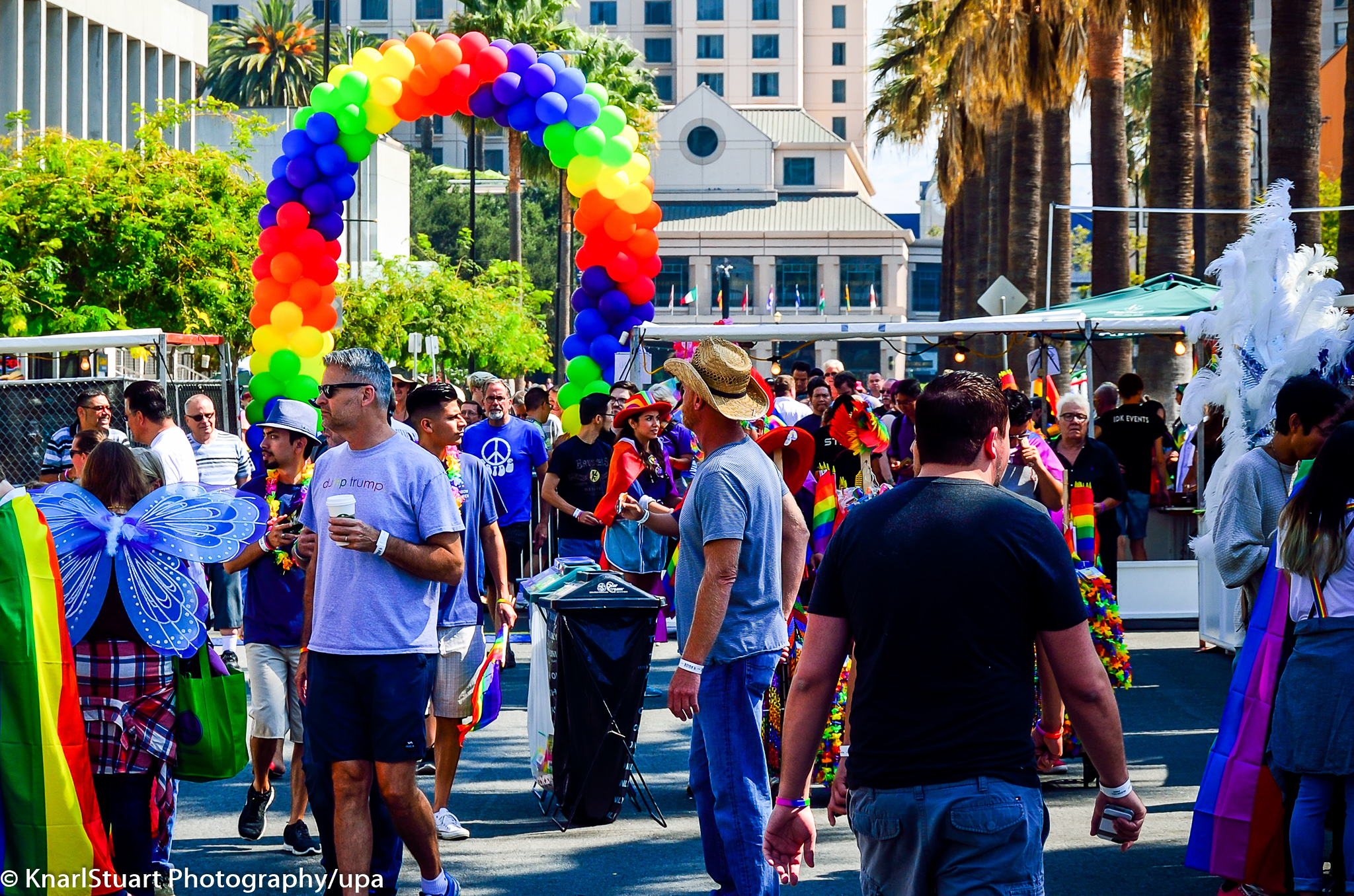
Booths at Plaza de César Chávez

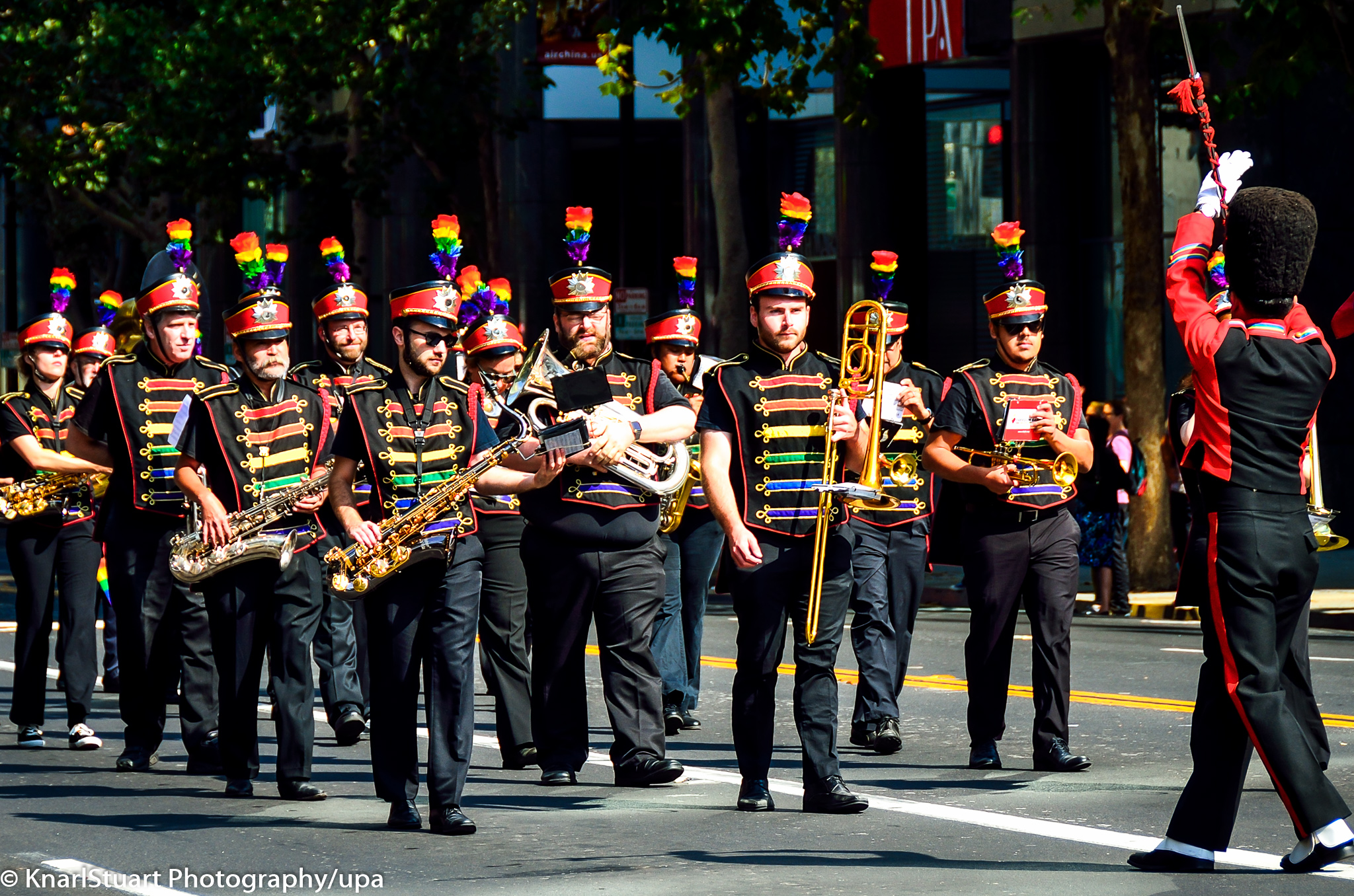
Gay/Lesbian Freedom Band

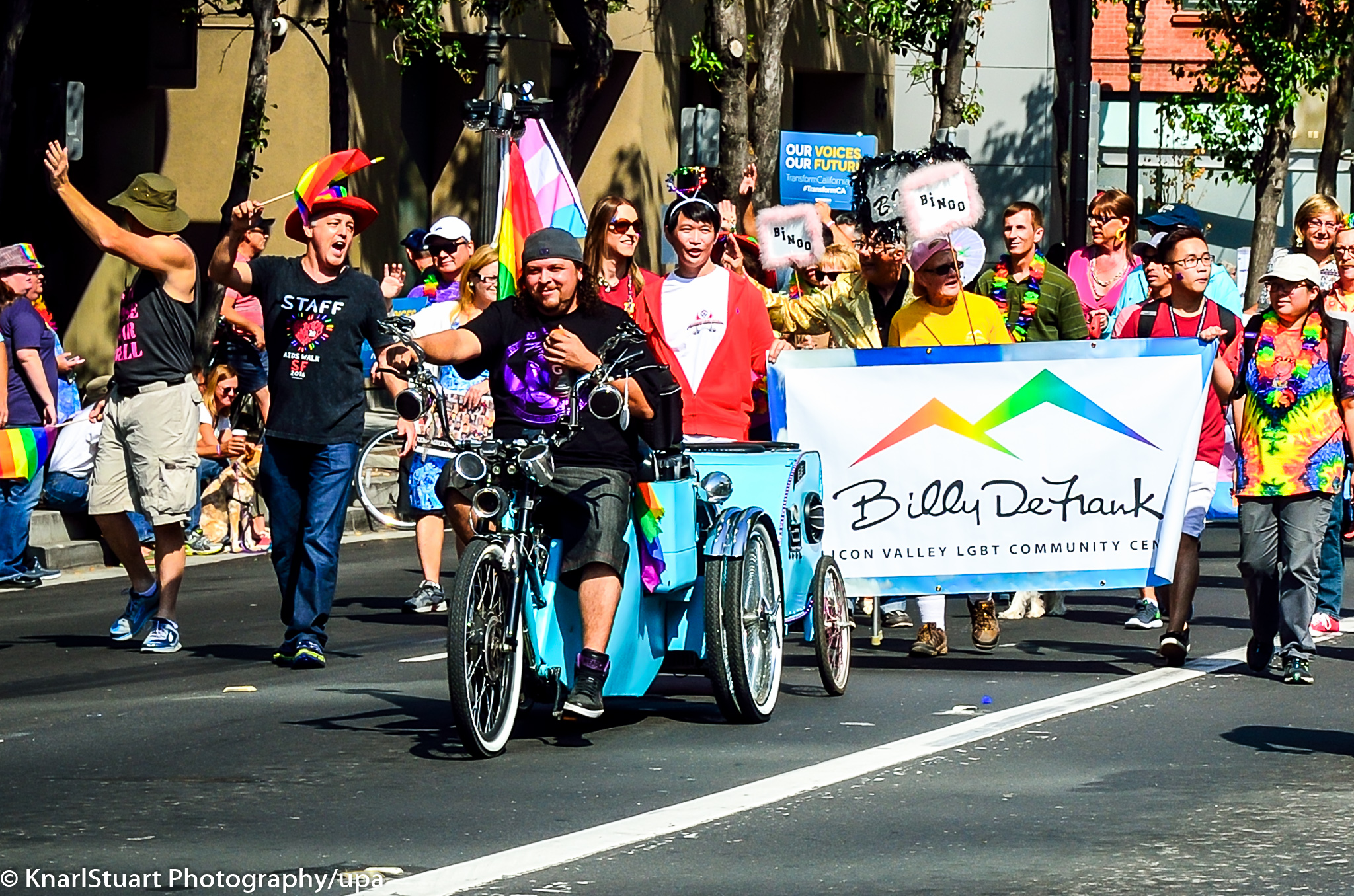
Billy DeFrank Community Center

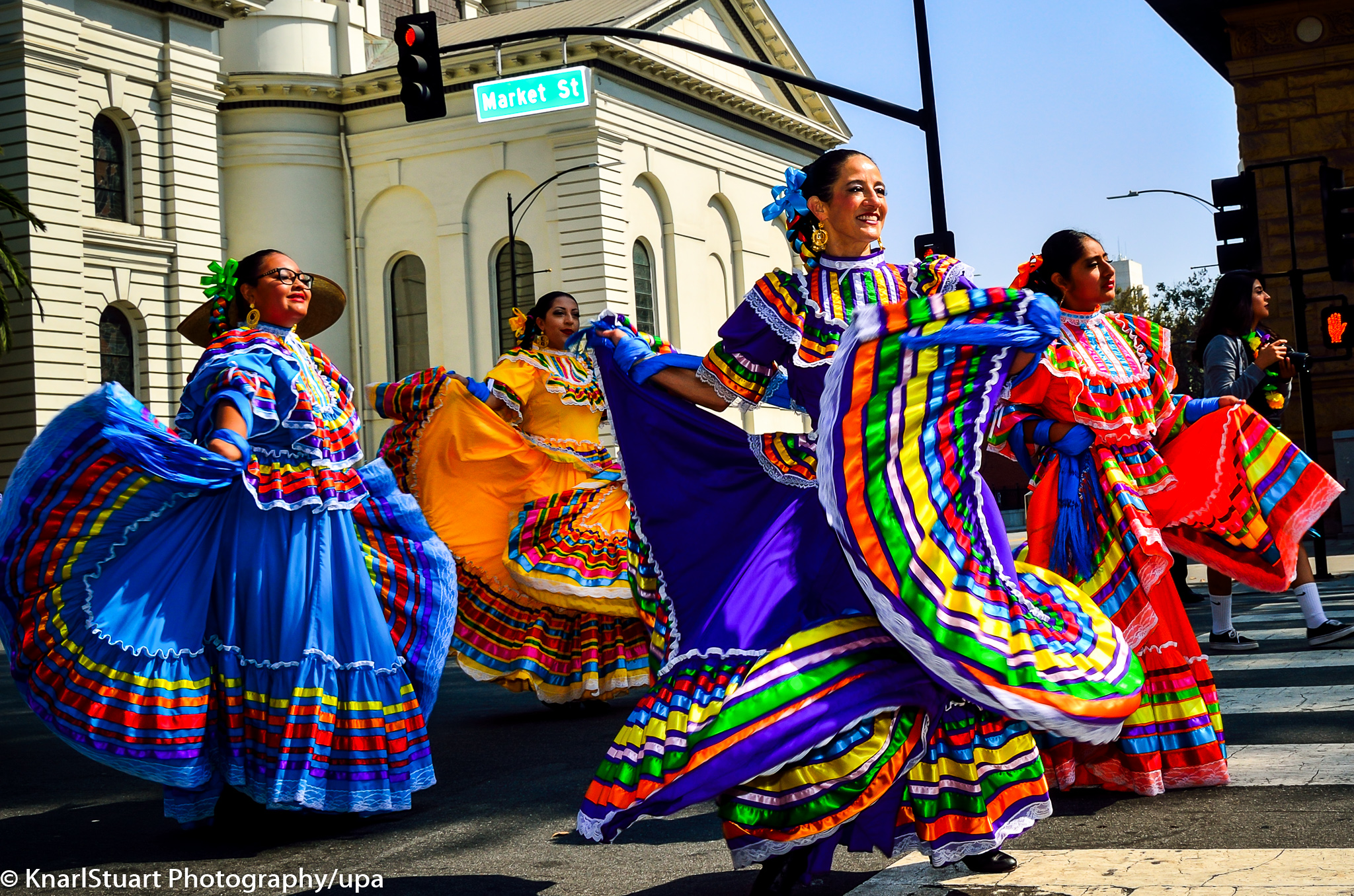
Traditional dancers

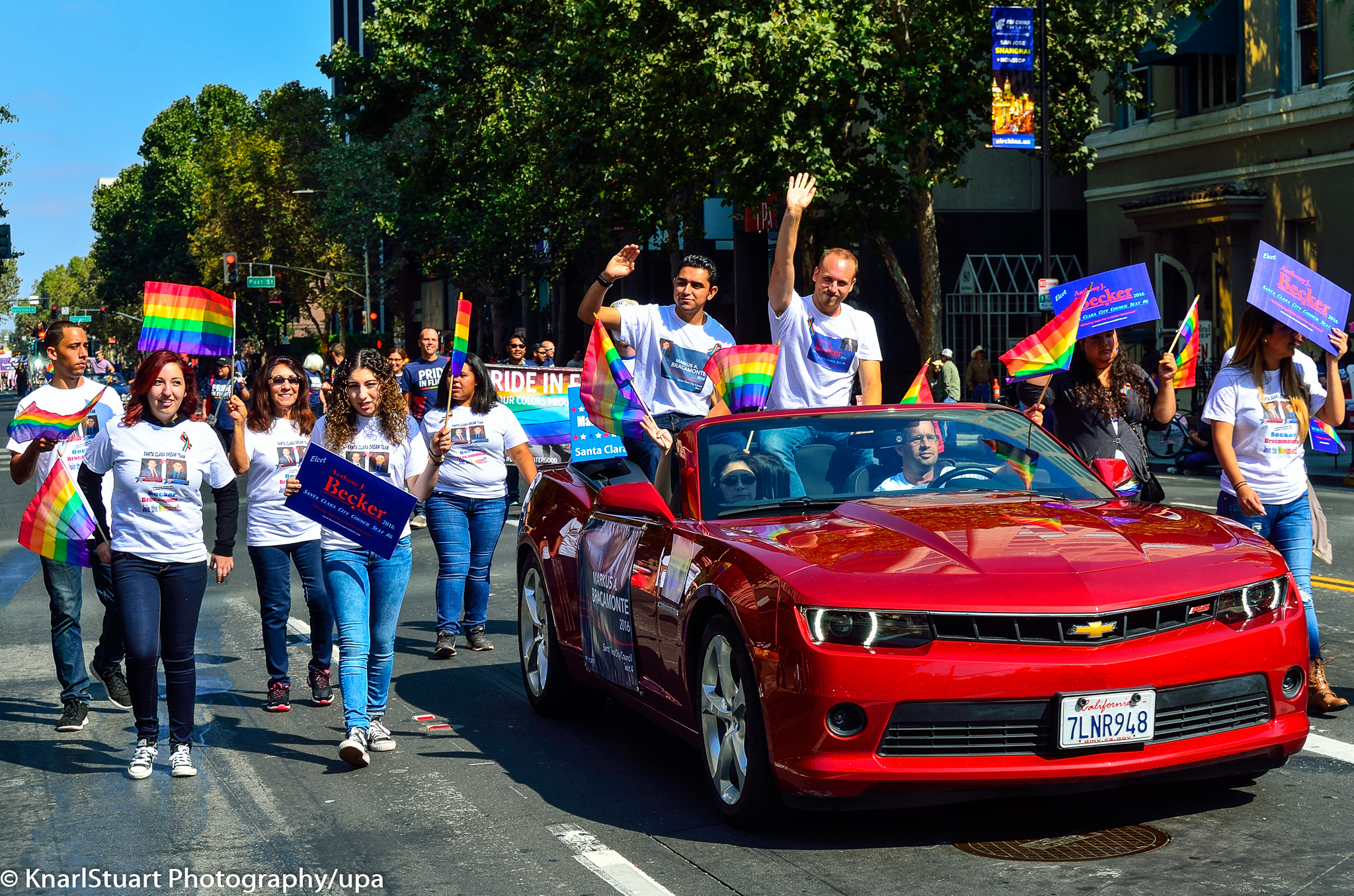
Pride parade

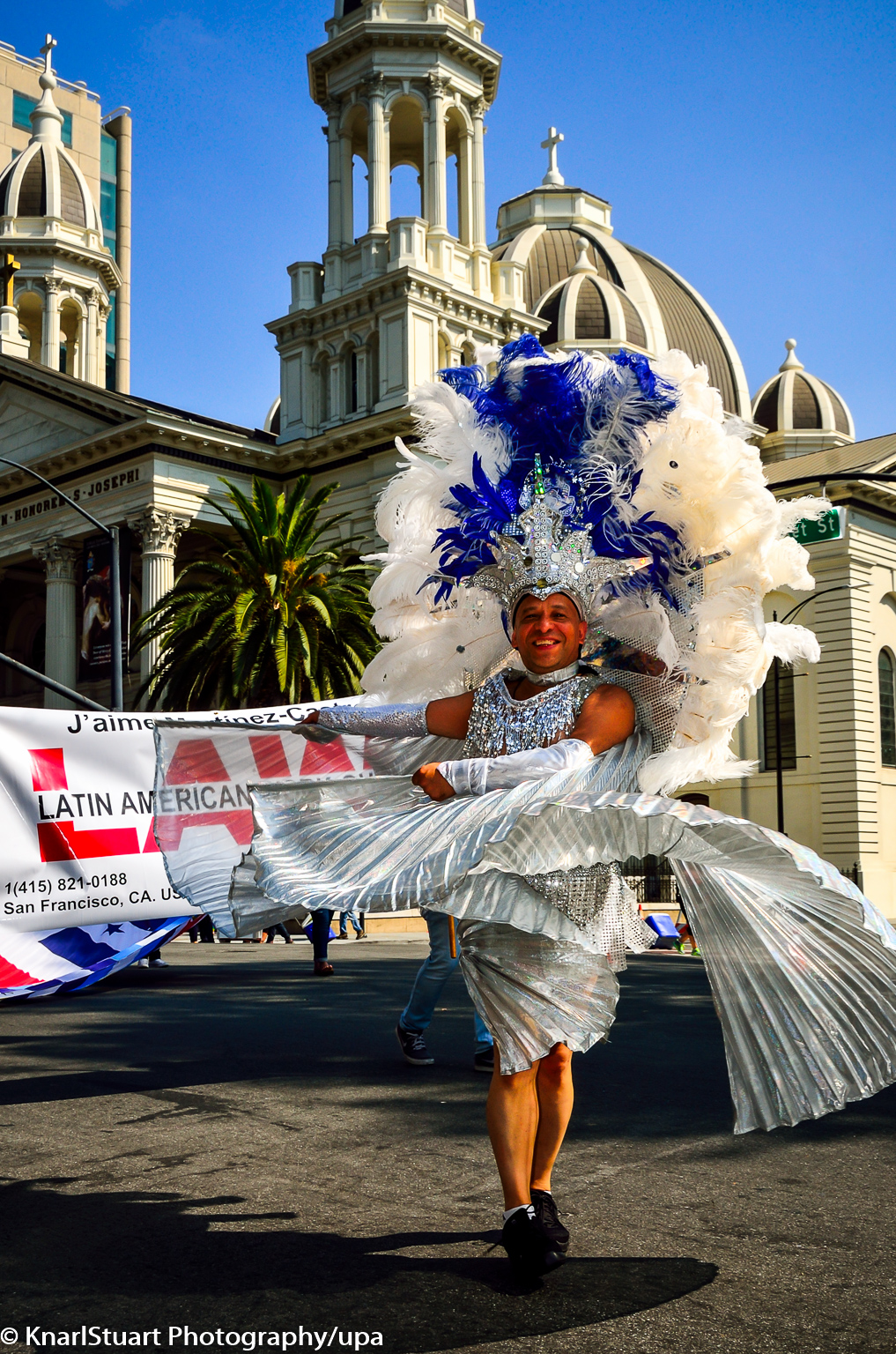
Drag queen
