= Christmas in the Park (San Jose) =

Annual holiday event in San Jose, California

Coordinates: 37°19′56″N 121°53′23″W

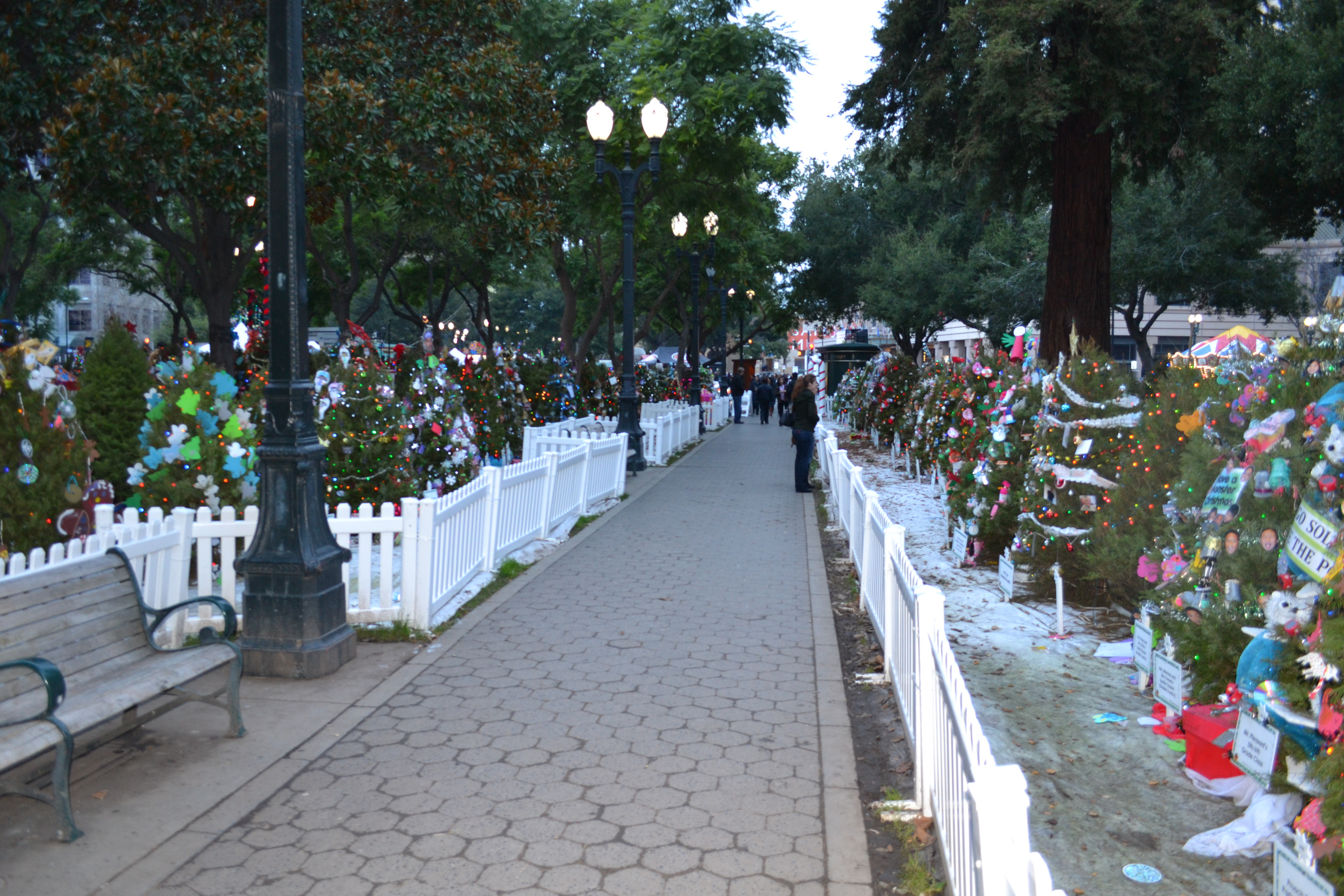
Exhibit of Christmas trees

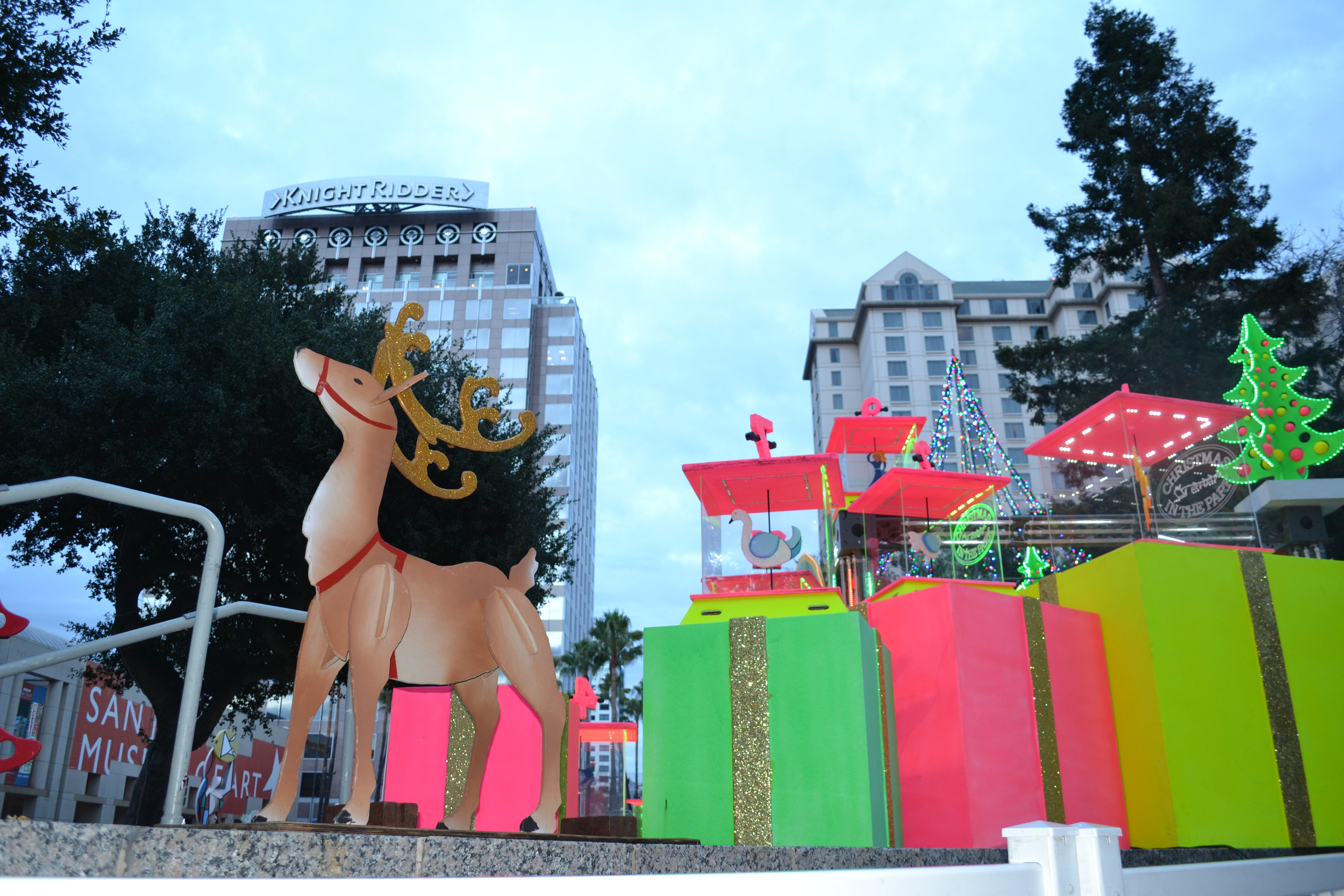
A display with downtown buildings in background

Christmas in the Park is a winter event in San Jose, California that takes place each year in Downtown San Jose, roughly from the last week of November to January 1. During this time, more than five hundred Christmas trees decorated by local schools and other groups are displayed in Plaza de César Chávez Park, usually with more than 50 Christmas-related musical and animated exhibits, a 55-foot high Community Giving Tree, and souvenir and treats shops.

The event brings an estimated $13 million in visitor spending to the city. It is free to the public, although donations to help offset its costs are suggested.

In 2020, due to the COVID-19 pandemic, Christmas in the Park pivoted to a drive-through event at San Jose's History Park.

== History ==
The Christmas in the Park event traces its origin to the Nativity display built by Don Lima in the 1950s in front of his Lima Family Mortuary in Willow Glen. The exhibit attracted attention and he began adding more displays, and as they grew, there were more visitors.

In the 1970s, he donated the exhibits to the City of San Jose. For a while they were set up on the lawn where San Jose's original City Hall used to be, at the intersection of First and Mission Streets. The City of San Jose and a non-profit (Christmas in the Park, Inc.) worked together to host a 2.5 acre holiday celebration.

The event was moved to Plaza de César Chávez in the early 1980s.

In 2011, the City could no longer afford to manage or raise funds for the event and it was scheduled to be closed and no longer take place. The non-profit took over the event and have increased attendance each year since – reaching over 700,000 in 2017.

== Gallery ==
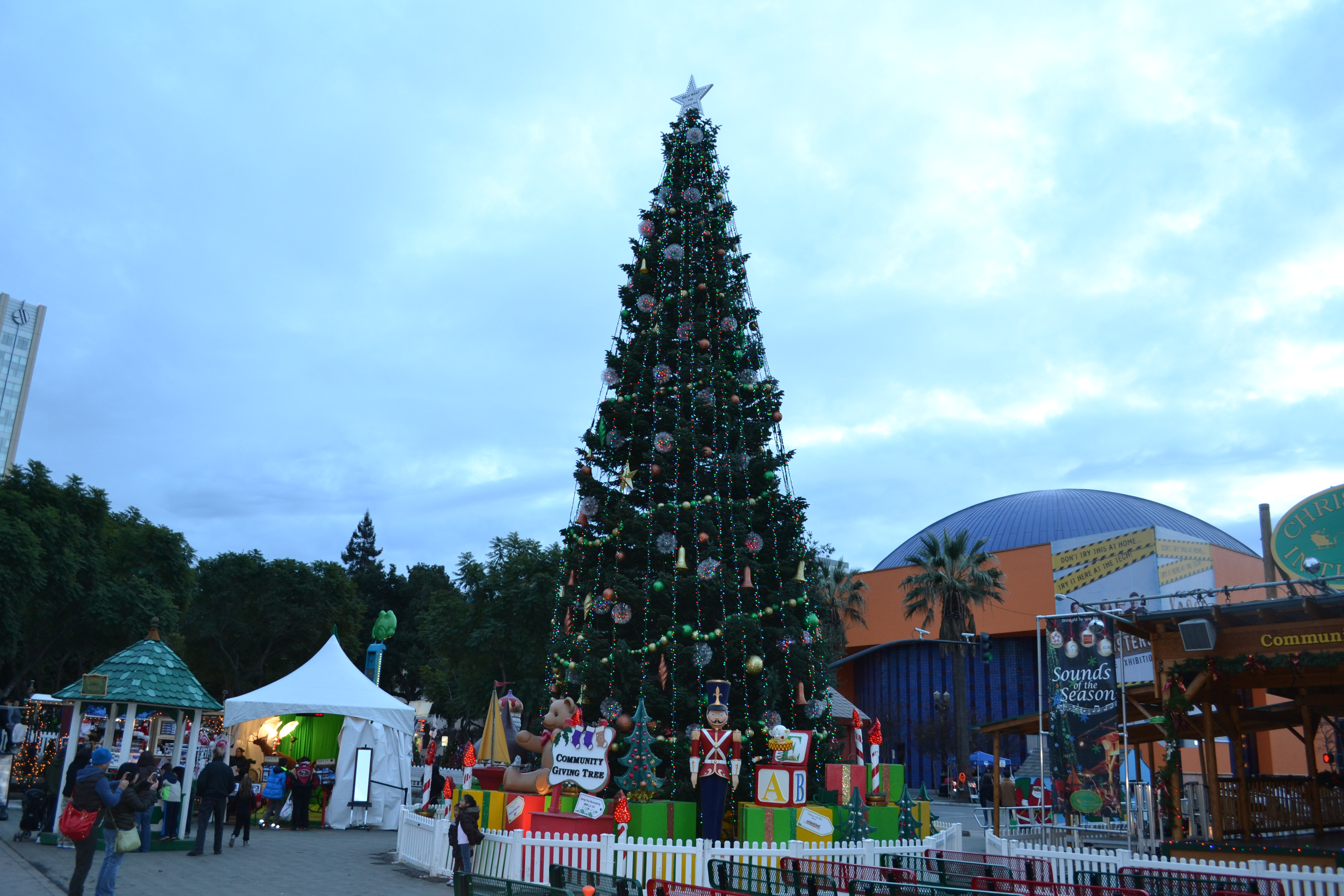
Community Giving Tree

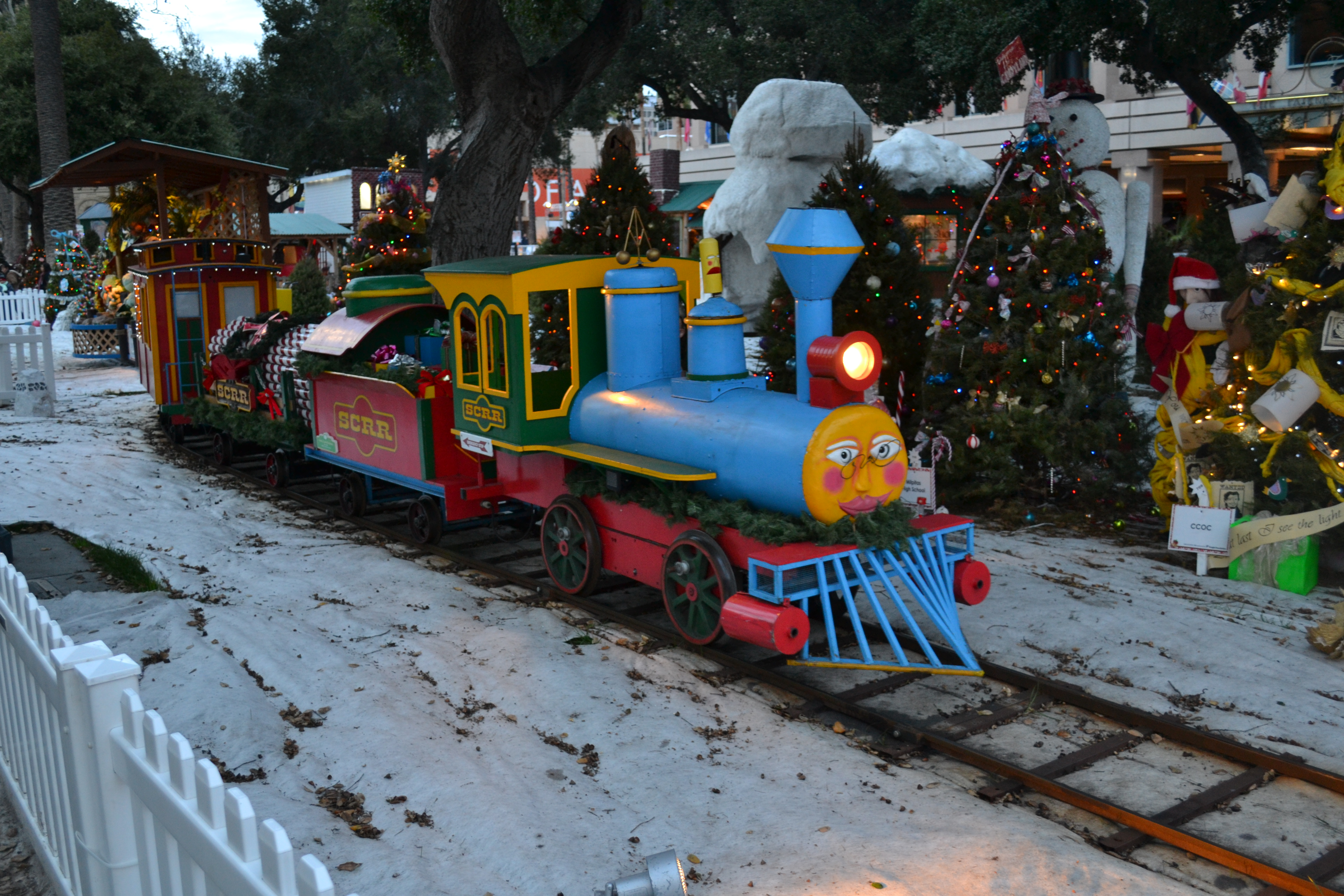
Miniature train on display in the park

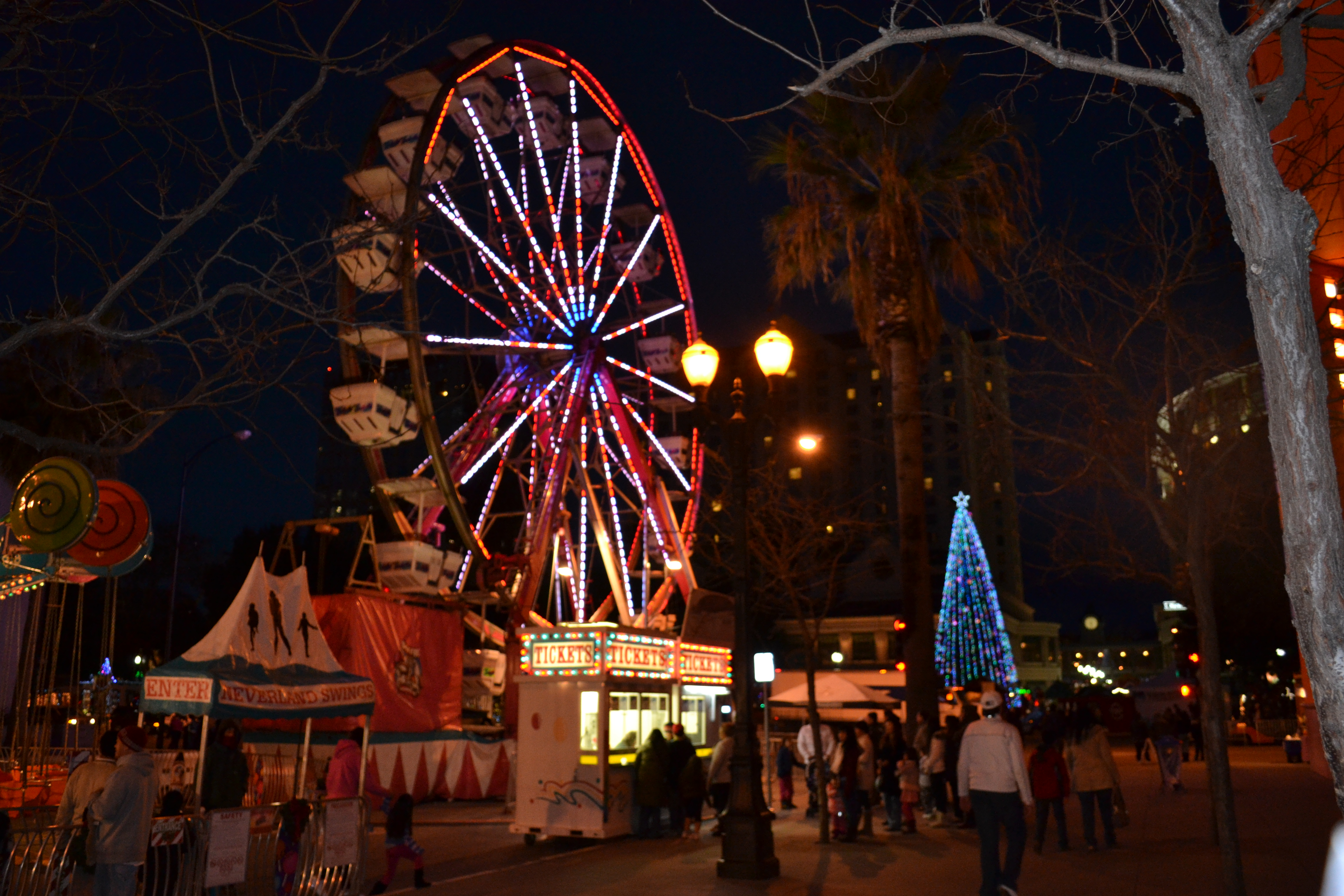
Ferris wheel ride

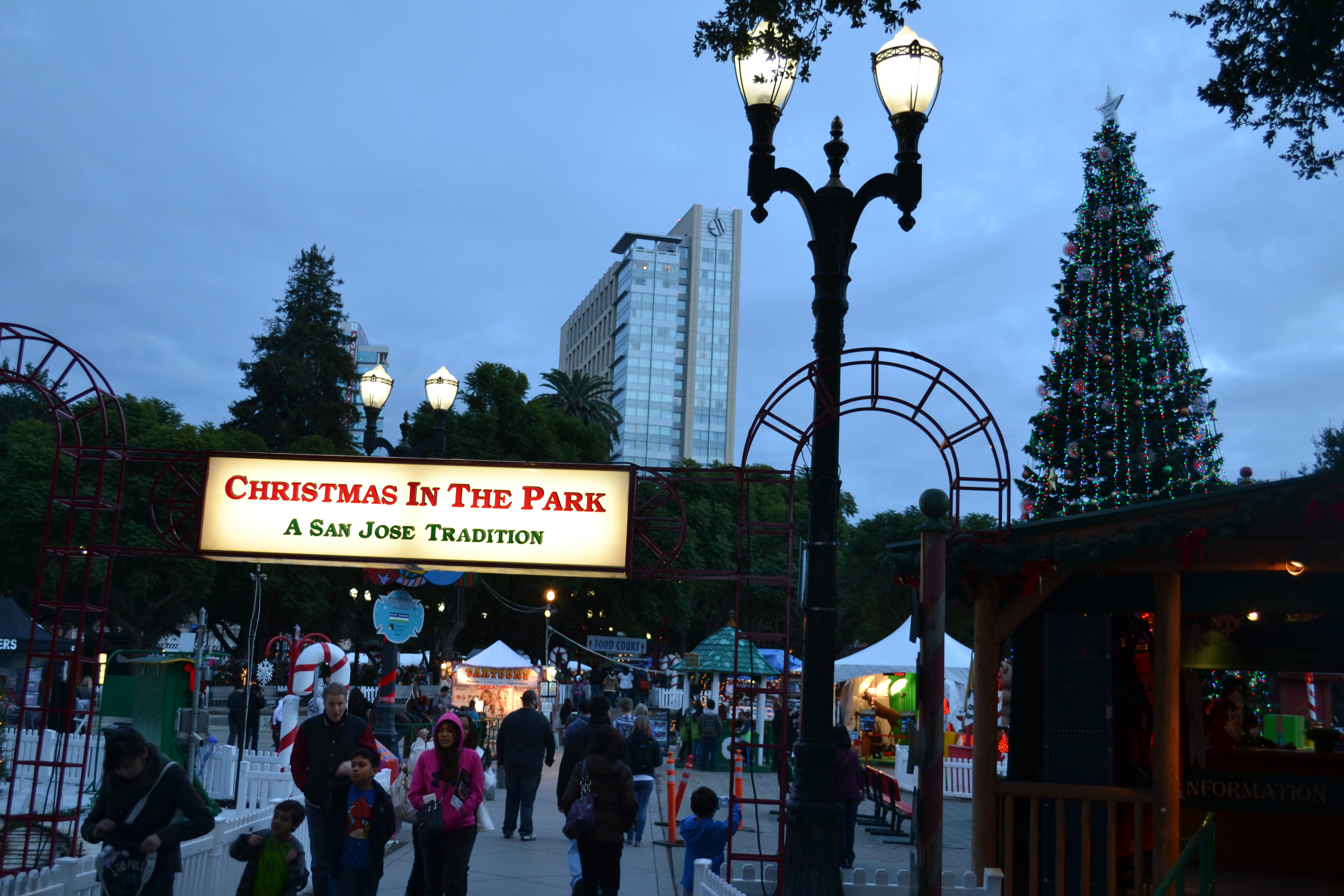
A view of the event

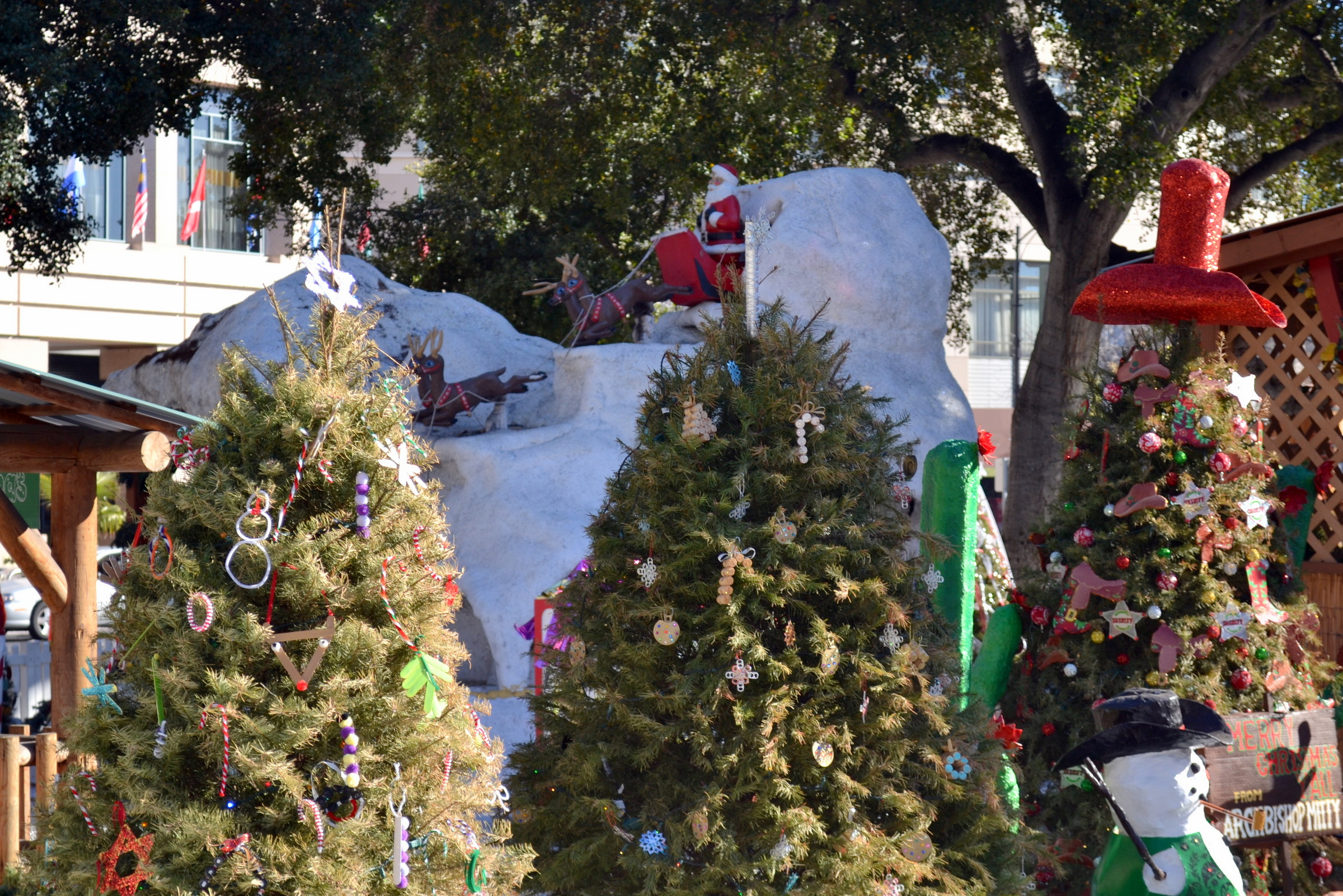
Santa exhibit

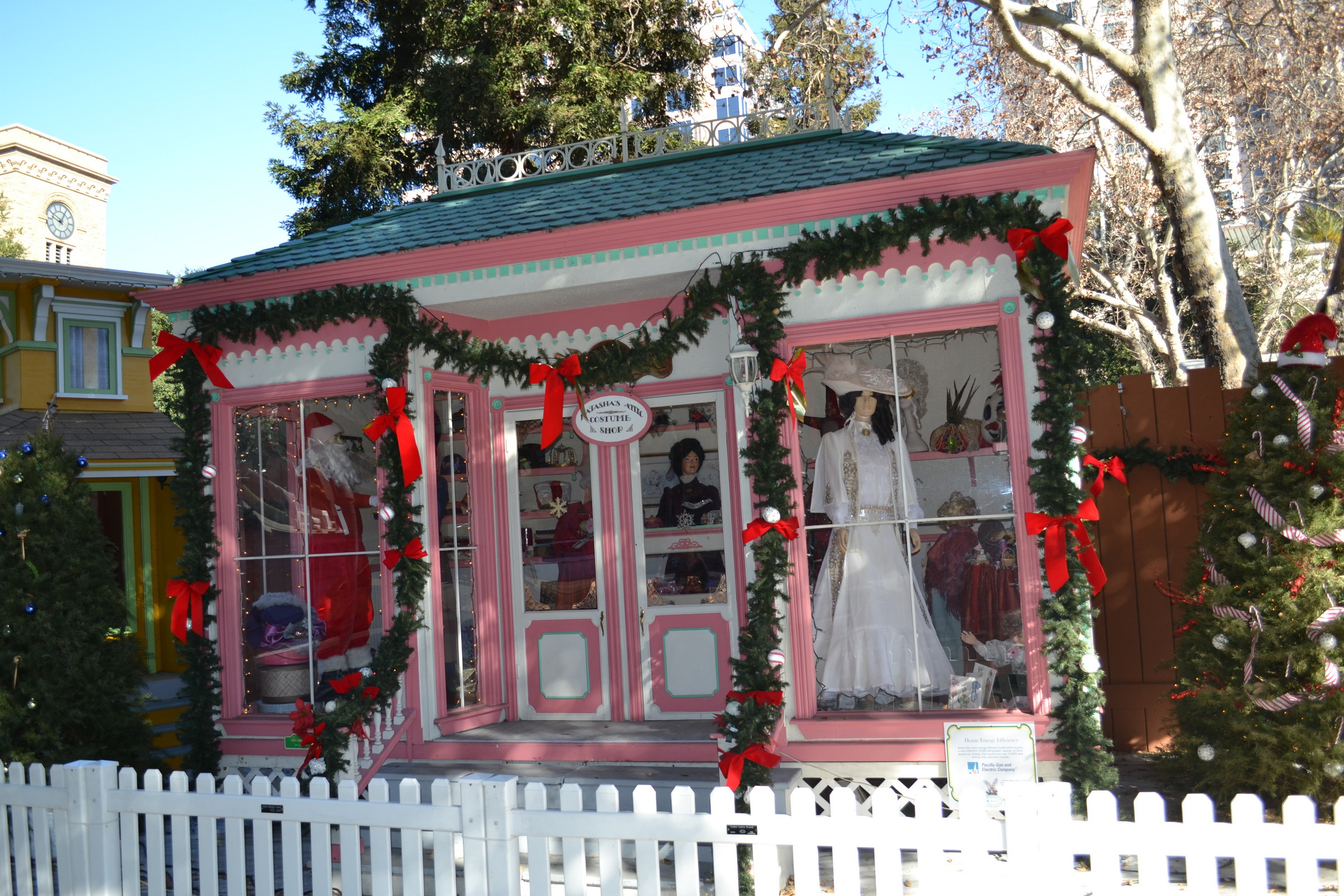
An exhibit of a historical costume shop
