= San Jose Jazz Festival =

Music festival in San Jose, California

San Jose Jazz Summer Fest
- Wide angle shot of the main stage during the Neville Brothers' performance (2006)
- Genre: Jazz, R&B, funk, pop
- Location: San Jose, California
- Coordinates: 37.332°N 121.89°W
- Years active: 1990–present
- Website: summerfest.sanjosejazz.org

The San Jose Jazz Summer Fest (originally known as the San Jose Jazz Festival) is an annual music festival organized by the non-profit San Jose Jazz and held in Plaza de César Chávez in downtown San Jose, California. The festival was established in 1990 as a one-day, single-stage event. The festival began charging admission in 2006. As of the 2025 edition, the main stage is in Plaza de César Chávez with others nearby .
