= List of tourist attractions in Santa Clara County =

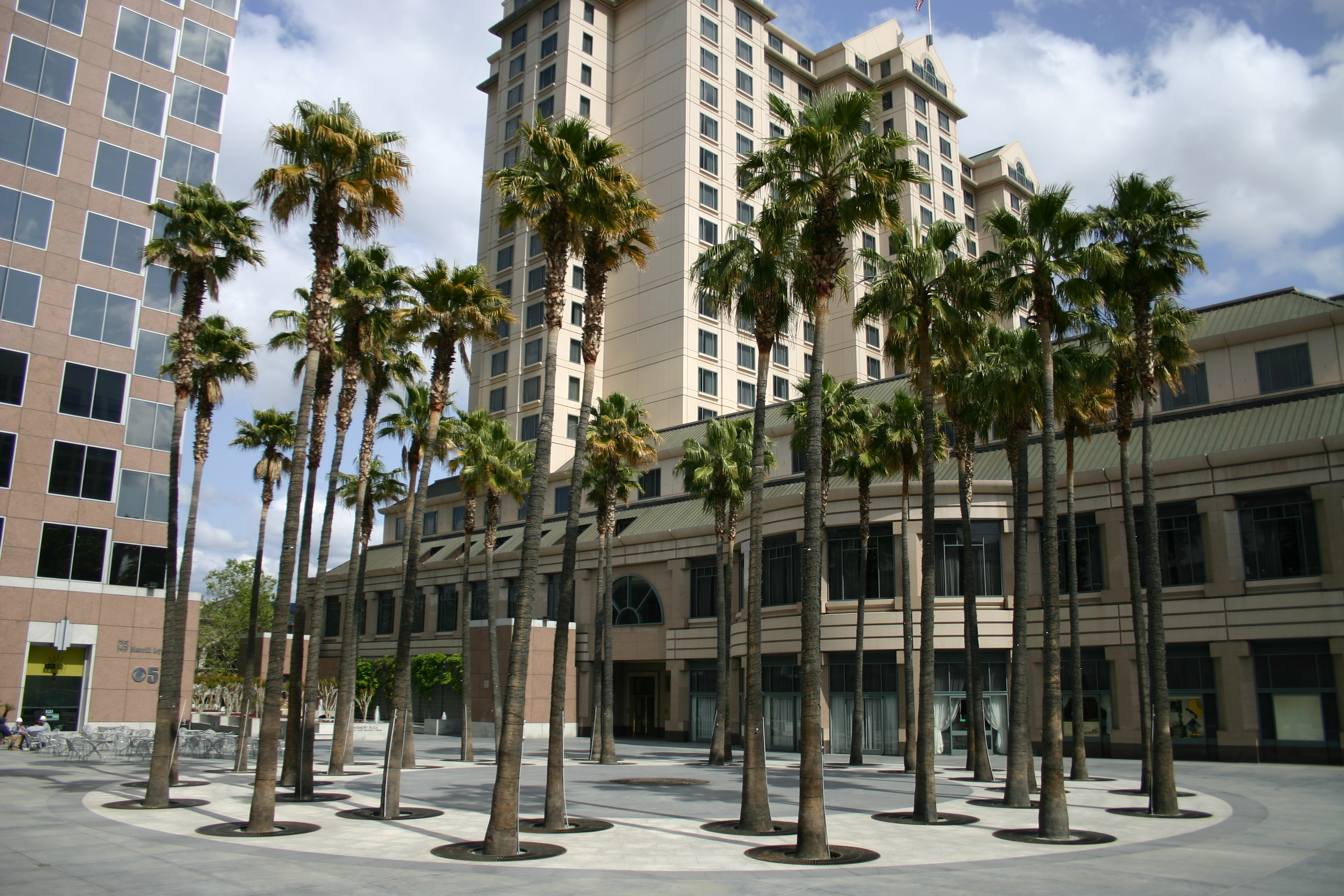
Circle of Palms, historical marker for California's first state capitol

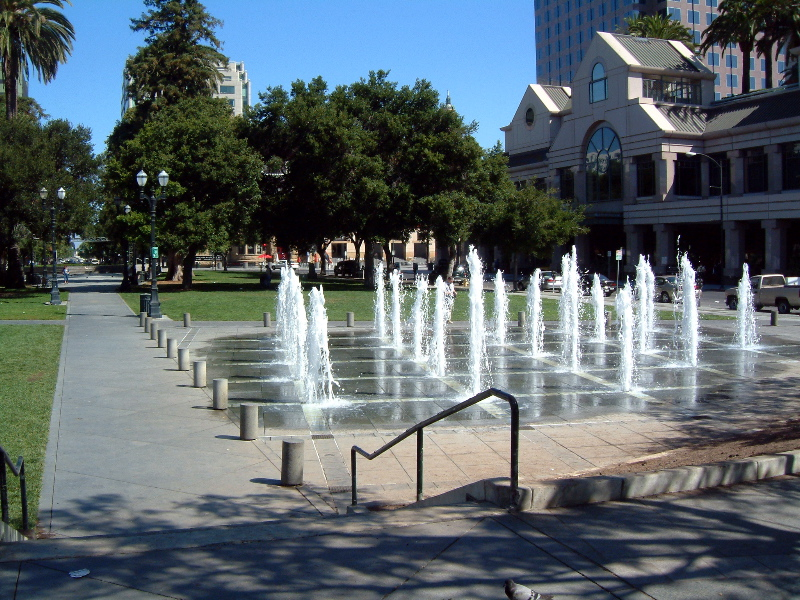
Plaza de César Chávez

This is a list of tourist attractions in and around Santa Clara County.

== Arboreta and gardens ==
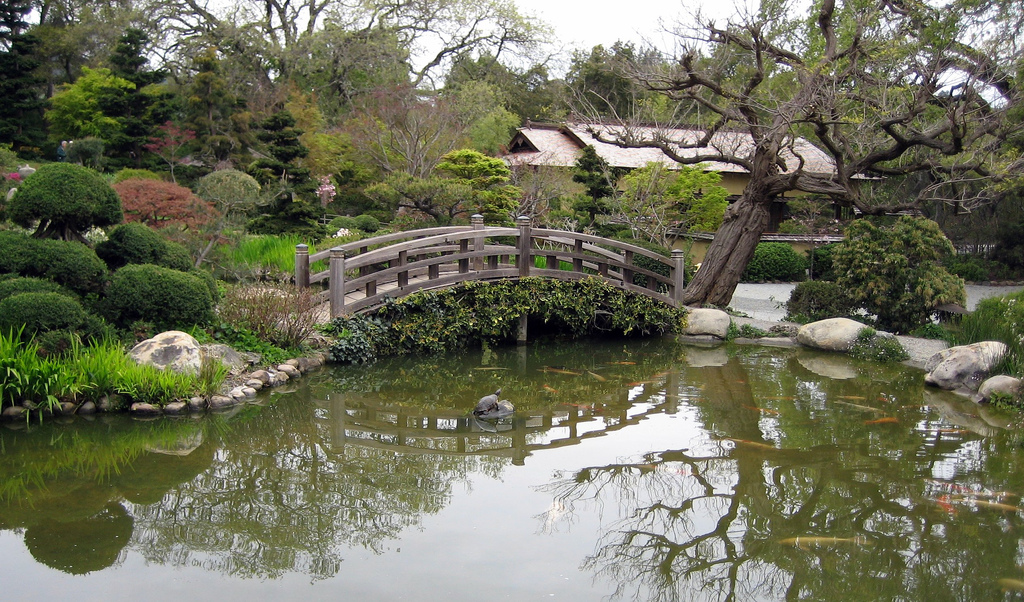
Hakone Gardens

- Arizona Cactus Garden, Stanford University
- Chinese Cultural Garden, San Jose
- Emma Prusch Farm Park, San Jose
- Filoli Estate, Woodside
- Gamble Gardens, Palo Alto
- Hakone Gardens, Saratoga
- Japanese Friendship Garden, at Kelley Park, San Jose
- Overfelt Gardens, East San Jose
- San Jose Municipal Rose Garden, downtown San Jose
- Stanford University Arboretum, Stanford University
- Villa Montalvo Arboretum, Saratoga

== Cultural ==
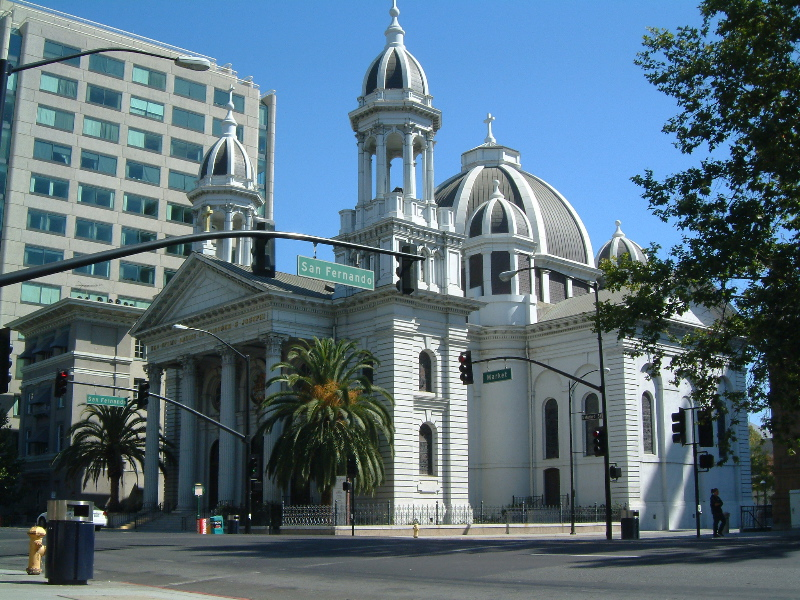
Cathedral Basilica of St. Joseph

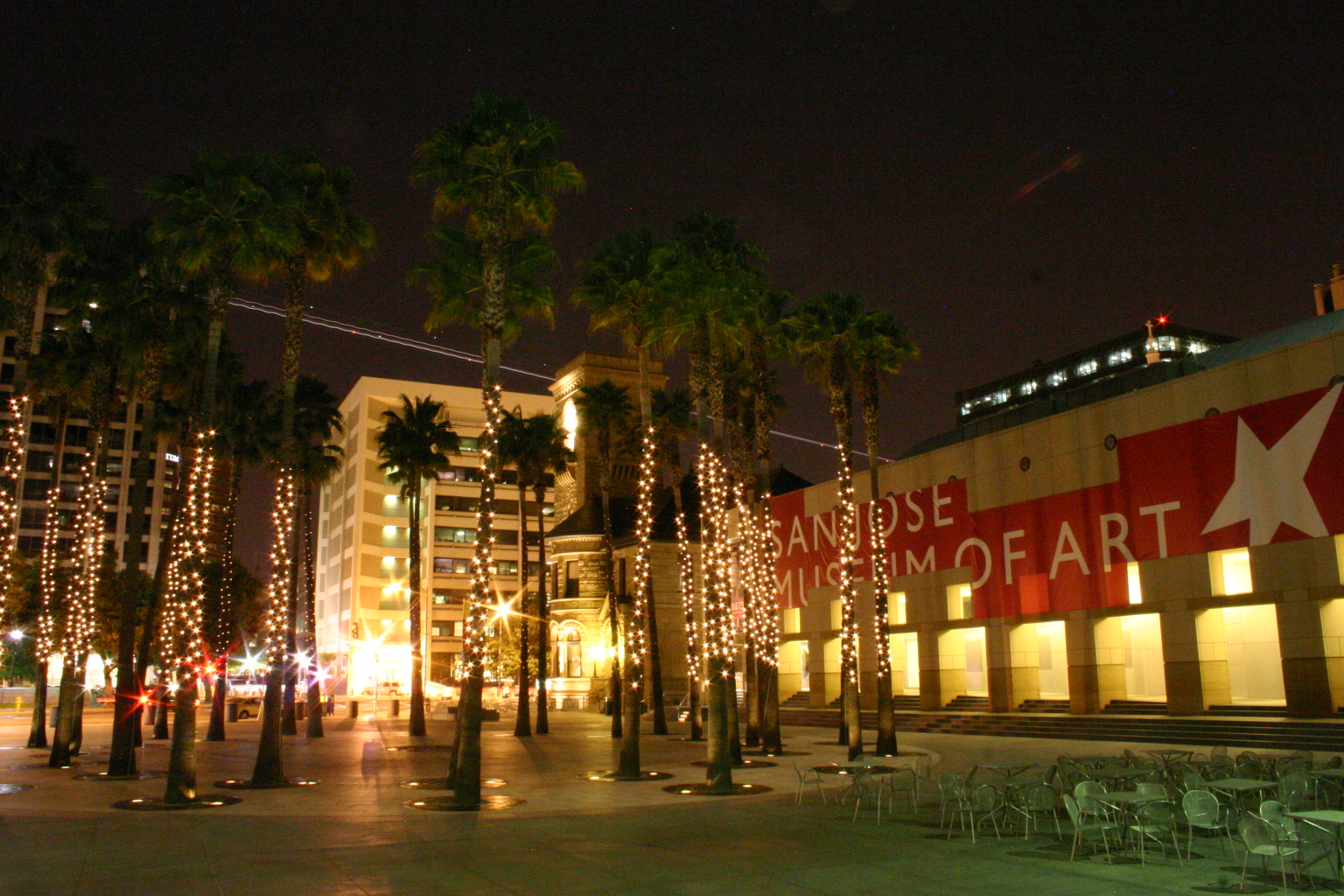
Circle of Palms and SJ Museum of Art

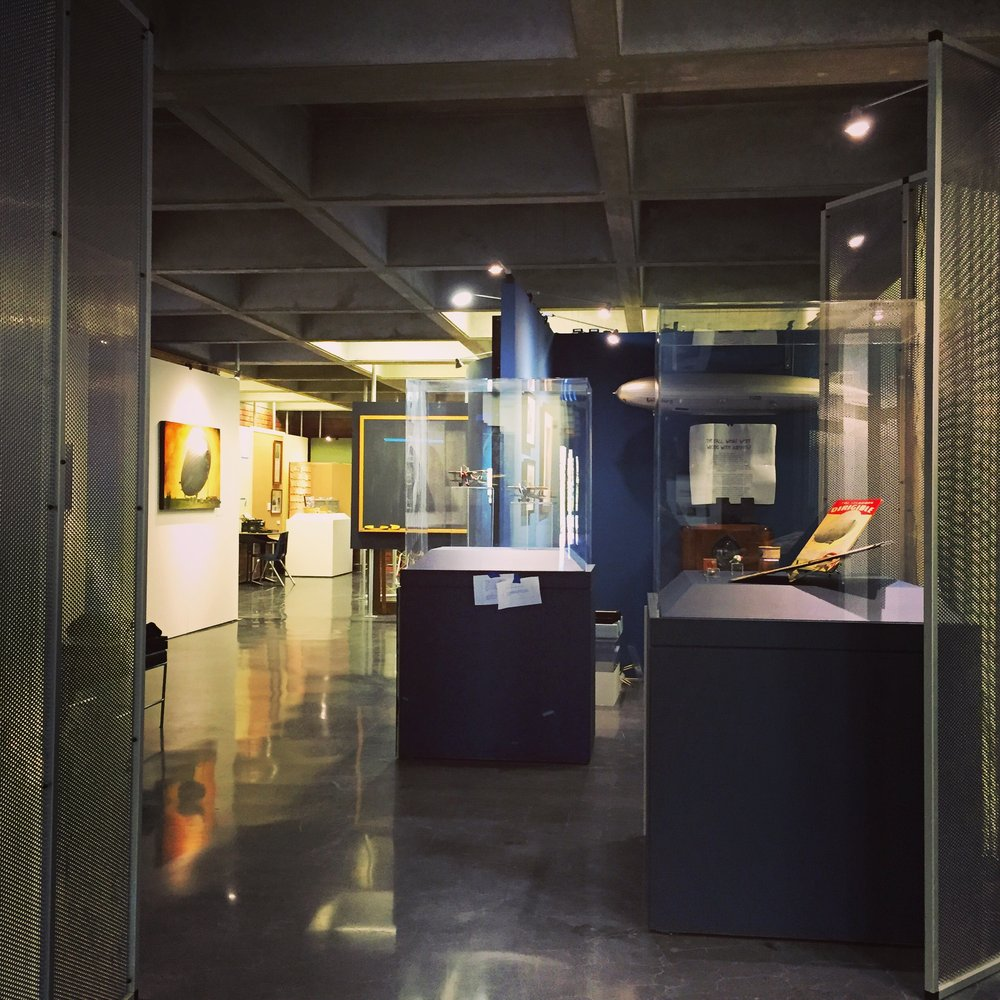
New Museum Los Gatos

=== Art ===
This is a list of South Bay art museums and art collectives/cooperatives.

- The Anderson Collection, at Stanford University, Stanford
- Allied Arts Guild, Menlo Park
- De Saisset Museum, at Santa Clara University, Santa Clara
- Iris & B. Gerald Cantor Center for Visual Arts at Stanford University, Stanford
- The Lace Museum, Sunnyvale
- New Museum Los Gatos, Los Gatos
- Pacific Art League, Palo Alto
- Palo Alto Art Center, Palo Alto
- San Jose Museum of Art, downtown San Jose
- San Jose Museum of Quilts & Textiles, San Jose
- The Foster Museum, Palo Alto
- Triton Museum of Art, Santa Clara
- Montalvo Arts Center, Saratoga, California

=== Dance ===
- Ballet San Jose, downtown San Jose (closed 2018)
- sjDANCEco, downtown San Jose

=== Estate ===
- Emma Prusch Farm Park, San Jose
- Filoli Estate, Woodside
- Gamble Gardens, Palo Alto
- Rengstorff House, Mountain View
- Villa Montalvo, Saratoga
- Winchester Mystery House, West San Jose

=== Faith-based ===
- Cathedral Basilica of St. Joseph, downtown San Jose
- Five Wounds Portuguese National Church, Little Portugal, San Jose
- Gurdwara Sahib of San Jose, East San Jose
- Stanford Memorial Church, at Stanford University

=== Historical ===
- Burlingame Museum of PEZ Memorabilia, Burlingame
- Circle of Palms Plaza, downtown San Jose
- De Anza Hotel, downtown San Jose
- Forbes Mill, Los Gatos
- Hangar One, Mountain View
- Hiller Aviation Museum, San Carlos
- History Park at Kelley Park, Willow Glen (south-central San Jose)
- Japanese American Museum of San Jose, San Jose
- Little Italy San Jose, San Jose
- Mexican Heritage Plaza, East San Jose
- Museum of American Heritage, Palo Alto
- New Almaden, Quicksilver Mining Museum
- New Museum Los Gatos, Los Gatos
- The HP Garage, Palo Alto
- Los Altos History Museum, Los Altos
- Peralta Adobe, downtown San Jose
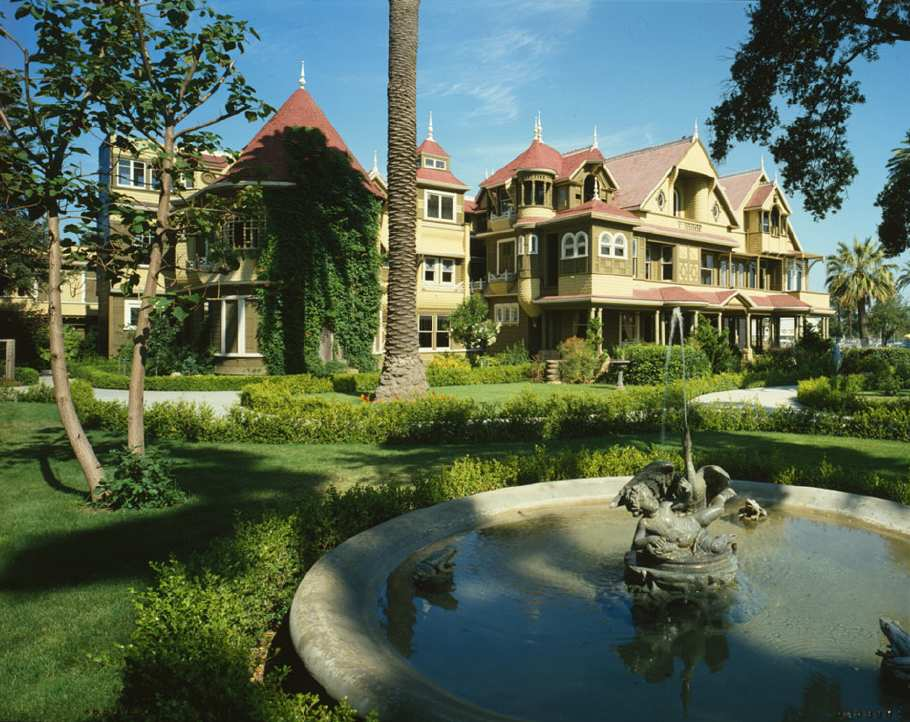
  Winchester Mystery House
- Portuguese Historical Museum, East San Jose
- Viet Museum, East San Jose
- Rosicrucian Egyptian Museum, downtown San Jose
- San Jose Museum of Quilts & Textiles, downtown San Jose
- Sunnyvale Heritage Park Museum, Sunnyvale
- Winchester Mystery House, West San Jose

=== Music ===
- Choral Project, downtown San Jose
- Ira F. Brilliant Center for Beethoven Studies, downtown San Jose
- Opera San Jose, downtown San Jose
- Symphony San Jose, downtown San Jose
- Vivace Youth Chorus of San Jose, San Jose

=== Theatre ===
- City Lights Theater Company of San Jose, San Jose
- Hillbarn Theatre, Foster City
- Los Altos Stage Company, Los Altos
- Montgomery Theater, San Jose
- Palo Alto Players Theatre Company, Palo Alto
- Pear Theatre, Mountain View
- Portola Valley Theatre Conservatory, Portola Valley
- Ram's Head Theatrical Society, Stanford University
- San Jose Center for the Performing Arts, downtown San Jose
- San Jose Improv, downtown San Jose
- San Jose Repertory Theatre, downtown San Jose
- San Jose Stage Company, San Jose
- Sierra Repertory Theatre, San Jose
- Sunnyvale Community Players, Sunnyvale
- Tabard Theatre Company, San Jose
- TheatreWorks Theatre Company, Palo Alto and Mountain View

==== Children's Theatre ====
- Children's Musical Theater San Jose, San Jose
- Palo Alto Children's Theatre Company, Palo Alto
- Peninsula Youth Theatre, Mountain View
- Roberta Jones Junior Theatre, Santa Clara
- San Carlos Children's Theater, San Carlos
- Silicon Valley Children's Musical Theater, San Jose
- Willow Glen Children's Theatre, San Jose

=== Other ===
- Dr. Martin Luther King, Jr. Library, downtown San Jose
- San Jose City Hall, downtown San Jose
- San Jose Flea Market, Berryessa (northeast San Jose)

== Event venues ==
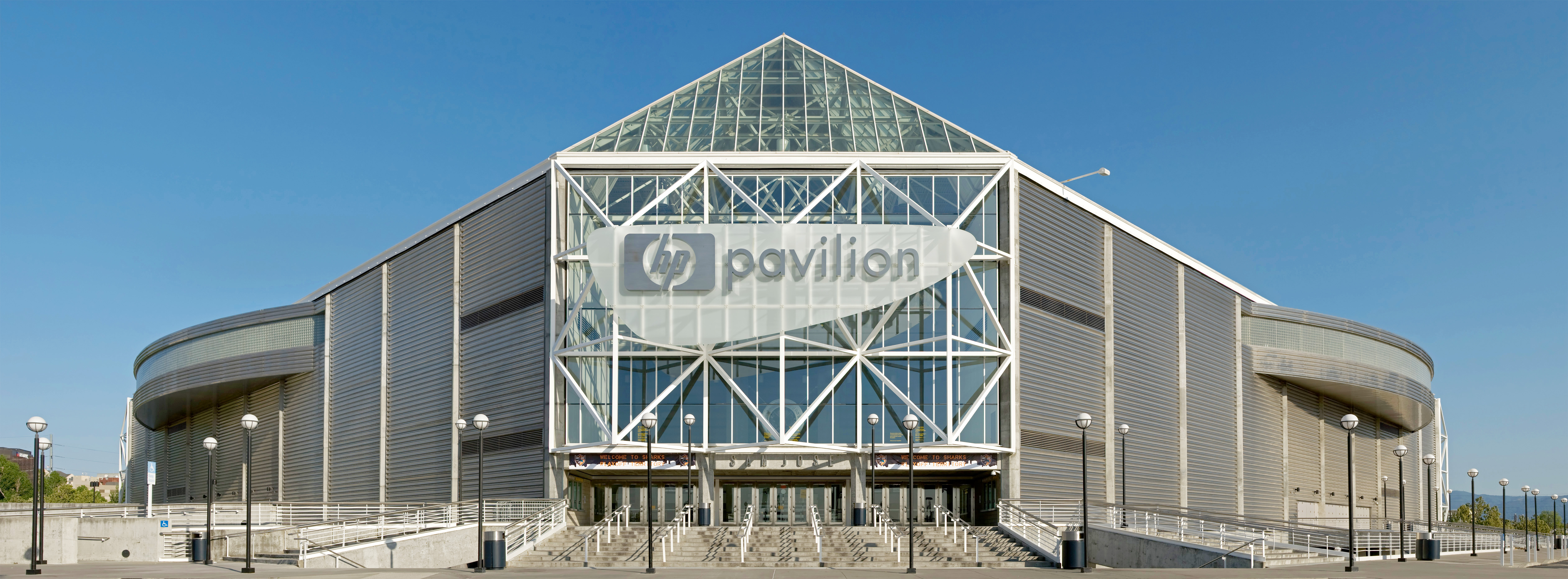
SAP Center (formerly HP Pavilion) (SJ Arena)

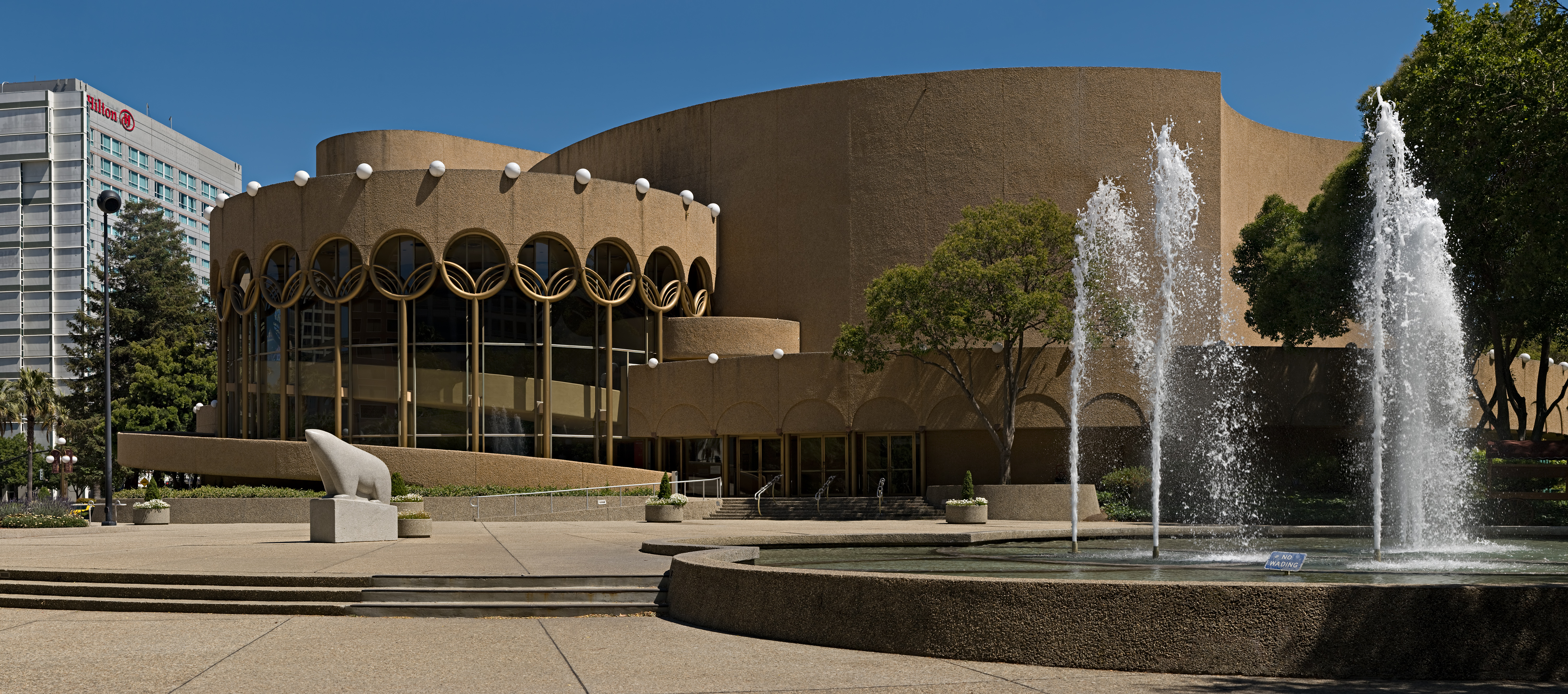
San Jose Center for the Performing Arts

This is a list of larger event venues.

- PayPal Park, San Jose
- Buck Shaw Stadium, Santa Clara
- California Theatre, downtown San Jose
- City National Civic Events, San Jose
- Event Center Arena, downtown San Jose
- The Flint Center for the Performing Arts, Cupertino
- Levi's Stadium, Santa Clara
- Lucie Stern Theater, Palo Alto
- Montgomery Theater, San Jose
- San Jose Center for the Performing Arts, downtown San Jose
- San Jose Civic Auditorium, downtown San Jose
- San Jose Convention Center, downtown San Jose
- San Jose Municipal Stadium, downtown San Jose
- San Jose Repertory Theatre, downtown San Jose
- Santa Clara Convention Center, Santa Clara
- SAP Center at San Jose, downtown San Jose
- Shoreline Amphitheatre, Mountain View
- Spartan Stadium, downtown San Jose
- Stanford Stadium, Stanford

== Events ==
SJ Jazz Festival

- BayCon, Santa Clara
- Christmas in the Park, downtown San Jose
- Cinequest Film Festival, multiple venues
- FanimeCon, downtown San Jose
- Los Altos Art and Wine Festival, Los Altos
- Mountain View Art and Wine Festival, Mountain View
- Palo Alto Festival of the Arts, Palo Alto
- San Francisco International Asian American Film Festival, downtown San Jose
- San Jose Bike Party, monthly bicycle ride in San Jose area, different route each time
- San Jose Jazz Festival, downtown San Jose
- Stanford Jazz Festival, Stanford University

== Parks and trails ==
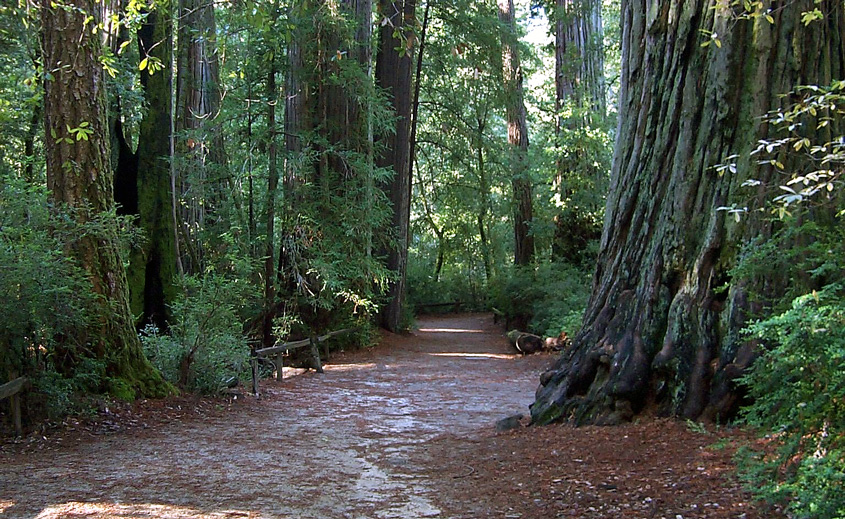
Big Basin Redwoods State Park

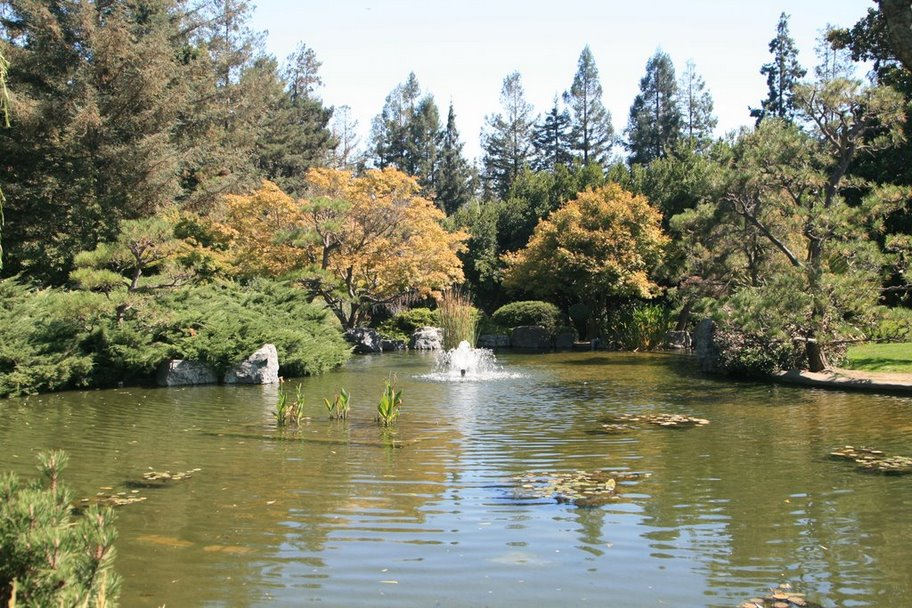
Japanese Friendship Garden (Kelley Park)

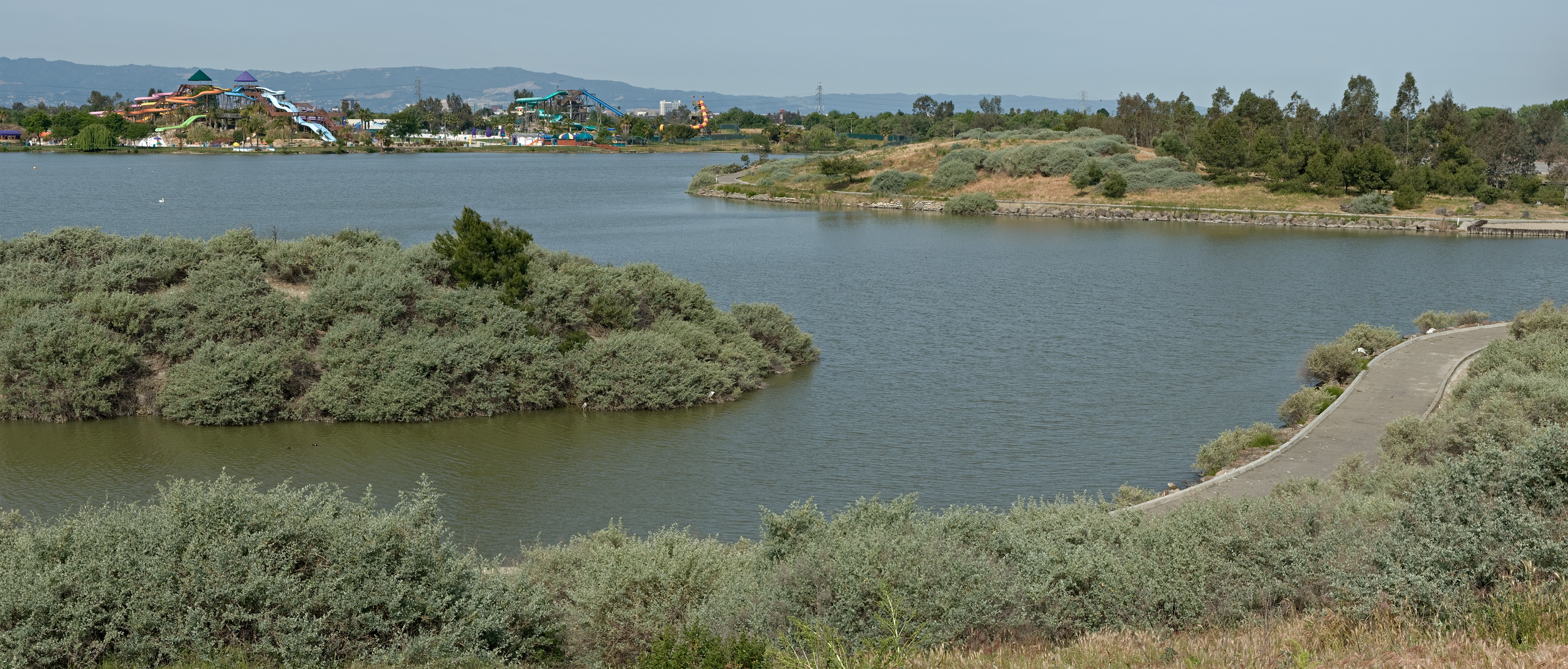
Lake Cunningham

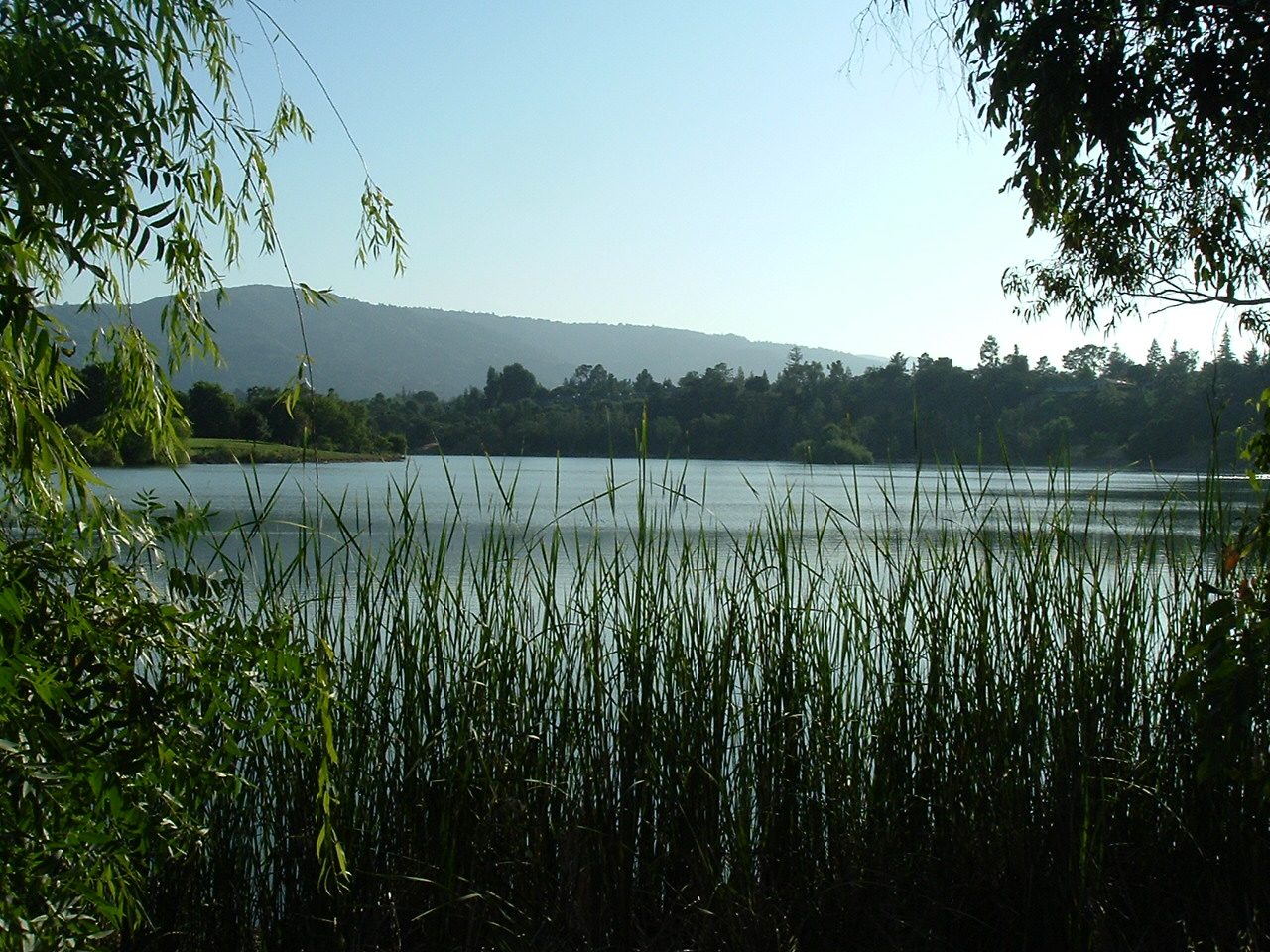
Vasona Park Lake

- Almaden Lake Park, South San Jose
- Almaden Quicksilver County Park, South San Jose
- Alum Rock Park, East San Jose
- Bay Area Ridge Trail, surrounds and crosses the South Bay
- Belgatos Park and connected Heintz, and Santa Rosa open space preserves, Los Gatos
- Castle Rock State Park, Santa Cruz Mountains
- Coyote Creek Trail, San Jose to Morgan Hill
- Ed R. Levin County Park, Milpitas
- Fremont Older Open Space Preserve, Saratoga
- Grant Ranch Park, East San Jose/Mount Hamilton
- Guadalupe River Trail, downtown San Jose, Willow Glen and South San Jose
- Kelley Park, Willow Glen (south-central San Jose)
- Lake Cunningham, East San Jose
- Los Alamitos Creek Trail, South San Jose
- Los Gatos Creek Trail, West San Jose, Campbell and Los Gatos
- Mission Peak, Fremont, California
- Plaza de César Chávez, downtown San Jose
- Rancho San Antonio Open Space Preserve, Santa Cruz Mountains
- Rosicrucian Park, downtown San Jose
- San Francisco Bay Trail, Palo Alto, Mountain View, Sunnyvale, Santa Clara, San Jose and Milpitas
- Sanborn Park, Saratoga and Santa Cruz Mountains
- Santa Teresa County Park, South San Jose
- Shoreline Park, Mountain View, Mountain View
- Stevens Creek Trail, Cupertino, Sunnyvale and Mountain View
- Uvas Canyon County Park, west of Morgan Hill
- Vasona Park, Los Gatos
- Villa Montalvo Arboretum, Saratoga

See additional parks, hiking trails, and open space preserves at: Santa Clara County Parks and Recreation Department, Midpeninsula Regional Open Space District

== Science, technology and education ==
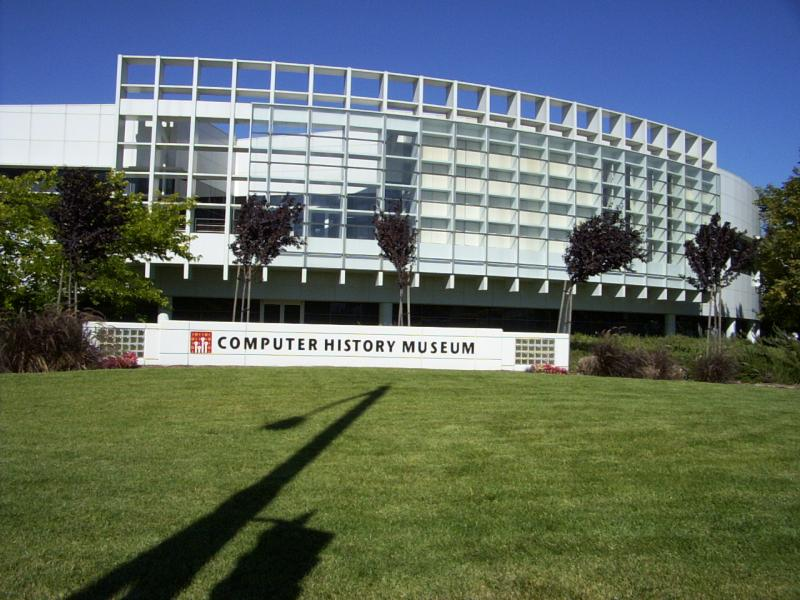
Computer History Museum

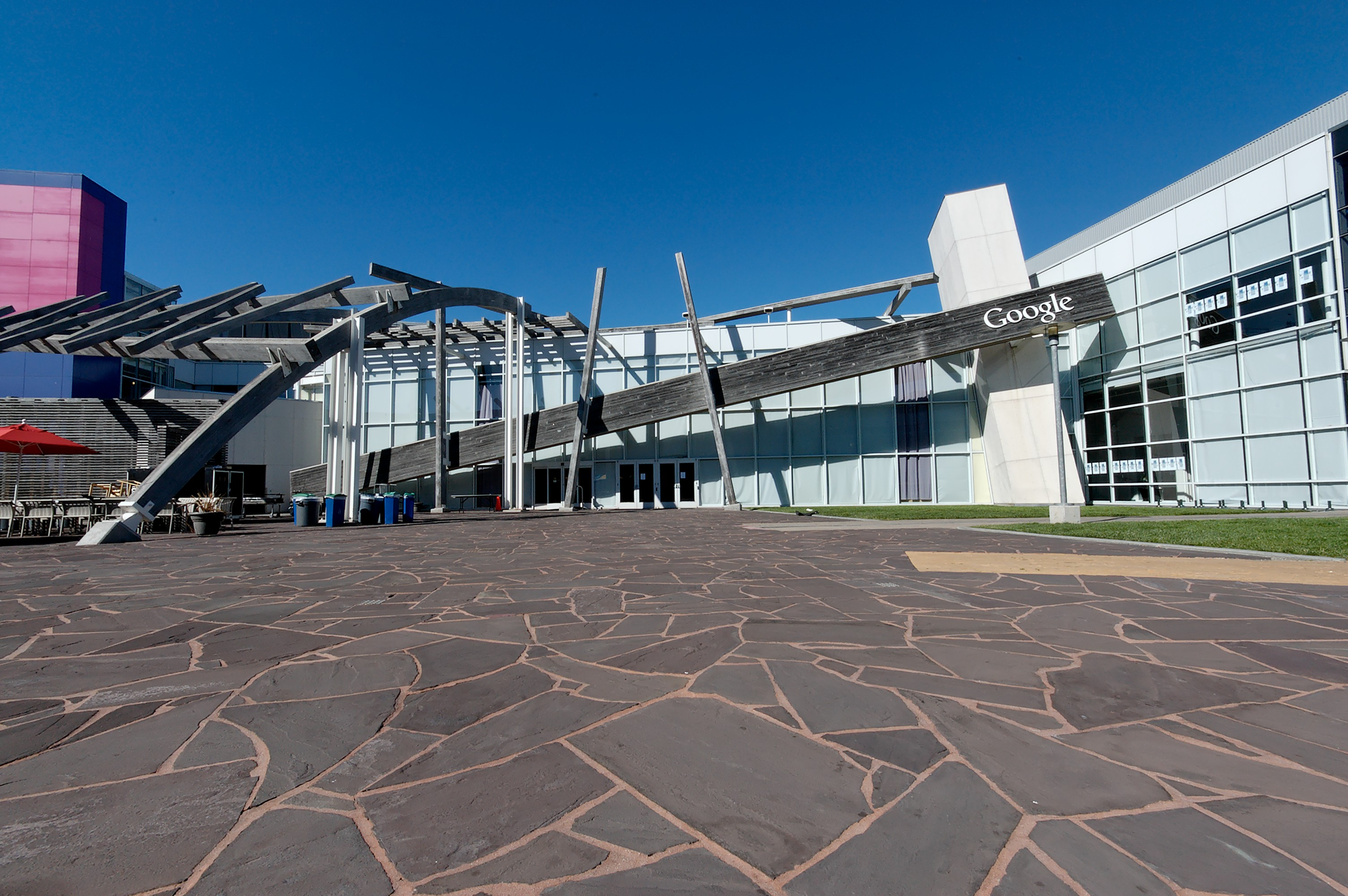
Googleplex

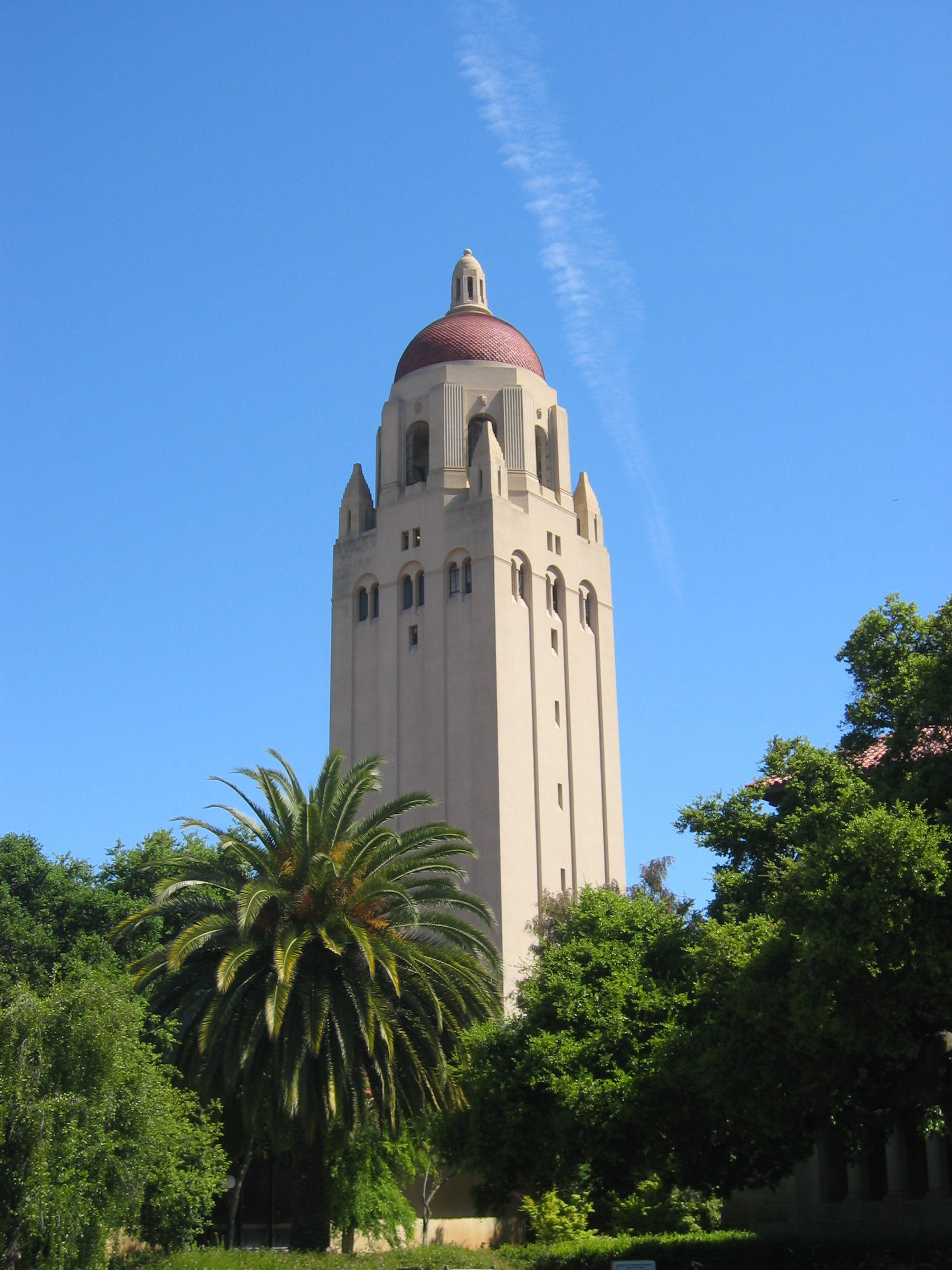
Stanford University

- Children's Discovery Museum of San Jose, downtown San Jose
- Computer History Museum, Mountain View
- DeAnza College Fujitsu Planetarium, Cupertino
- EcoCenter, Palo Alto Baylands, Palo Alto
- Lick Observatory, Mount Hamilton, San Jose
- Museum of American Heritage, Palo Alto
- NASA Ames Exploration Center, Mountain View
- Palo Alto Junior Museum and Zoo, Palo Alto
- San Jose electric light tower (model, in History Park at Kelley Park, San Jose)
- San Jose State University, downtown San Jose
- Santa Clara University, Santa Clara
- Stanford University, Stanford
- The Tech Interactive, formerly The Tech Museum of Innovation, downtown San Jose

=== Technology campuses ===
- Apple Park, Cupertino
- Facebook headquarters, Menlo Park
- Googleplex, Mountain View
- Intel Museum, Intel campus, Santa Clara

== Shopping ==
- Eastridge Center, East San Jose
- Great Mall of the Bay Area, Milpitas
- Pruneyard Shopping Center, Campbell
- San Antonio Shopping Center, Mountain View
- Santana Row, West San Jose
- Stanford Shopping Center, Palo Alto
- Westfield Oakridge, South San Jose
- Westfield Valley Fair, West San Jose
- Westgate Mall, West San Jose

== Theme parks and tours ==
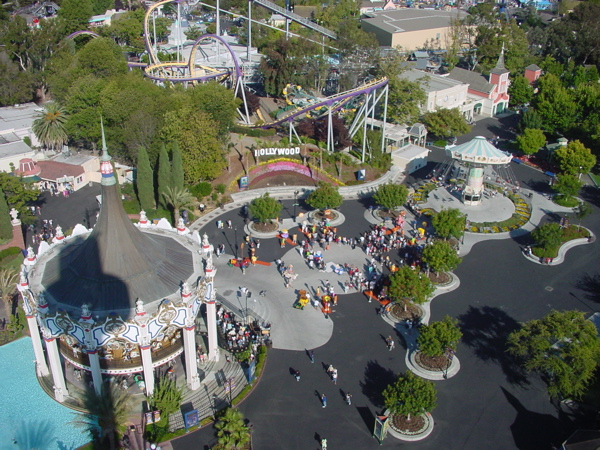
Great America

- Billy Jones Wildcat Railroad, Los Gatos
- California's Great America, Santa Clara (formerly "Paramount's Great America")
- Gilroy Gardens, Gilroy (formerly "Bonfante Gardens")
- Happy Hollow Park & Zoo, Willow Glen (south-central San Jose)
- CaliBunga Waterpark, East San Jose

== Vineyards and wineries ==
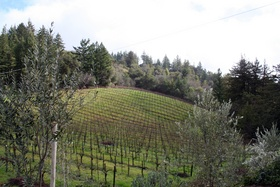
Vineyards in the Santa Cruz Mountains

- Byington Vineyard, Los Gatos
- David Bruce Winery, Los Gatos
- J. Lohr Vineyards and Wines, downtown San Jose
- Mountain Winery, Saratoga
- Picchetti Brothers Winery, Cupertino
- Rabbits Foot Meadery, Sunnyvale
- Savannah-Chanelle Vineyards, Saratoga

== See also ==
- List of museums in the San Francisco Bay Area
- National Register of Historic Places listings in Santa Clara County, California
- Silicon Valley
