= Superstition Meadery =

Beverage company in Prescott, Arizona

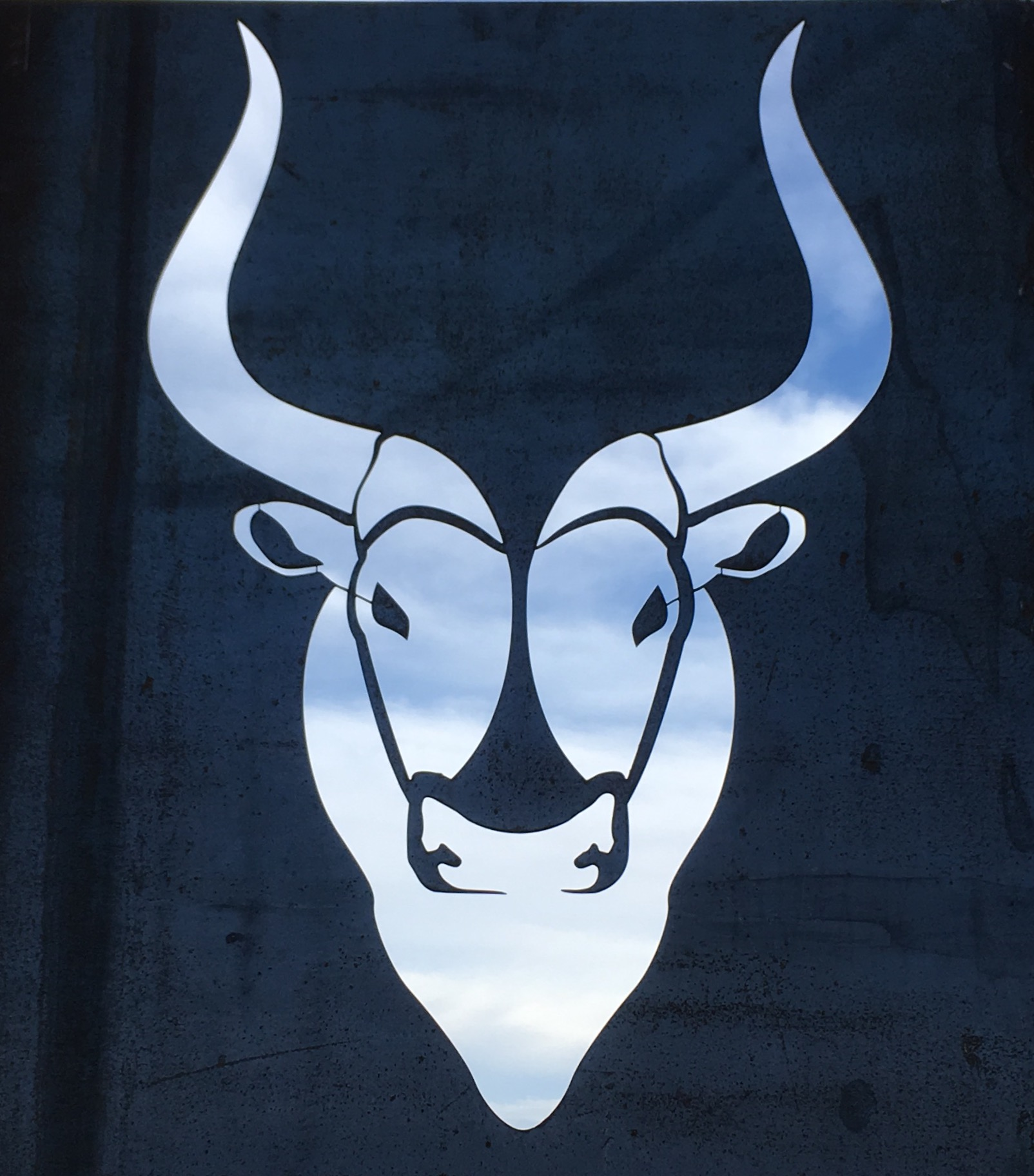
- Superstition Meadery's steel sign outside their production facility
- Interactive map of Superstition Meadery
- Location: 120 W Gurley St, Prescott, Arizona, US Cellar 1
- Coordinates: 34°32′32″N 112°28′10″W
- Opened: 2012
- Owner: Jeff and Jen Herbert
- Website: superstitionmeadery.com

Superstition Meadery is a meadery, winery and cider house founded in 2012 and based in Prescott, Arizona. As of 2016 they produce 6,000 gallons a year. They won four gold medals and one silver at the 2016 Mazer Cup International mead competition. Availability is localized to Arizona through their distribution partnership with Hensley Beverage Company, with additional direct-to-consumer shipping in 40 U.S. states, and account distribution to 25 U.S. states. They also distribute worldwide in Denmark, Thailand, Japan, and Singapore.

== History ==
Owners Jeff and Jen Herbert began making mead as home-brewers around 2007, and began professional production in 2012 when they entered into an alternating proprietorship with Juniper Well Ranch in Skull Valley, Az. The company opened a production facility and tasting room in the cellar of the Burmister Building in Prescott, Az in 2014.

== Business awards ==
In 2019, Superstition was the Arizona Master Award Winner of the Success Awards by The Arizona Small Business Development Center Network (SBDC). Superstition was also recognized as the 2019 Arizona Small Business Persons of the year, where they were invited to Washington D.C. to compete for the award of best small business in the United States. They then went on to be awarded the 2019 SBA Small Business Persons of the Year award in the nation's capitol. Other awards include being the recipients of the ASHy award from the Arizona Society of Homebrewers.

== Mead and cider awards ==
| Year | Recipient | Award |
|---|---|---|
| 2015 | Berry White | Best Overall Arizona Mead/Cider |
| 2014 | Tahitian Honeymoon | Best Mead in Arizona |

Awards from the international Mead Free or Die competition.

| Year | Style | Recipient | Award |
|---|---|---|---|
| 2016 | Stone Fruit | Hera's Orchard | 3rd |
| 2016 | Melomel | Literary Nonsense | 2nd |

Awards from the annual Mazer Cup International.

| Year | Style | Recipient | Award |
|---|---|---|---|
| 2019 | Pyment | Aphrodesia Cuvee | Gold |
| 2019 | Specialty – Semi-Sweet | Contingency: Blanc | Bronze |
| 2018 | Dessert – Semi Sweet | Straw Berry White | Silver |
| 2018 | Melomel – Dry | Gryphon’s Tart Cherry Cyser | Silver |
| 2018 | Specialty – Dry | Lagrimas De Oro | Gold |
| 2018 | Specialty – Semi Sweet | Bourbon Barrel aged Amante | Bronze |
| 2018 | Varietal – Dry | Fauna | Bronze |
| 2017 | Dessert – Semi Sweet | Blue Berry White | Gold |
| 2017 | Melomel – Dry | Hera's Orchard | Silver |
| 2017 | Specialty – Dry | Black Rose | Silver |
| 2017 | Specialty – Semi Sweet | Bourbon Barrel Aged Peanut Butter Jelly Crime | Bronze |
| 2016 | Dessert – Semi Sweet | Black Berry White | Silver |
| 2016 | Melomel – Dry | Marion | Gold |
| 2016 | Melomel – Semi Sweet | Endovelicus | Gold |
| 2016 | Pyment | Aphrodisia | Gold |
| 2016 | Specialty – Semi Sweet | Amante | Gold |
| 2015 | Dessert – Semi Sweet | Blood Eagle | Gold |
| 2015 | Dessert – Sweet | Blue Berry White | Bronze |
| 2015 | Pyment | Aphrodisia | Silver |
| 2015 | Varietal – Sweet | Super Bee | Gold |
| 2014 | Dessert – Sweet | Berry White | Gold |
| 2014 | Pyment | Aphrodisia | Silver |
| 2014 | Traditional – Sweet | Ragnarok | Silver |
| 2013 | Specialty – Dry | Lagrimas De Oro | Silver |

== Product line ==
Superstition's product line features over 85 different meads, "including brews created with blackberries, Belgian dark candi sugar and vanilla beans, all predominantly aged in American oak, as well as bourbon, wine, craft beer and port barrels." Staples include traditional meads like Lagrimas de Oro (a semi-sweet traditional mead), melomels like the berry-based Marion and mango-based Ragnarok, a vanilla metheglin called Tahitian Honeymoon, and grape-based pyments like Aphrodisia. Superstition also produces heavier dessert meads, like the White Series: barrel aged meads with one of four berry juices and white chocolate.

== See also ==
- Arizona wine
- List of cider brands
- Mead in the United States
