= Homer Brewing Company =

Brewery in Alaska, United States

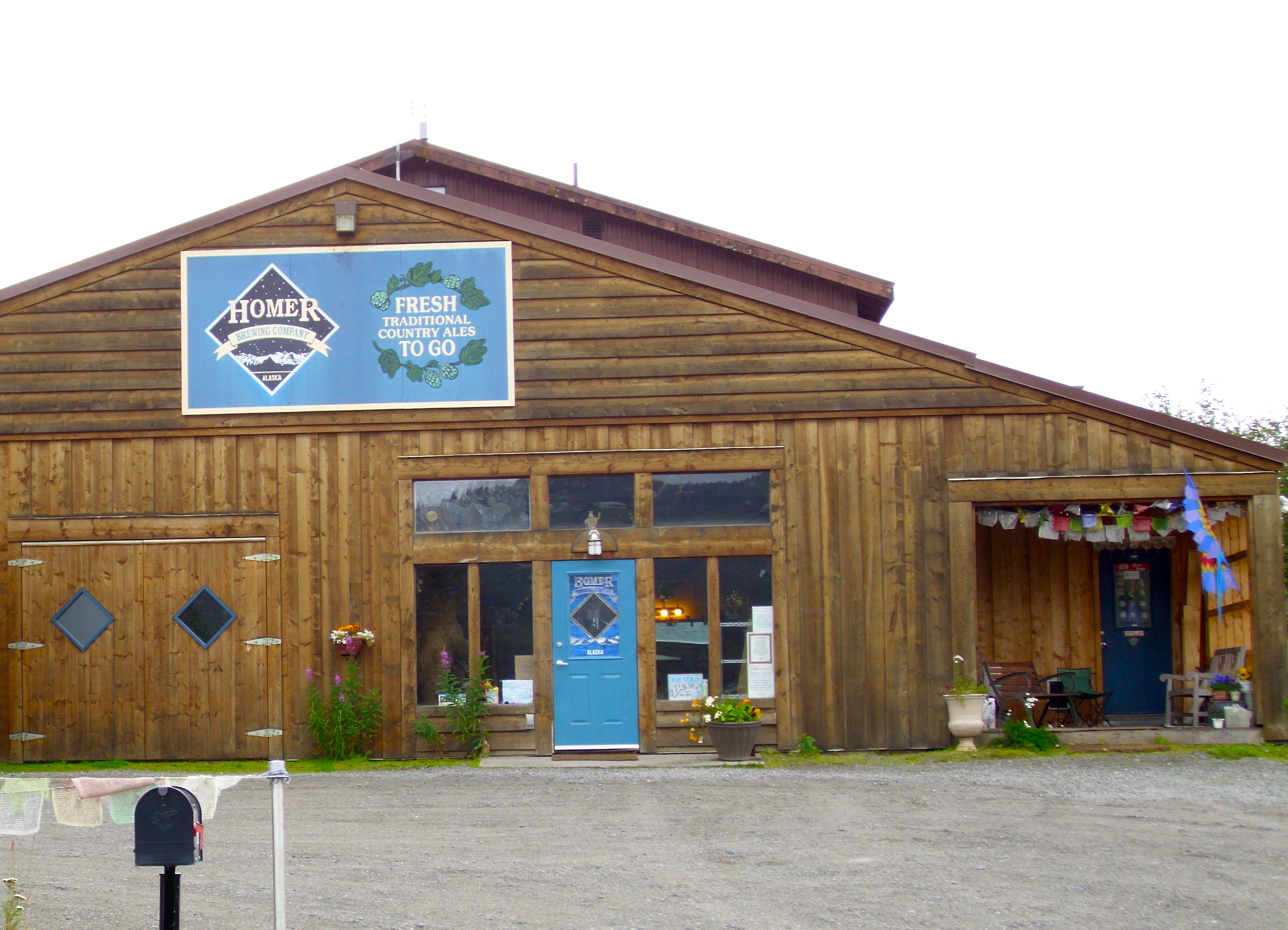
- Interactive map of Homer Brewing Company
- Location: 1411 Lake Shore Drive, Homer, Alaska, United States
- Coordinates: 59°38′25″N 151°30′24″W
- Opened: September 21, 1996

Active beers
| Name | Type |
| Old Inlet Pale | American pale ale |
| Broken Birch Bitter | Bitter |
| Red Knot Scottish | Scottish ale |
| China Poot Porter | Porter |
| Odyssey Oatmeal Stout | Stout |

Seasonal beers
| Name | Type |
| King & Wing ESB | Extra Special Bitter |
| Oktoberfest | Lager |
| Celestiale | Belgian-style spiced ale |
| Royal Imperial Stout | Stout |

The Homer Brewing Company is a brewery in Homer, Alaska, near the southern end of the Kenai Peninsula. It was founded on September 21, 1996. The brewery specializes in unfiltered, unpasteurized, cask-conditioned beers. Their beers are available in 64 US fl oz (1,900 ml) growlers, 20 US fl oz (590 ml) bottles and on tap in many local establishments.

Along with a winery, and Grace Ridge Brewing Co., it serves a town with a 2010 population of 5,003 people.

== See also ==
- List of Alaska breweries
