= List of breweries in Alaska =

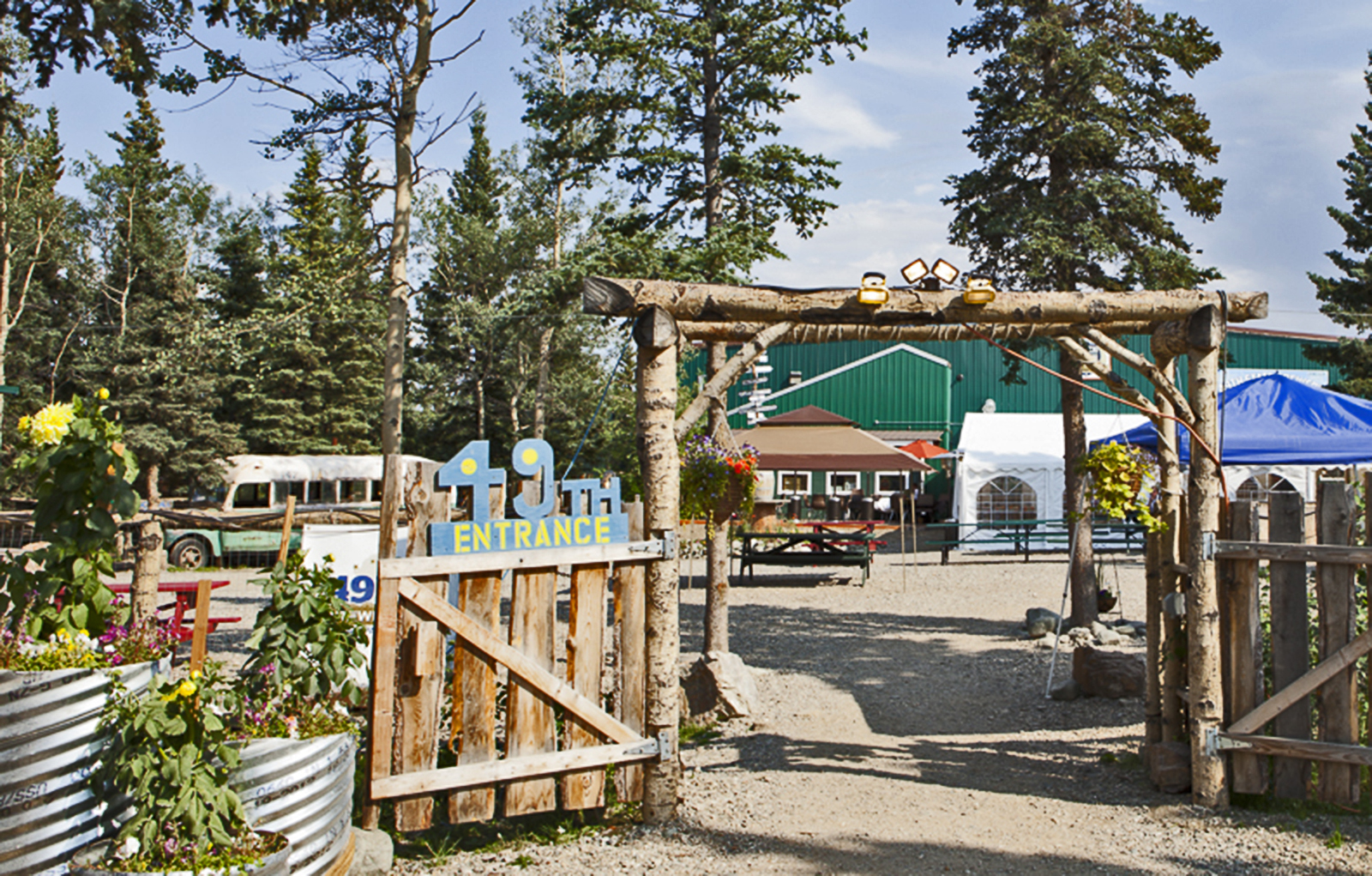
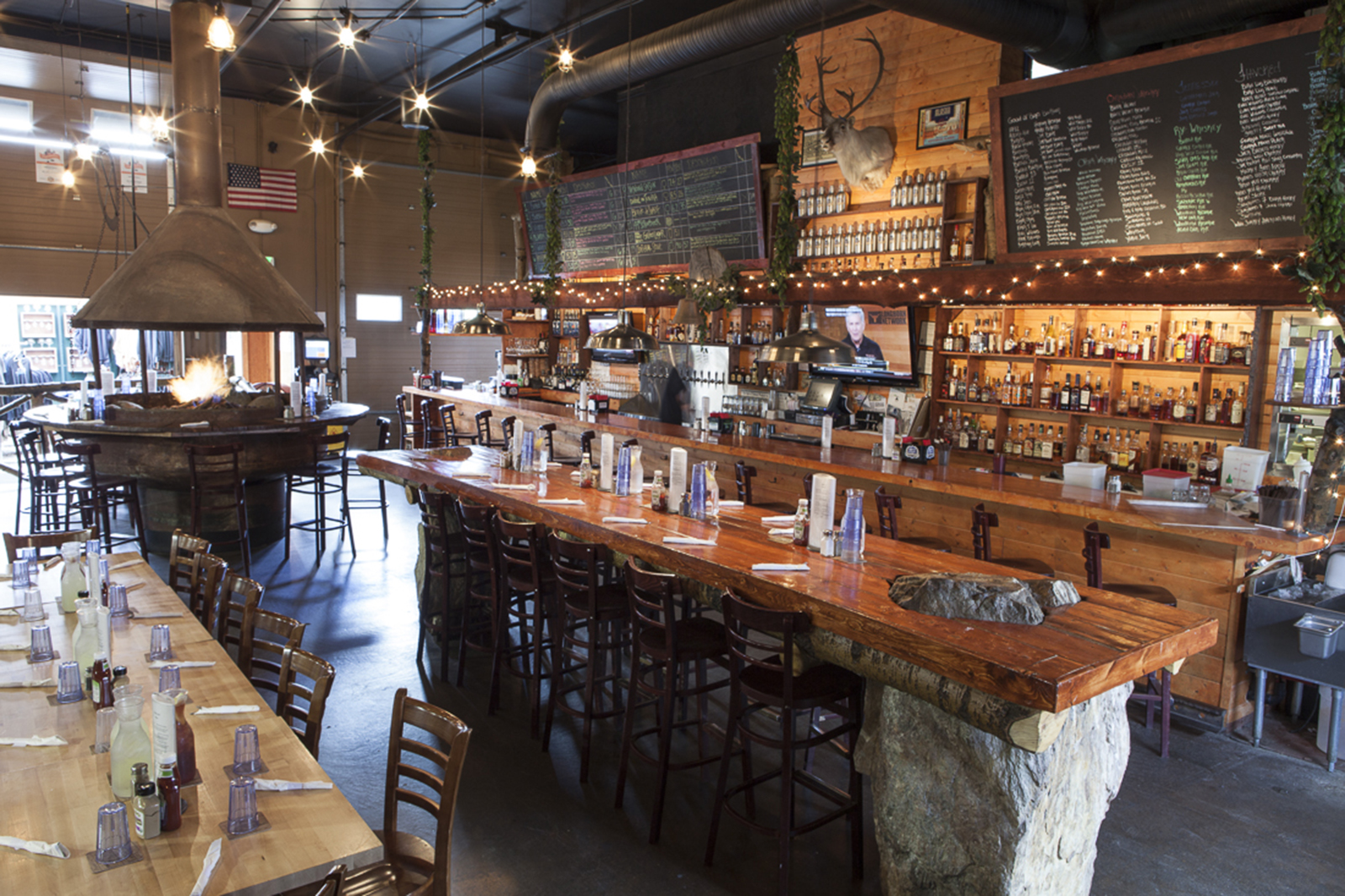
Entrance to the 49th State - Denali and their massive beer garden and interior of the brew pub.
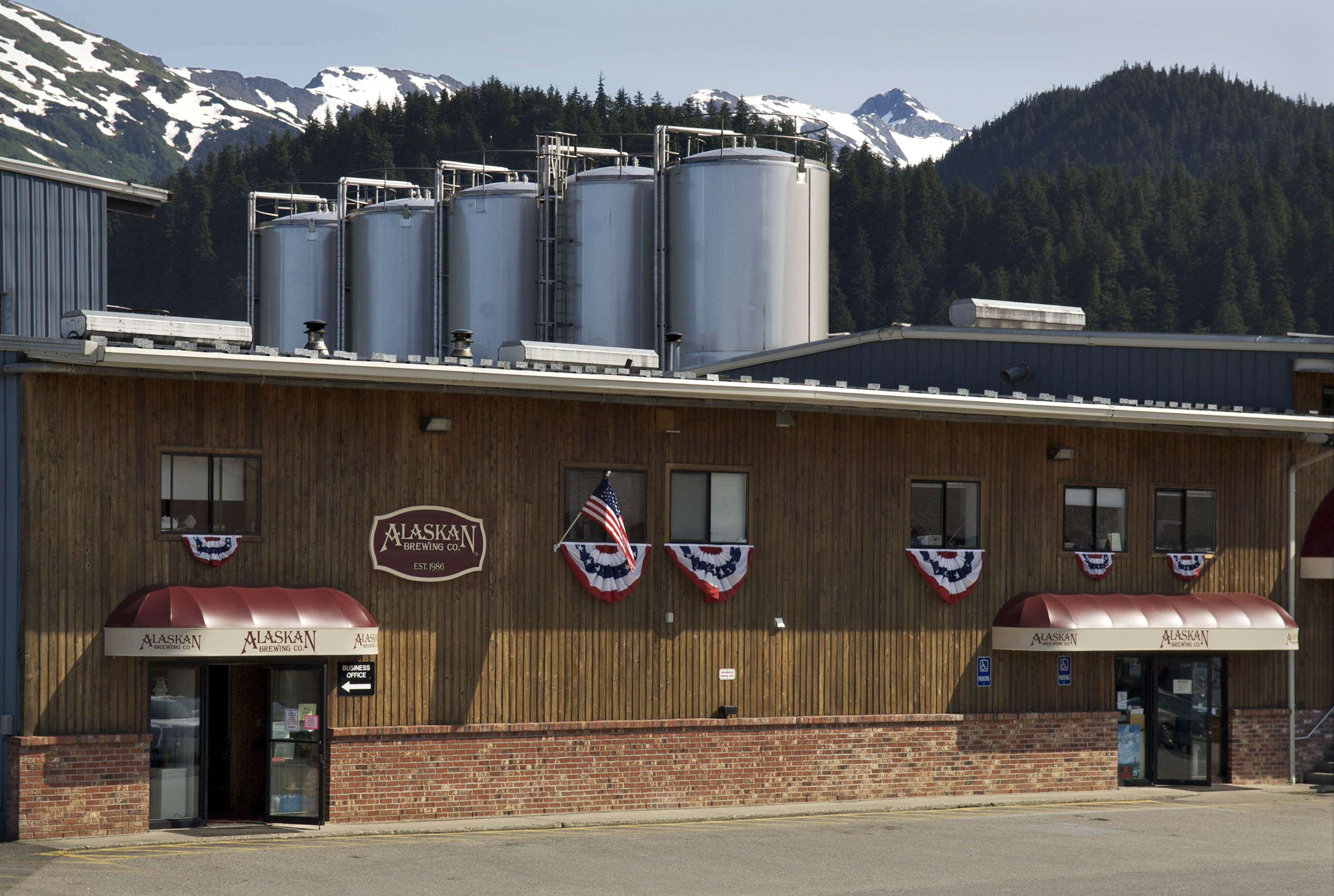
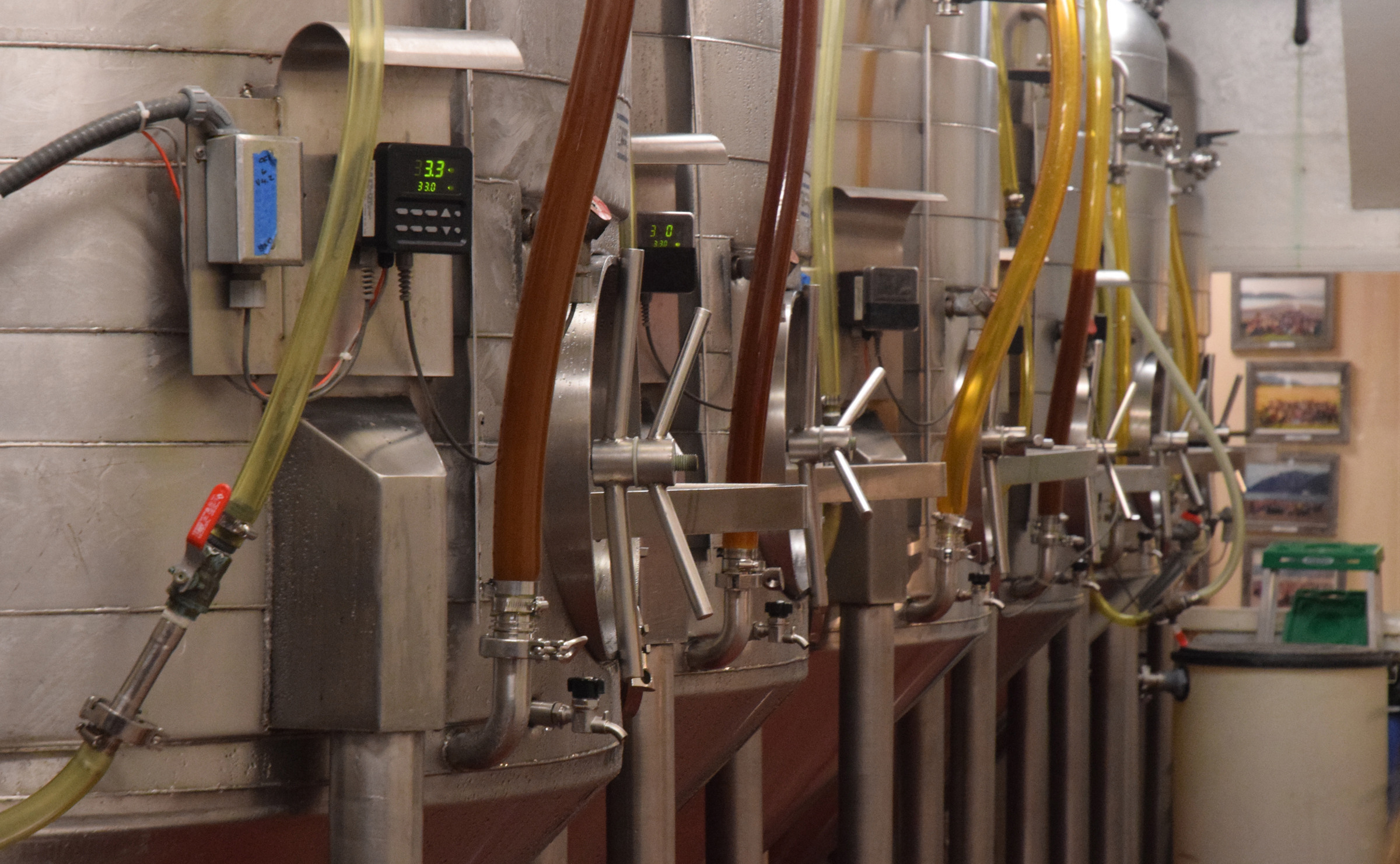
Exterior and interior views of Alaska's largest brewery, the Alaskan Brewing Company, located in the Lemon Creek neighborhood of Juneau.

Breweries in Alaska produce a wide range of beers in different styles that are marketed locally, regionally, and nationally. In 2012, Alaska's 21 breweries, importers, brewpubs, packagers, and wholesalers employed more than 250 people directly in brewing activities, and another 2200 in related jobs such as wholesaling and retailing. Including people directly employed in brewing, as well as those who supply Alaska's breweries with everything from ingredients to machinery, the total business and personal tax revenue generated by Alaska's breweries and related industries was more than $73 million. Consumer purchases of Alaska's brewery products generated another $23 million in tax revenue. In 2012, according to the Brewers Association, Alaska ranked 4th in per capita craft breweries with 22.

For context, at the end of 2013 there were 2,822 breweries in the United States, including 2,768 craft breweries. In that same year, according to the Beer Institute, the brewing industry employed around 43,000 Americans in brewing and distribution and had a combined economic impact of more than $246 billion.

Since the turn of the century, the number of craft breweries in Alaska has increased dramatically, reflecting a nationwide trend in the United States.

Alaskan breweries struggle with strict liquor regulations that keep their onsite sales limited to 36 ounces per person per day, closing times at 9pm and disallow TVs, gaming and live entertainment. Some breweries like the 49th State Brewing Company, Matanuska Brewing, and now Anchorage Brewing have picked up more extensive liquor licenses to get around the red tape

== Breweries ==
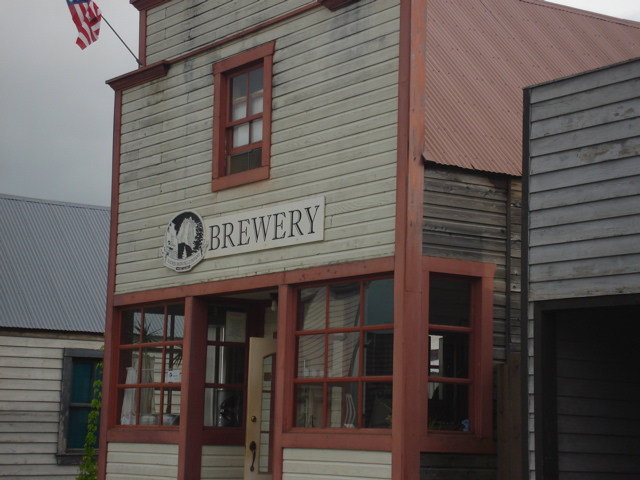
Haines Brewing Company

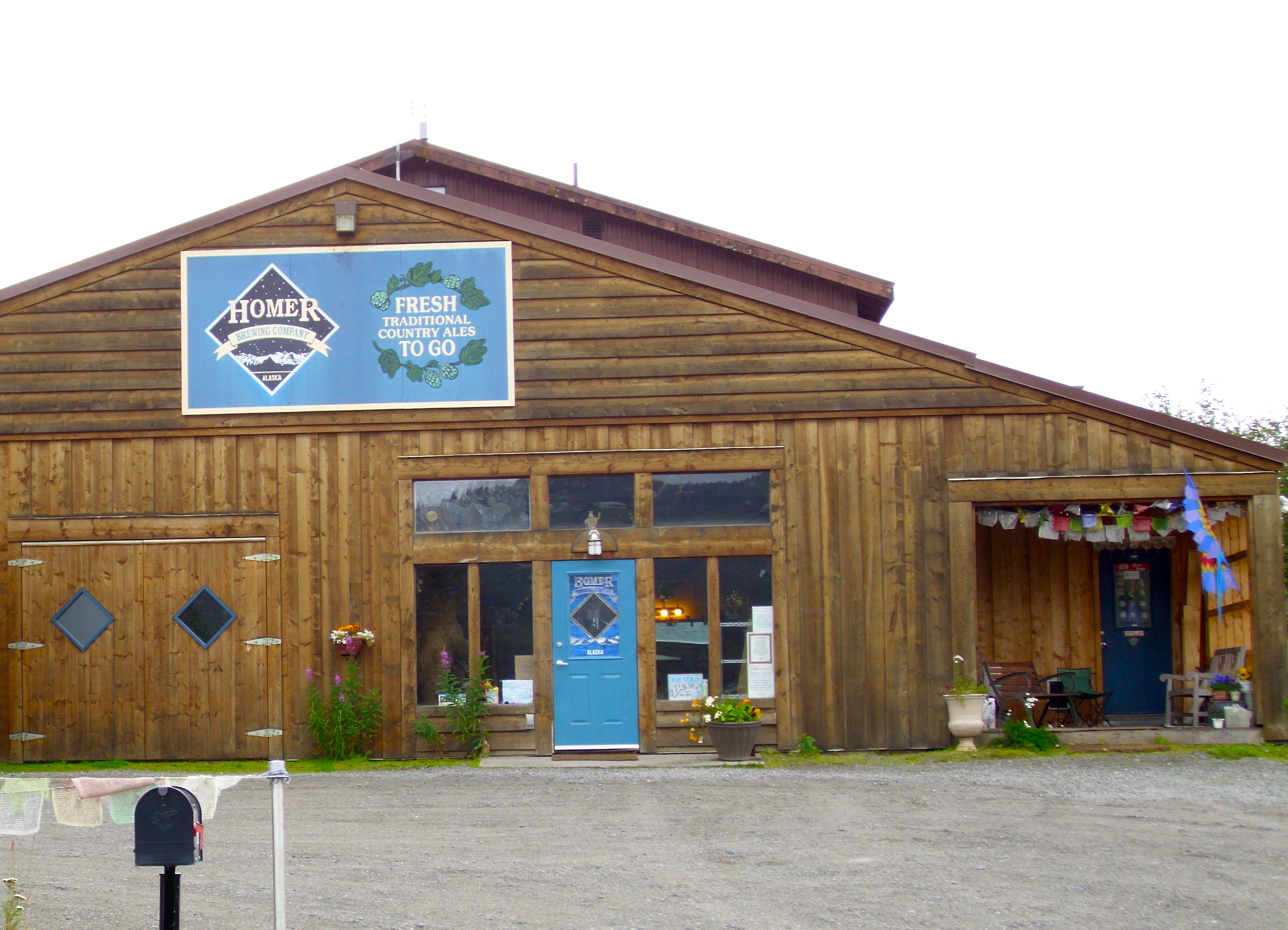
Homer Brewing Company

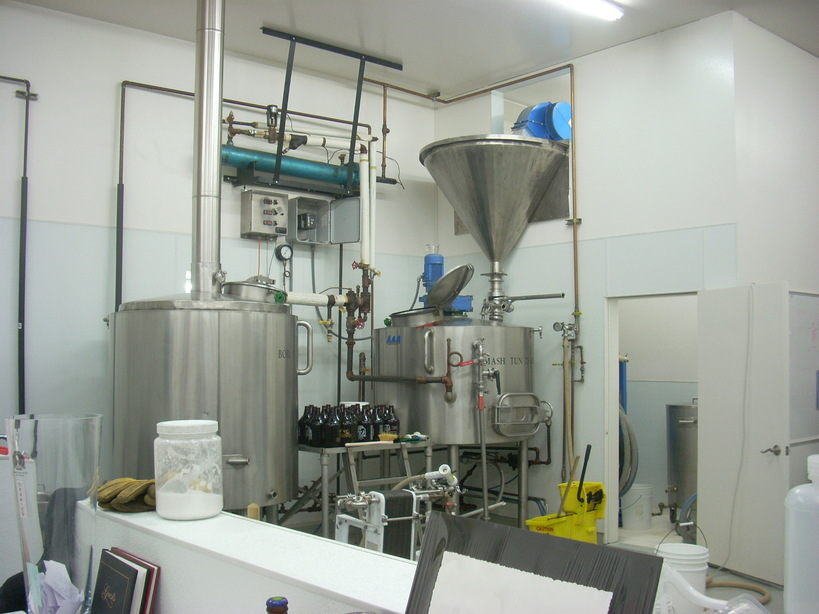
Kassik's Kenai Brew Stop

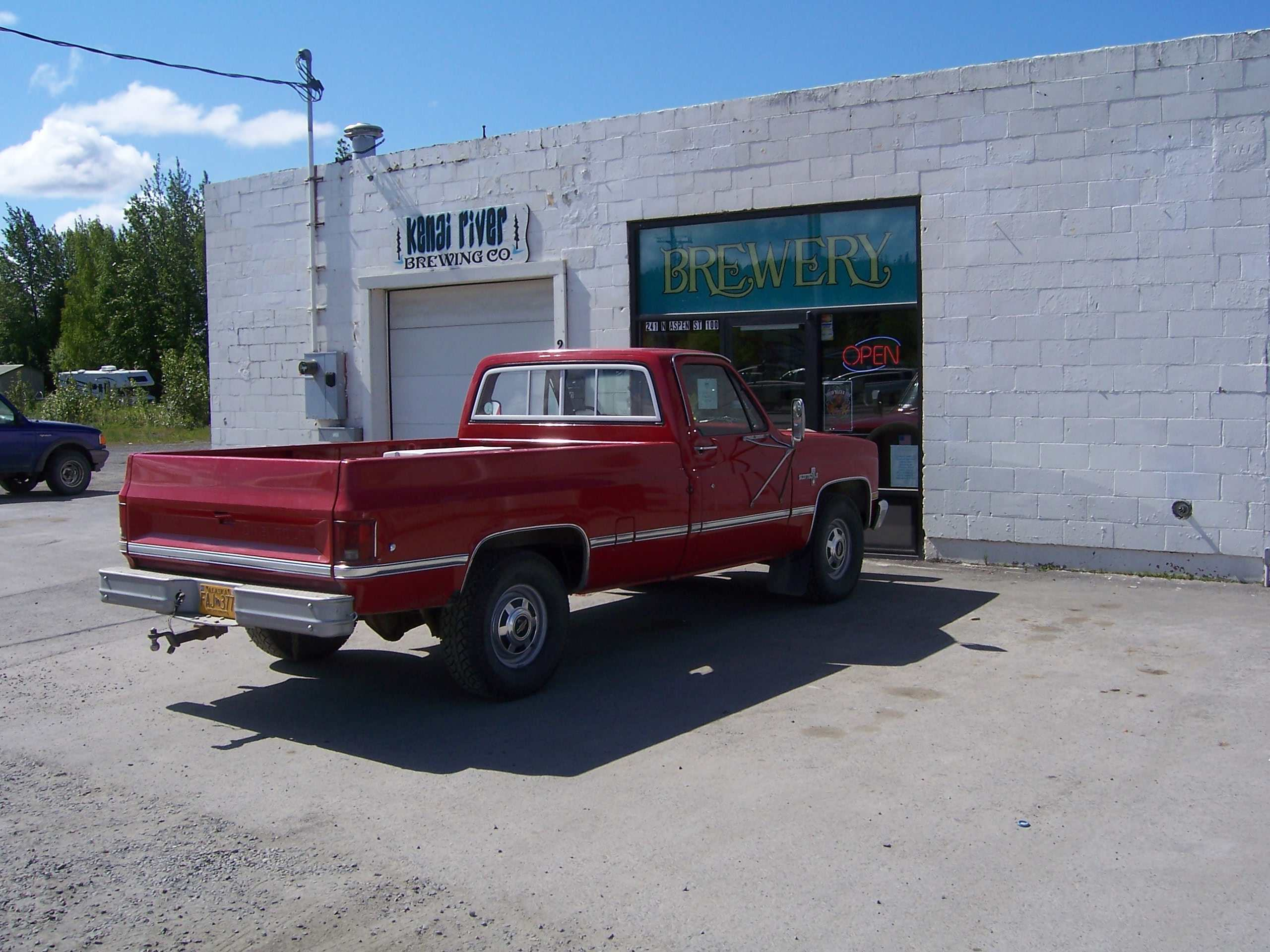
Kenai River Brewing Company

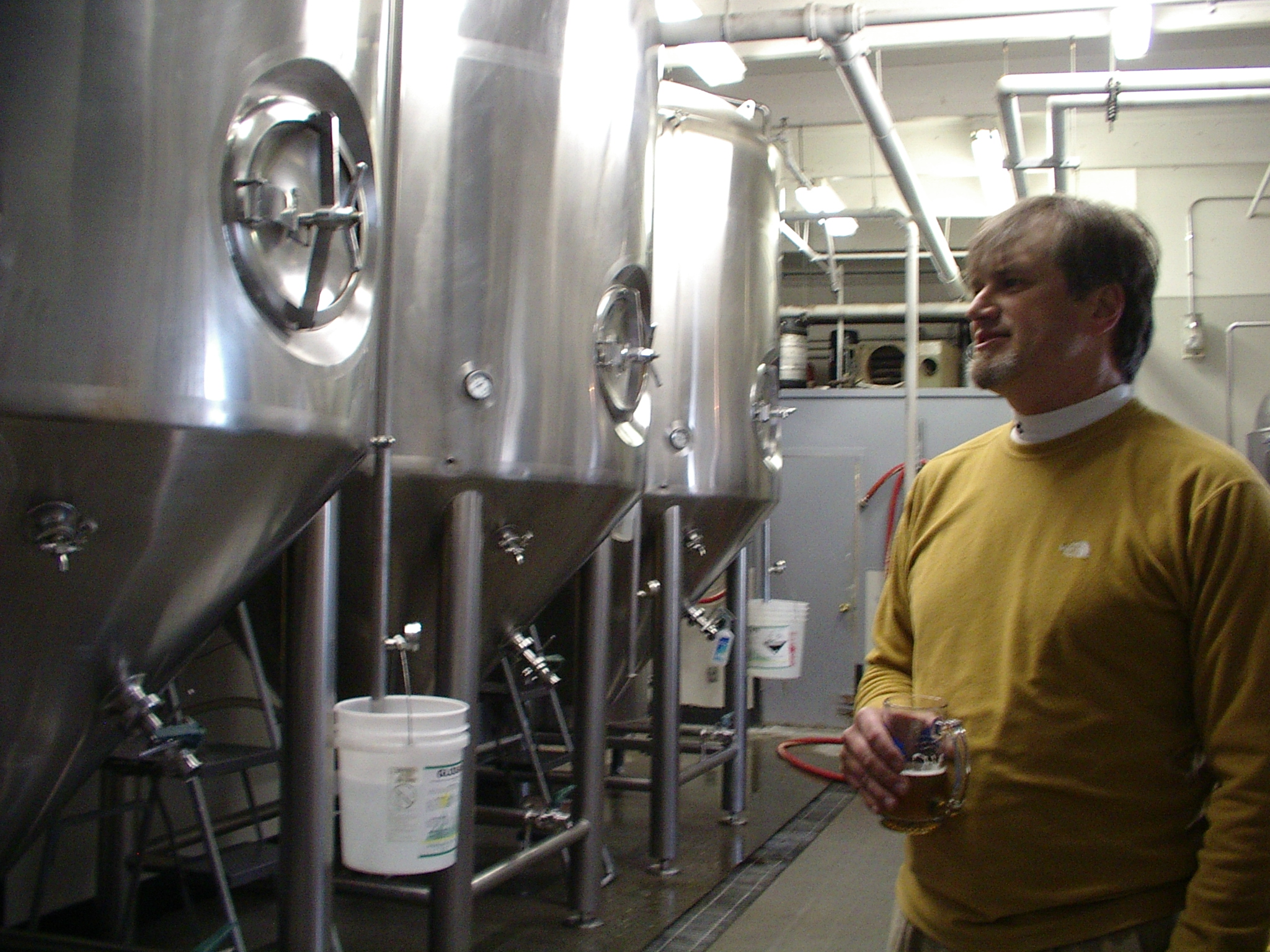
Midnight Sun Brewing Company

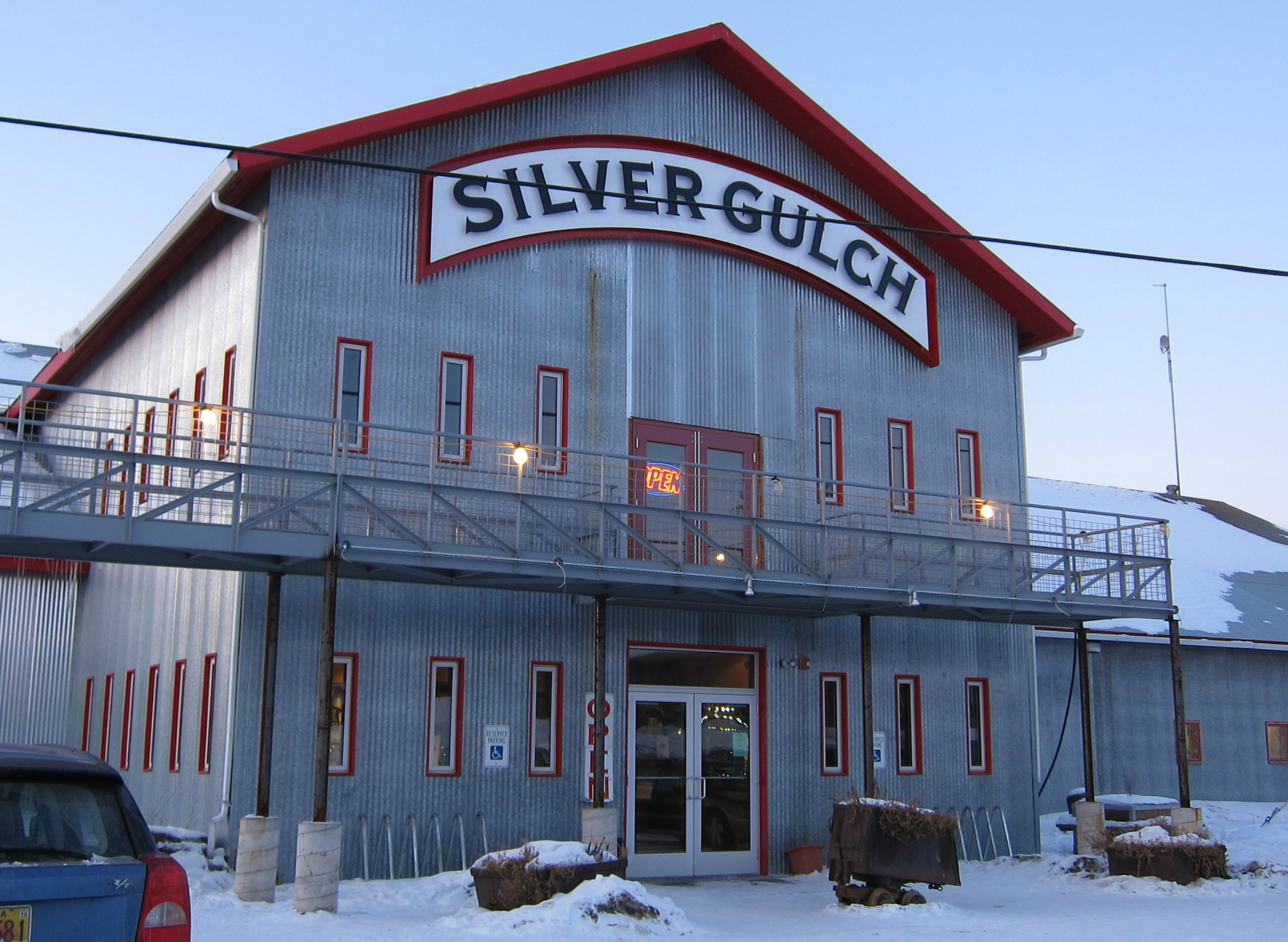
Silver Gulch Brewing & Bottling Company

=== Operating breweries ===
- 49th State Brewing Company (est. 2010) – Healy and Anchorage
- Alaskan Brewing Company (est. 1986) – Juneau
- Anchorage Brewing Company (est. 2010) – Anchorage
- Arkose Brewery (est. 2011) – Palmer
- Baleen Brewing Company (est. 2012) - Ketchikan
- Barnaby Brewing Company (est. 2017) - Juneau
- Bawden Street Brewing Company (est. 2018) - Ketchikan
- Bearpaw River Brewing Company (est. 2015) – Wasilla
- Black Spruce Brewing Company (est. 2018) - Fairbanks
- Bleeding Heart Brewery (est. 2016) – Palmer
- Brewerks (est. 2021) - Anchorage
- Broken Tooth Brewing (est. 1996) – Anchorage
- Cooper Landing Brewing Company (est. 2017) - Cooper Landing
- Copper River Brewing (est. 2022) - Cordova
- Cynosure Brewing (est. 2016) – Anchorage
- Denali Brewing Company (est. 2009) – Talkeetna
- Devil's Club Brewing Company (est. 2018) - Juneau
- Forbidden Peak Brewery (est. 2019) - Juneau
- Gakona Brewery & Supply Company (est. 2015) – Gakona
- Girdwood Brewing Company (est. 2017) - Girdwood
- Glacier Brewhouse (est. 1996) – Anchorage
- Grace Ridge Brewing (est. 2016) – Homer
- Growler Bay Brewing Company (est. 2020) - Valdez
- Haines Brewing Company (est. 1999) – Haines
- Harbor Mountain Brewing Company (est. 2020) - Sitka
- Homer Brewing Company (est. 1996) – Homer
- HooDoo Brewing Company (est. 2012) – Fairbanks
- Icy Strait Brewing (est. 2015) – Hoonah
- Kassik's Kenai Brew Stop (est. 2006) – Nikiski
- Kenai River Brewing Company (est. 2006) – Soldotna
- King Street Brewing Company (est. 2010) – Anchorage
- Klondike Brewing Company (est. 2018) - Skagway
- Kodiak Island Brewing Company (est. 2003) – Kodiak
- Last Frontier Brewing Company (est. 2010) – Wasilla
- Latitude 65 Brewing Company (est. 2021) - Fairbanks
- Lazy Mountain Brewing Company (est. 2019) — Palmer
- Matanuska Brewing Company (est. 2018) - Palmer
- Midnight Sun Brewing Company (est. 1995) – Anchorage
- Midnight Mine Brewing Company (est. 2019) - Fairbanks
- Odd Man Rush Brewing (est. 2015) – Eagle River
- Olds River Brewing Company (est. 2020) - Kodiak
- Raven's Ring Brewing Company (est. 2022) - Anchorage
- Roughwoods Inn & Café (est. 2013) - Nenana
- Seward Brewing Company (est. 2014) – Seward
- Silver Gulch Brewing & Bottling Company (est. 1998) – Fox
- Skagway Brewing Company – Skagway
- St. Elias Brewing Company (est. 2007) – Soldotna
- Stoney Creek Brewhouse (est. 2021) - Seward
- Susitna Brewing Company (est. 2022) - Big Lake
- Turnagain Brewing (est. 2018) - Anchorage
- Valdez Brewing (est. 2019) - Valdez

=== Closed breweries ===
- Alaska Brewing Company (1900-1901) - Nome
- Arctic Brewing (1907-1910) – Fairbanks
- Baranof Island Brewing Company (2010-2019) – Sitka
- Barthel Brewing Company (1905-1919) – Fairbanks
- Douglas City Brewing Company (1902-1906) - Douglas
- Eagle Brewing Company (1904-1906) - Eagle
- Fairbanks Brewing (1906-1907) – Fairbanks
- Gold Rush Brewing (2010-2017) - Skagway
- Juneau Brewing and Malting Company (1900-1904) - Juneau
- Pioneer Brewing Company (1934-1937) – Fairbanks
- Prinz Brau (1976-1979) – Anchorage
- Railway Brewing Company (1996-1998) - Anchorage
- Ravens Ridge (1994-1995) – Fairbanks
- Regal Eagle Brewing (1995-2003) - Eagle River
- Resolution Brewing Company (2015-2021) - Anchorage
- Skagway Brewing Company (1897-1902) - Skagway
- Sleeping Lady Brewing Company (1996-2015) – Anchorage
- Quake Brewing Company (2016-2017) - Wasilla
- Valdez Brewing Company (1903-1909) - Valdez

== See also ==
- Beer in the United States
- List of breweries in the United States
- List of microbreweries
- Mead in Alaska
