= Mead in the United States =

Contributor product to the U.S. alcohol industry

Mead, a fermented honey beverage, was a minimally significant contributor to the United States alcohol industry until the late 20th century, at which time a craft industry for mead began to grow. From approximately the 1980s onward, small-scale meaderies began to increase in number, with a marked jump in interest evident by the 2010s.

== History ==
Mead was not a commonly manufactured alcoholic beverage in the United States before the 1980s. It was mostly unknown to the general public or was thought of as a historical curiosity associated with the medieval era, and there was little variety in recipe to drive consumer interest. A small number of special-interest manufacturers made mead starting in the 1960s. One early manufacturer was Bargetto Winery in California, whose Chaucer's Mead was manufactured from the 1960s, and another was Lingamore Winecellars, a Maryland-based winery that began making mead in 1978; initially, both were manufacturing primarily to supply Renaissance festivals. Interest in mead began to increase alongside the growth of the home brewing market, especially after the publication of Charlie Papazian's The Complete Joy of Home Brewing in 1984. Some of the strategies employed by craft brewers to add distinctive flavors and aromas to their recipes were adopted by mead makers as well; as Imbibe magazine notes, "many meaderies are taking cues from craft brewing and dry-hopping meads, selling them in growlers and on draft, and aging them in oak barrels that once contained wine, bourbon or, fittingly, imperial stouts." The boom in wine enthusiasm and the local foods movement also coincided with, and may have helped fuel, mead's rise in visibility. Between 2008 and 2011 the number of participants in the Mazer Cup more than doubled, from 100 to 218, an indicator of the rising economic footprint of the drink. There were about 60 commercial meaderies in the United States in 2003, and 200 in 2012. 2012 marked the establishment of the American Mead Makers Association, a trade and industry group for mead manufacturers. By 2020, approximately 500 small-scale mead manufacturers were operating in the United States.

== Regions ==
Mead-making operations are now present in most American states. Michigan is one of the most prominent mead-producing states; Esquire remarks that the state "could very well be mead's mecca [in the US]." Due to the minimal amount of water necessary for mead making, Arizona is also a prominent mead-making state; the state's central valleys play host to wildflower blooms that have attracted mead makers, and it is the home state of Drinking Horn Meadery in Flagstaff and Superstition Meadery. California, the home state of Rabbits Foot Meadery, also has many mead-making businesses, especially in the greater Bay Area. Colorado plays host annually to the Mazer Cup, an international awards competition for mead. Some meaderies in the United States have explored cross-cultural mead recipes, pairing with meaderies in other countries, such as Ireland, South Africa, and Brazil.

== Regulation ==
Because of the patchwork of state laws regulating the production and sale of alcoholic beverages (an outgrowth of the 21st Amendment, which ended the Prohibition Era and returned liquor regulation to the control of each U.S. state), there are often substantial difficulties in obtaining the necessary licenses and permissions to start a commercial meadery and ship the product in certain states. Meaderies must also obtain a license from the federal government to operate. Federal food and beverage regulations classify mead in the same category as wine, which has made some manufacturing and labeling decisions difficult for meadmakers. The federal regulations also make no differentiation between different styles or varieties of mead.

== See also ==
- Mead in Alaska
