= Mead in Alaska =

Mead, an alcoholic beverage made by fermenting a solution of honey and water, is made in Alaska among other places. Because Alaska has no indigenous pollinators that produce honey, local honey is expensive, causing most Alaskan mead to be made from imported honey.

== Active meaderies ==
- Alaska Meadery
- Hive Mind Meadery
- Odin
- Sweetgale Meadworks & Cider House

== Defunct meaderies ==
- Celestial Meads
- Ring of Fire Meadery
- Two Seasons Meadery

== See also ==
- List of Alaska breweries
- Mead in the United States
