= Japanese Friendship Garden (San Jose) =

Walled section of Kelley Park in San Jose, California, United States

Coordinates: 37°19′20″N 121°51′40″W

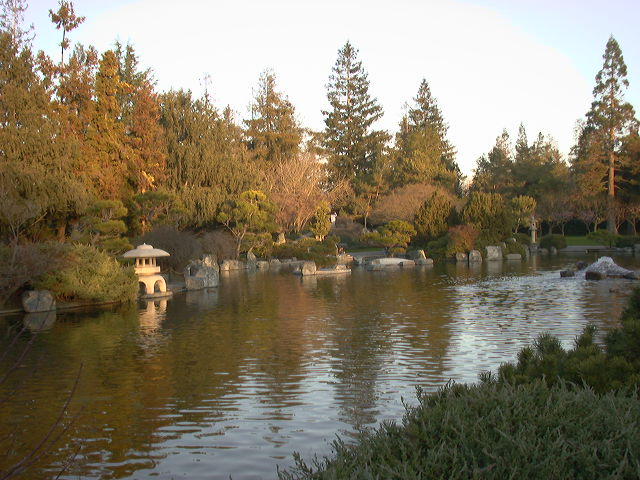
Upper pond

The Japanese Friendship Garden is a walled section of Kelley Park in San Jose, California, United States. Dedicated in October 1965, it is patterned after Japan's famous Korakuen Garden in Okayama (one of San Jose's sister cities) and spans six acres. Its three main ponds were stocked with koi sent from Okayama in 1966. The ponds are at different elevations in the park, and are inter-connected by streams.

The park is open daily from 10 AM to 7 PM. There is no admission fee, but the city does charge for parking at Kelley Park.

== History ==
In 2009 a deadly fish virus killed 90% of the Koi in the ponds.

In 2017 the Coyote Creek flooded the Japanese Friendship Gardens submerging the lower pond and most of the tea house. The main pumps for the three Koi ponds were damaged. The tea house and park's restrooms remained closed to the public pending repairs. As of 2022, the tea house is repaired, while other repairs from the flood remain incomplete.

== Gallery ==
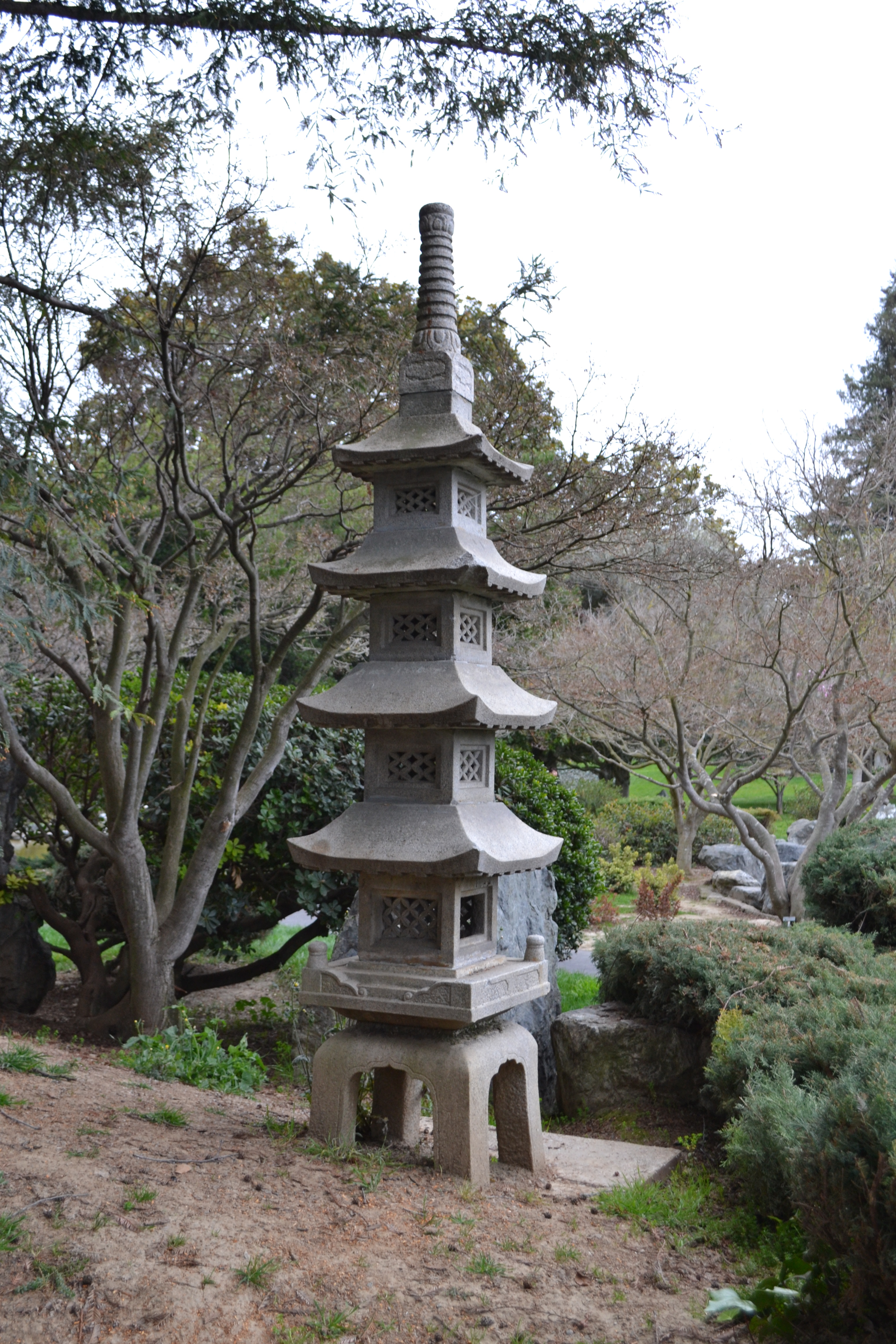
A pagoda in the garden

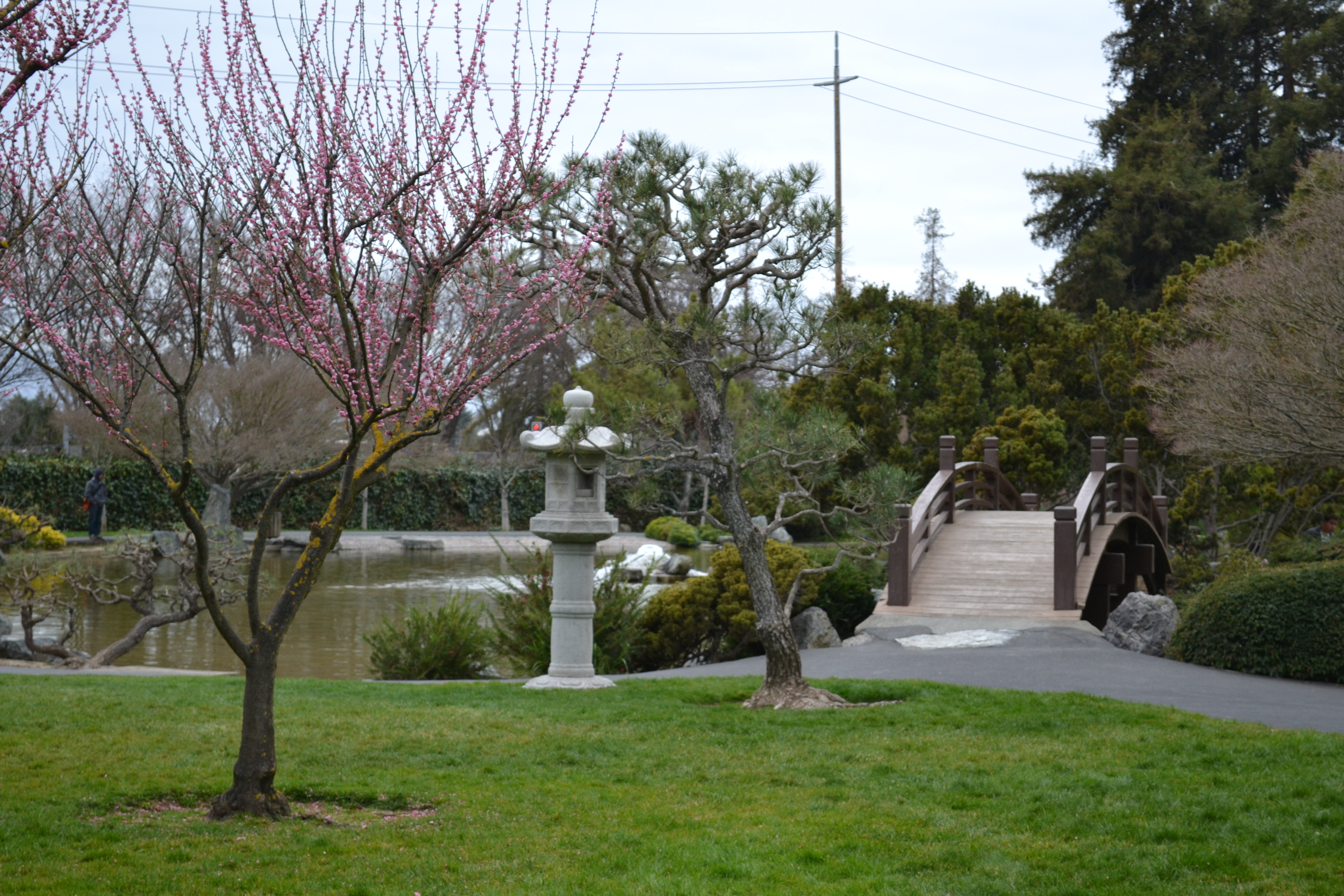
The garden around the upper pond

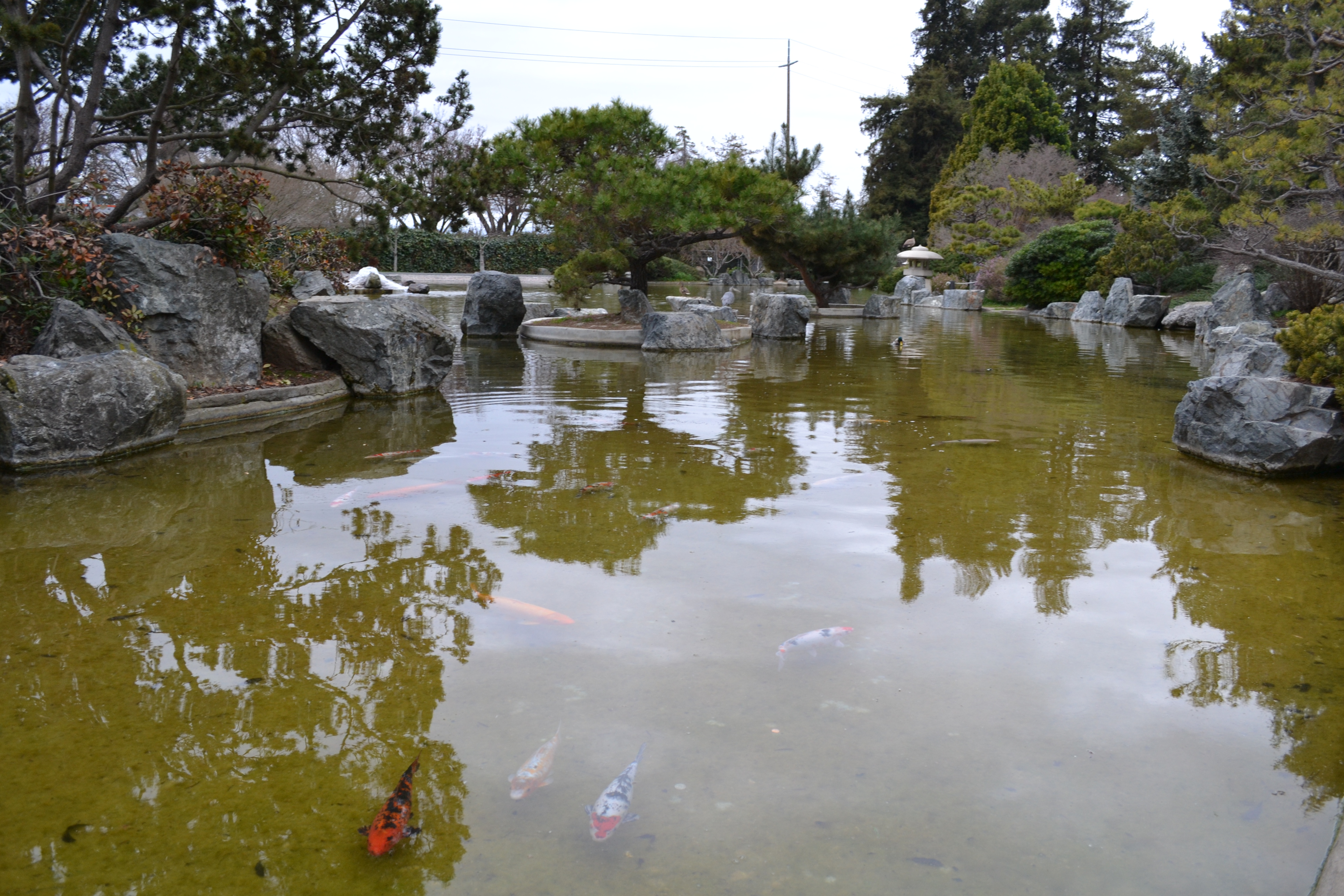
Koi fish in the upper pond

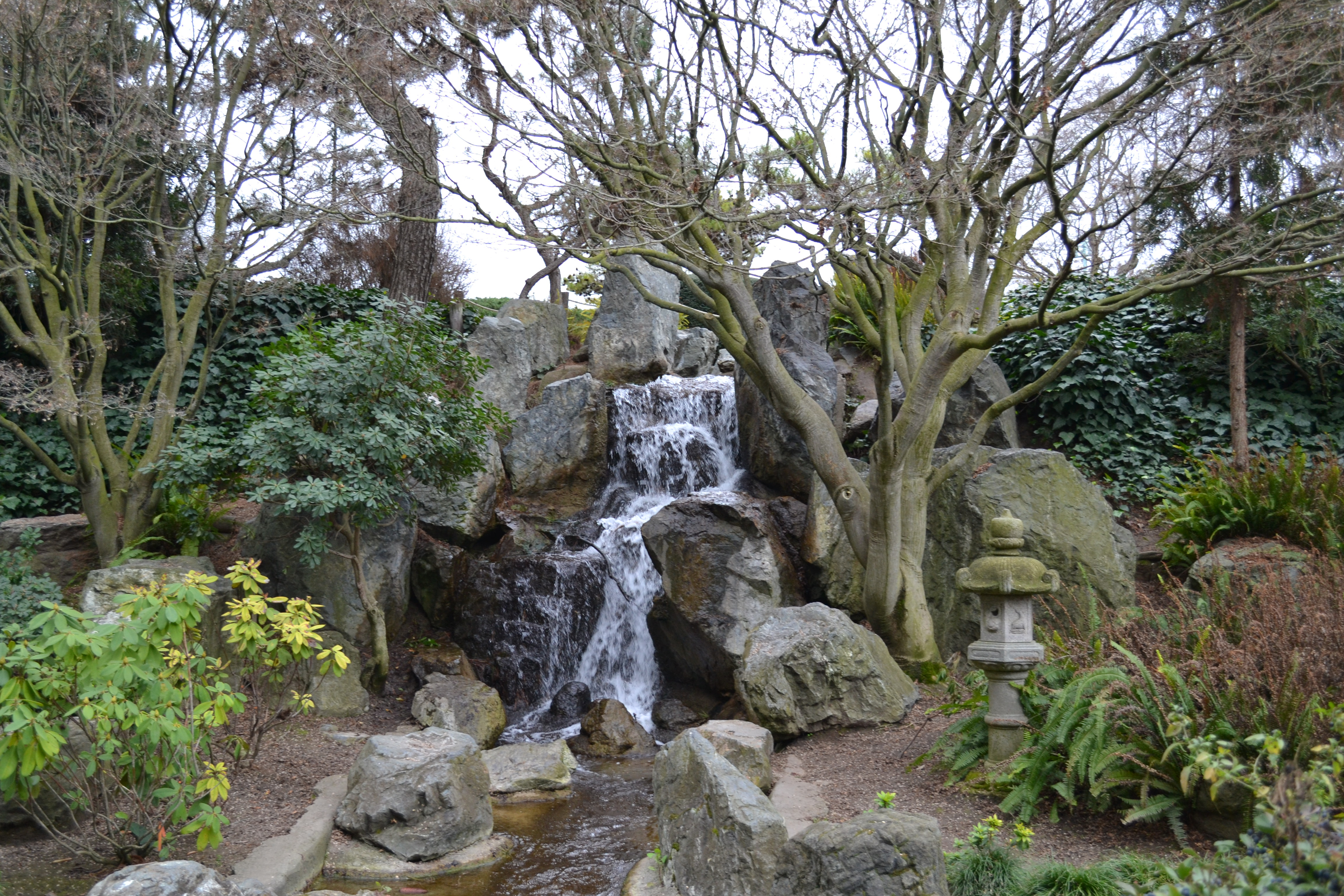
Waterfall between ponds

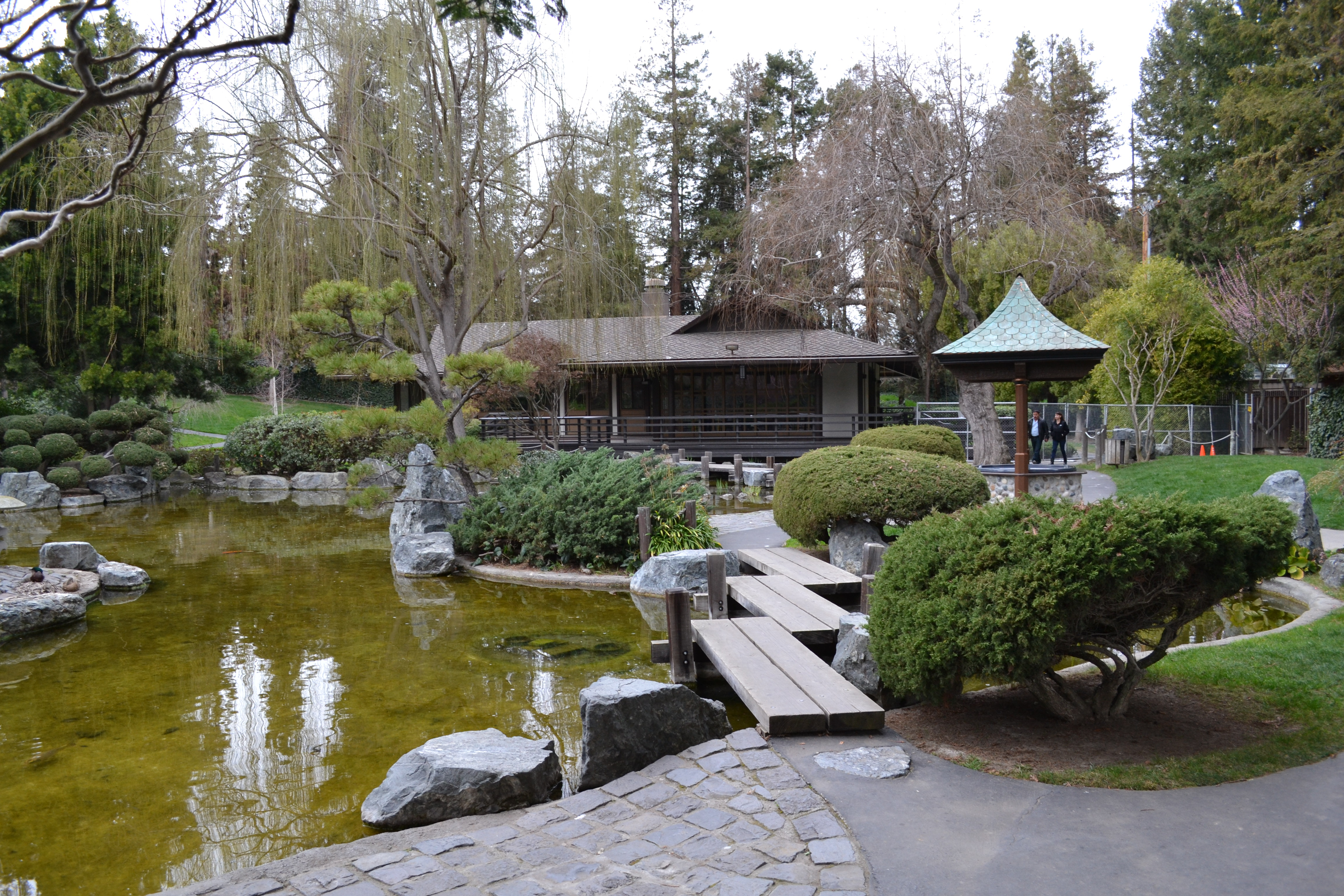
Lower pond

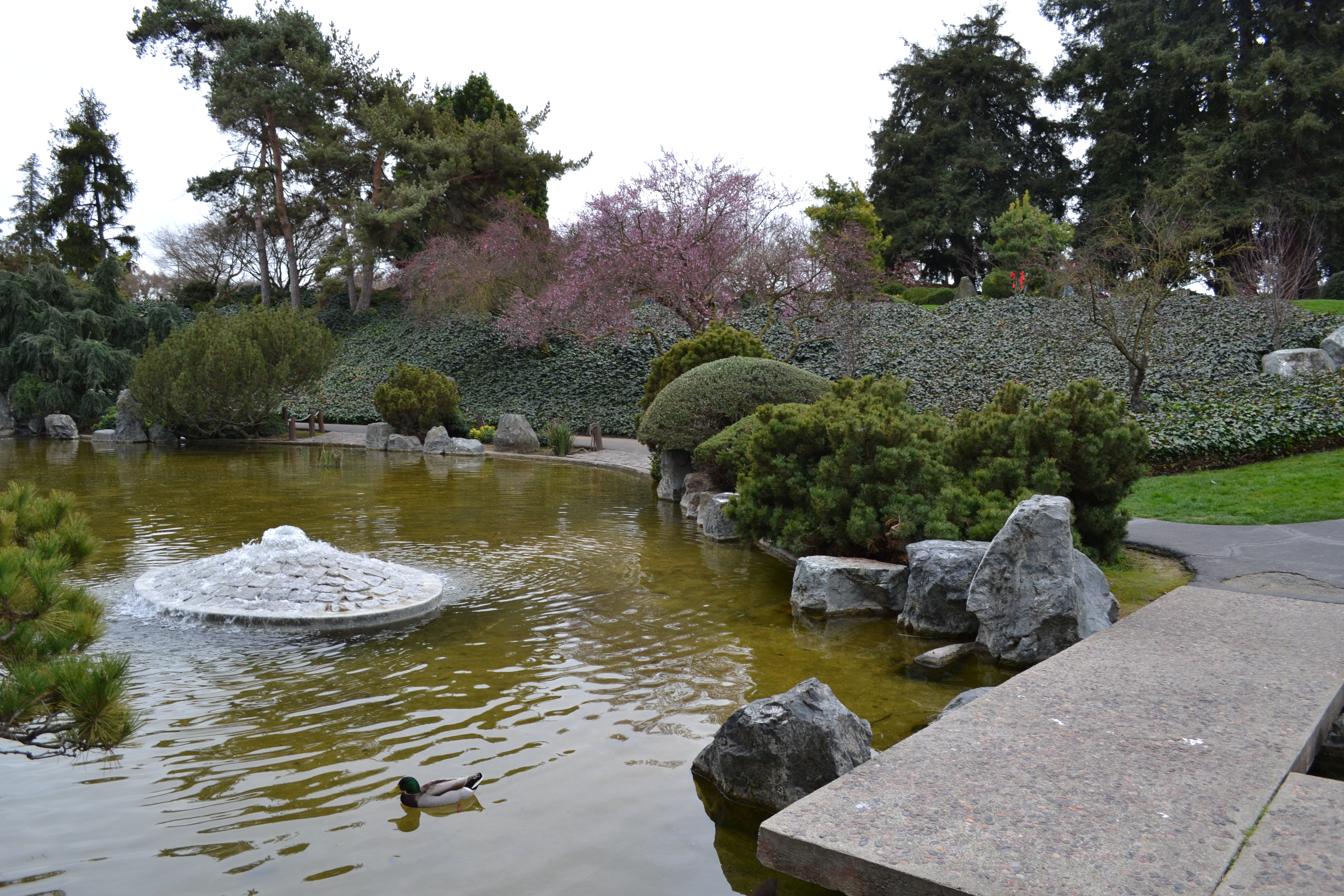
Lower pond

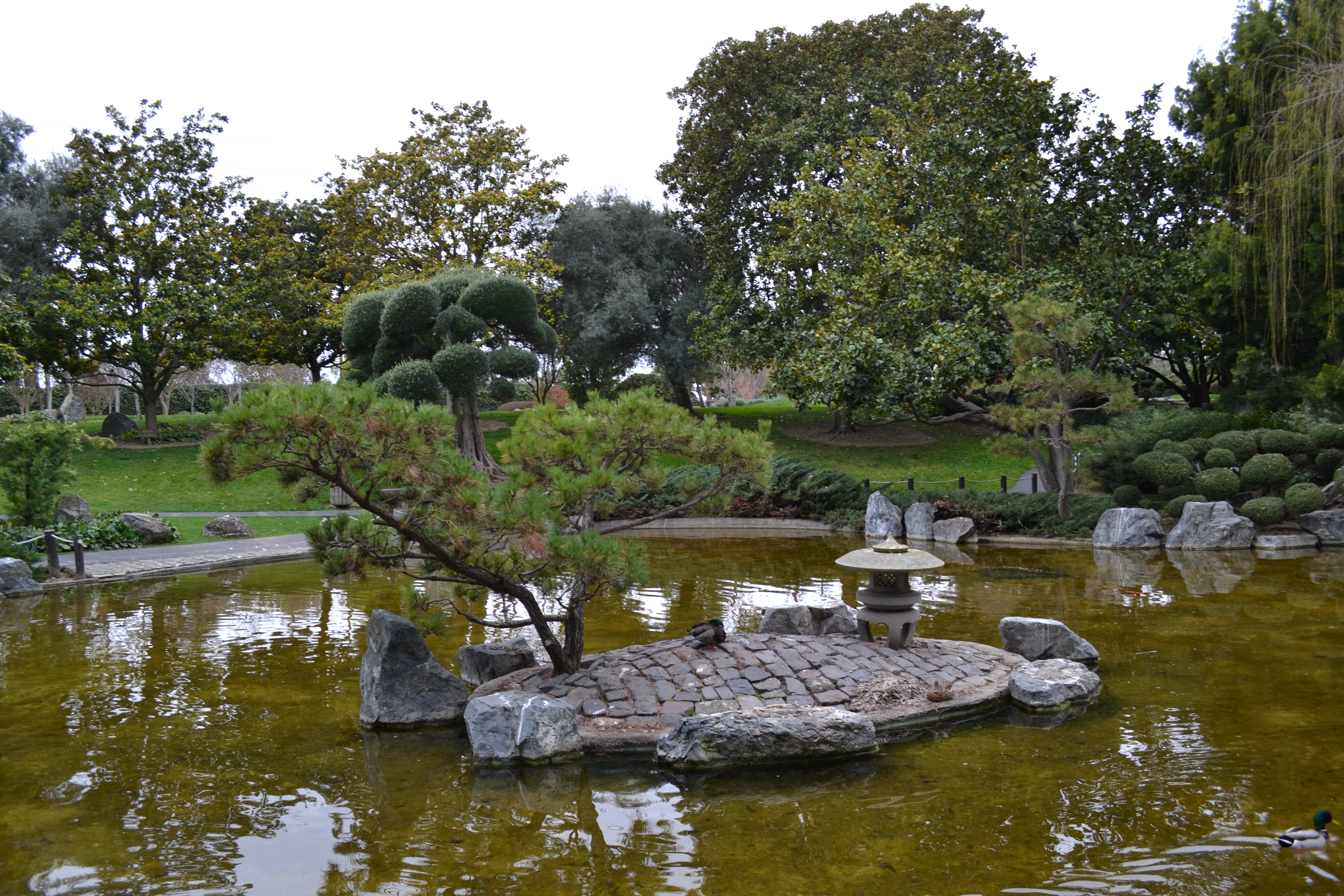
Lower pond

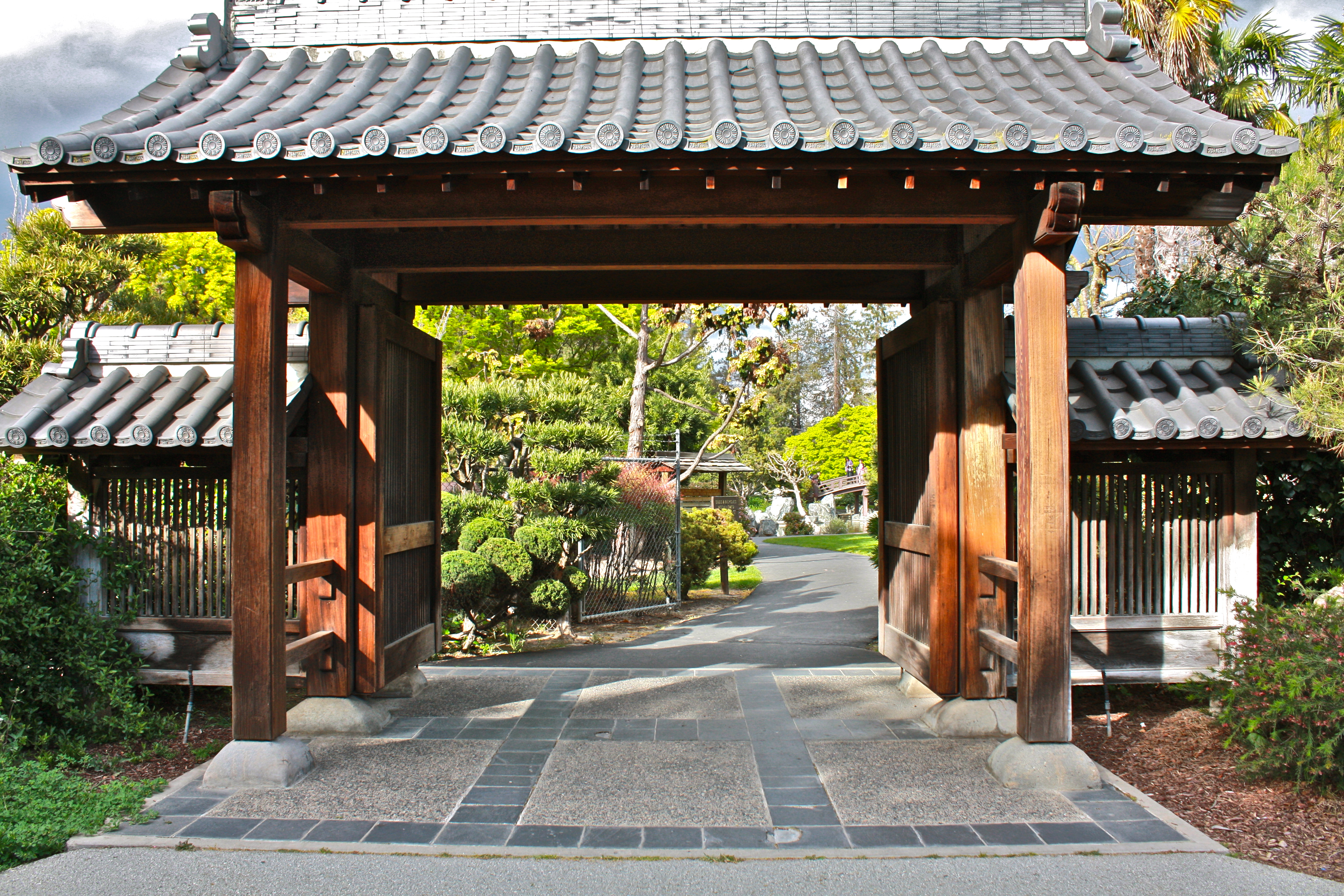
Entrance to the garden

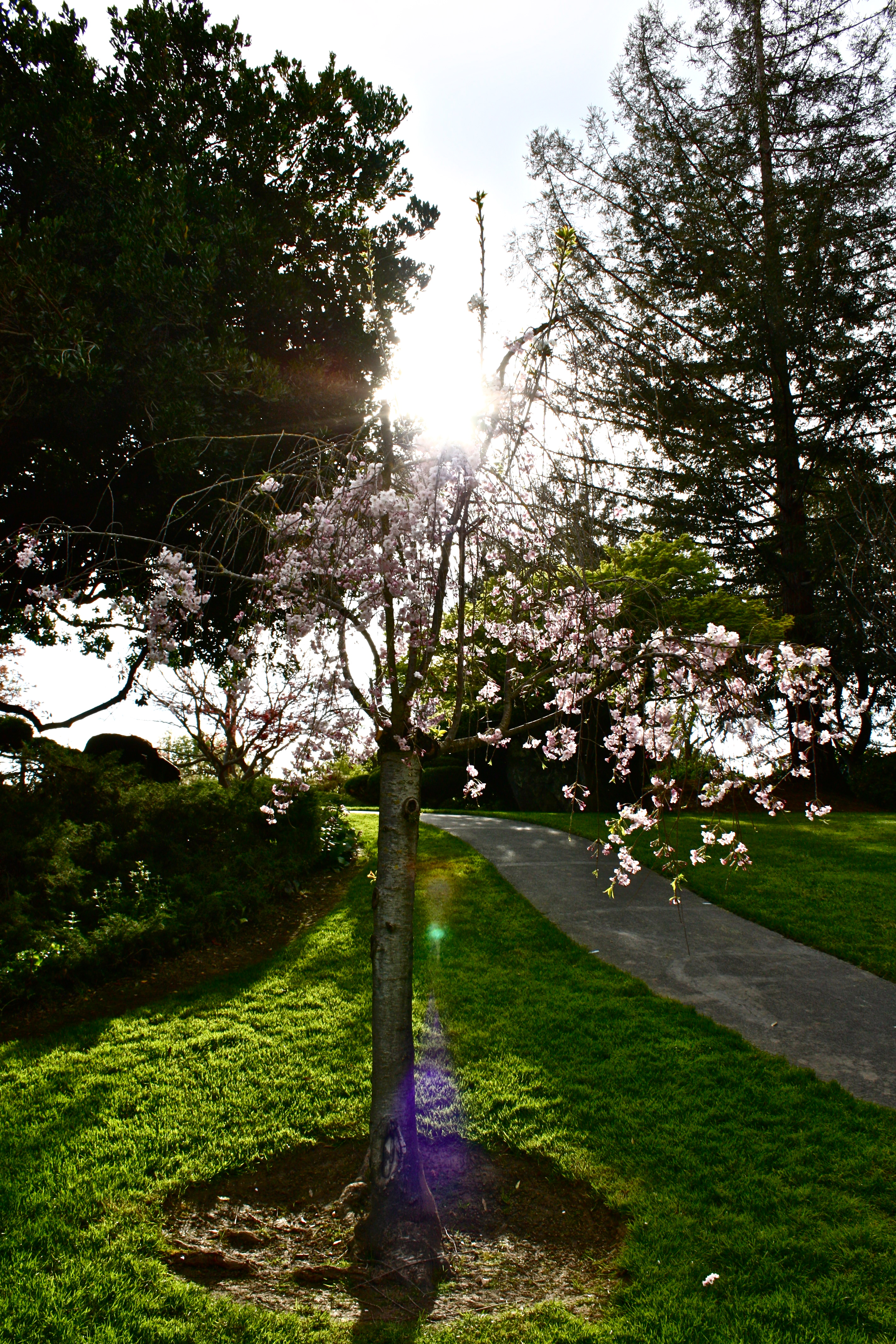
Cherry blossom near the lower pond

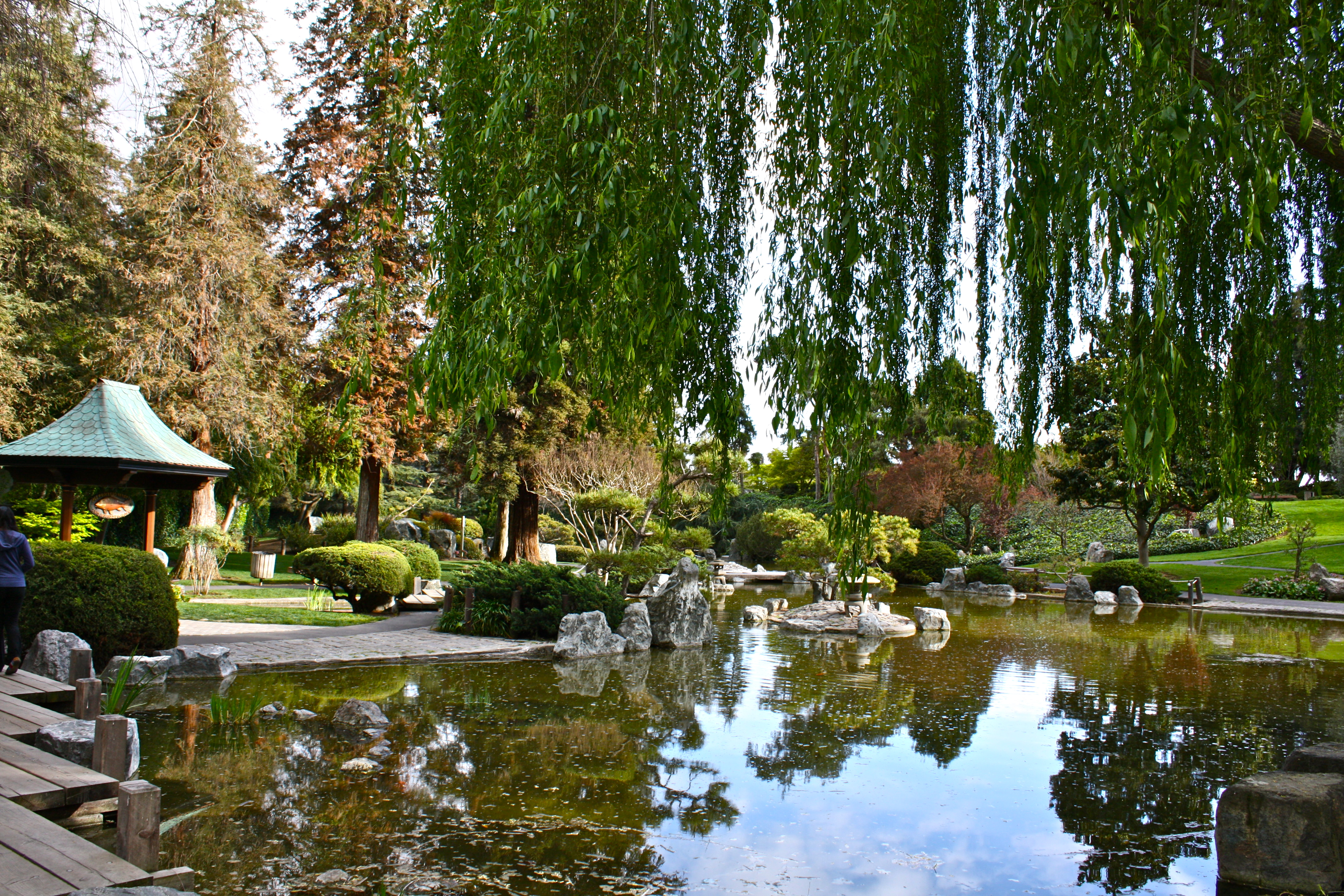
Lower pond

== See also ==
- List of botanical gardens in the United States
- Japanese garden
