= Vivace Youth Chorus of San Jose =

American youth choral program

The Vivace Youth Chorus of San Jose is a choral program for children from ages four to eighteen. Youth from throughout the Silicon Valley participate in six program levels. The chorus offers a well-rounded program that balances vocal training, music theory, and performances. Upper choir levels take part in choral festivals and tours. Choristers gain exposure to various musical genres, from traditional folk to classical, jazz, and contemporary. The chorus collaborates with area composers and musicians, as well as with other ensembles, including Opera San Jose and San Jose Symphonic Choir.

Music education at Vivace Youth Chorus is guided by the principles of the Kodály Method, which was developed in Hungary during the mid-twentieth century and named after Hungarian composer and educator Zoltán Kodály (1882–1967).

Vivace Youth Chorus was founded in 2003 by Artistic Director Peggy Spool.
