= Mazer Cup =

Mead competition

Mazer Cup or The Mazer Cup International Mead Competition is composed of two events - one for commercial companies and one for amateur brewers. It has been described as "the largest commercial and amateur mead competition in the world".

It is the largest mead event in the U.S., drawing hundreds of entries which are judged by certified mead judges, mead authors and mead celebrities, meadery owners, and meadmakers. As of 2021 it is considered to be the most prestigious mead award because the field of competition is so large. Entries come from every state and from many foreign countries. The current president (2021) is Pete Bakulić.

== See also ==
- Mazer (drinking vessel)
- Mead in the United States
