= Rabbit's Foot Meadery =

American meadery and winery located in California

- Type: Private
- Industry: Alcoholic beverages
- Founded: 1995
- Founder: Michael Faul
- Headquarters: Sunnyvale, California, United States
- Key people: Michael Faul
- Products: Mead
- Production output: 60,000 gallons
- Owner: Michael Faul
- Website: www.rabbitsfootmeadery.com

Rabbit's Foot Meadery is a meadery and winery founded in Sunnyvale, California, United States, and located in Sutter Creek, California.

== History ==
Rabbit's Foot Meadery was founded in 1995 when Michael Faul of Sunnyvale, California began producing commercial versions of many historical recipes for brewing mead. Faul is credited with the expansion of the modern commercial mead making industry along with David Myers of Redstone Meadery in Boulder, Colorado.

Rabbit's Foot Meadery has won numerous awards and is known throughout the industry as a leader and innovator. Rabbit's Foot Meadery was the first company to produce commercially viable versions of cyser and braggot to create styles of mead from historical recipes.

The company is well known for producing articles on the production of mead and has been featured on national television and radio and notably on the internet radio talk show The Brewing Network, where it provides a wealth of information to home mead makers and commercial producers alike.

The Sunnyvale location of Rabbit's Foot Meadery closed in 2021 and no longer operates a public tasting room in Sunnyvale. Their new location operates near the Sierra foothills town of Sutter Creek.

== Awards ==
- 2014 California Cider Competition - Silver - Red Branch Cider Company Hard Raspberry
- 2014 California Cider Competition - Bronze - Red Branch Cider Company Hard Black Cherry
- 2015 International Mead Festival - Mazer Cup - Gold Medal Honey Stout - Stout
- 2015 International Mead Festival - Mazer Cup - Silver Medal Biere de Miel - Kolsch
- 2015 International Mead Festival - Mazer Cup - Bronze Medal Diabhal - Belgian Style Golden Ale
- 2015 International Mead Festival - Mazer Cup - Bronze Medal - Melia
- 2016 International Mead Festival - Mazer Cup - Gold Medal - Honey Stout
- 2016 International Mead Festival - Mazer Cup - Gold Medal - Naughty Ninja - Ginger Cyser - Session Mead
- 2016 International Mead Festival - Mazer Cup - Silver Medal - Johnny Jump Up - Dry Hopped
- 2016 International Mead Festival - Mazer Cup - Bronze Medal - Hard Raspberry Cyser
- 2017 International Mead Festival - Mazer Cup - Gold Medal - Hel
- 2017 International Mead Festival - Mazer Cup - Bronze - Biere de Miel

== See also ==
- California wine
- List of breweries in California
- Mead in the United States
