= List of museums in the San Francisco Bay Area =

This list of museums in the San Francisco Bay Area is a list of museums, defined for this context as institutions (including nonprofit organizations, government entities, and private businesses) that collect and care for objects of cultural, artistic, scientific, or historical interest and make their collections or related exhibits available for public viewing. Also included are non-profit and university art galleries. Museums that exist only in cyberspace (i.e., virtual museums) are not included.

== Museums ==
=== San Francisco ===
Name	Image	Type	Summary
Academy of Art University Automobile Museum		Automobile	Non-profit automobile museum
African American Art & Culture Complex		Art	website, cultural arts center and gallery
Aquarium of the Bay		Aquarium	A variety of San Francisco Bay living habitats house the diverse animal collection, including walk-through tunnel exhibits, transparent touchpools, and a bubbling mountain stream exhibit
Alcatraz Island		Prison	Operated by the National Park Service, former federal prison, access by private ferry
American Bookbinders Museum		History	website, The history of bookbinding and bookbinders in the nineteenth and twentieth centuries
Asian Art Museum of San Francisco		Art	Arts of India, China, western Asia (including Persia), South-East Asia, Korea & Japan
Beat Museum		Literary	The Beats memorabilia and bookstore
Cable Car Museum		Transportation	
California Academy of Sciences		Natural history	
California Historical Society		Local history	State history and culture
Cartoon Art Museum		Art	Art of comics & cartoons, including original animation cels, comic book pages & early newspaper comic strips
Children's Creativity Museum		Children's	
Chinese Historical Society of America Museum and Learning Center		Ethnic	History of Chinese in U.S.
Chinese Culture Center		Art	Exhibitions of traditional & contemporary Chinese & Chinese-American art
Contemporary Jewish Museum		Ethnic	Contemporary perspectives on Jewish culture, history, art and ideas
de Young Museum		Art	American painting, sculpture & decorative art, African, Oceanic, Meso-American, Central & South American art, textiles, contemporary craft, graphics art
EcoCenter at Heron's Head Park		Education center	A unique education facility that combines environmental education, experience-based learning and habitat restoration
Exploratorium		Science	Hands-on science exhibits
Fort Point National Historic Site		Military	Part of The Presidio
Guardians of The City Museum		Local history	website, history of the city's First Responders: the San Francisco San Francisco, Police Department, Sheriff’s Office, and Emergency Medical Services
GLBT History Museum		History	History and culture of gay, lesbian, bisexual and transgender individuals, communities and movements
Gregangelo Museum		Art	website, immersive themed art
Haas-Lilienthal House		Historic house	1886 Victorian house with period rooms
Institute of Contemporary Art San Francisco		Art	Contemporary art museum
International Art Museum of America		Art	Eastern and Western art including works by Chinese masters, Yun sculptures, classic 18th to 20th-century European portraits and landscapes
The LAB		Art	Interdisciplinary arts organization with public gallery
Legion of Honor		Art	Mostly French & European art
Letterform Archive		Art	website, materials on the history of lettering, typography, printing, and graphic design
Mexican Museum		Ethnic	Historic and contemporary art and culture of the Latino, Chicano, Mexican, and Mexican-American people
Military Intelligence Service Historic Learning Center		Multiple	website, history of Military Intelligence Service in the Presidio, Japanese American history, art and culture, operated by the National Japanese American Historical Society
Mission Cultural Center for Latino Arts		Art	website, cultural arts center and gallery
Mission Dolores		Religious	Oldest original intact Mission in California and the oldest building in San Francisco
Musée Mécanique		Amusements	Penny arcade games, mechanically operated musical instruments, video arcade games
Museo ItaloAmericano		Ethnic	Italian and Italian-American art and culture
Museum of Craft and Design		Art	website, contemporary craft and design
Museum of Performance & Design		Art	Performing arts
Museum of San Francisco		History	Website, operated by the San Francisco Historical Society
Museum of Russian Culture		Ethnic	website, part of the Russian Center of San Francisco
Museum of the African Diaspora		Cultural	Diasporan histories of people of African origin & their influence & adaptation throughout the world
North Beach Museum		Local history	Located on the 2nd floor of the Eureka Bank building
Octagon House 1861		Historic house	Operated by The National Society of the Colonial Dames of America
The Presidio		Multiple	Park with several visitor centers with a fort, marine, military and historical exhibits
Randall Museum		Multiple	Art, science, natural history, live animals
Ripley's Believe It or Not!		Entertainment	Near Fisherman's Wharf
San Francisco Arts Commission Gallery		Art	Contemporary art, three locations in San Francisco
San Francisco Fire Department Museum		Firefighting	website
San Francisco Maritime National Historical Park		Maritime	Includes a fleet of historic vessels, a visitor center, a maritime museum and a library/research facility
San Francisco Museum of Modern Art		Art	website
San Francisco Music Hall of Fame Gallery		Local history	website, The gallery displays around 90 iconic San Francisco Bay Area artists and bands.
San Francisco Railway Museum		Railway	Antique streetcars, cable cars, earthquake of 1906
San Francisco War Memorial and Performing Arts Center		Performing arts	Tours of the various performance spaces
Sea Lion Center		Education center	A colony of wild California sea lions now permanently established in this unusual urban location. The center provides free educational programming on the natural history of California sea lions
SFO Museum		Multiple	website, Aviation Museum and a selection of temporary exhibitions in the terminals at San Francisco International Airport
Society of California Pioneers		Local history	California art, history, and culture
SS Jeremiah O'Brien		Museum ship	World War II Liberty ship located at Fisherman's Wharf
Tenderloin Museum		Local history	website, History of the tenderloin neighborhood
Walt Disney Family Museum		Biographical	Walt Disney's life, awards & memorabilia
USS Pampanito		Museum ship	Submarine located at Fisherman's Wharf
Wattis Institute for Contemporary Arts		Art	Part of California College of the Arts
Wells Fargo History Museum		History	First location of the Wells Fargo company, history of the company and the California gold rush
Yerba Buena Center for the Arts		Art	Contemporary arts center with several galleries

=== East Bay Area ===
Name	Image	Town/City	County	Region	Type	Summary
Aftel Archive of Curious Scents		Berkeley	Alameda	East Bay	Perfume	The first museum in the U.S. dedicated to perfume and the experience of fragrance. website
Aggregate Space Gallery		Oakland	Alameda	East Bay	Art	A non-profit, artist-run exhibition and performance space in West Oakland. website
Alameda Museum		Alameda	Alameda	East Bay	Local history	Operated by the Alameda Historical Society
Alameda Naval Air Museum		Alameda	Alameda	East Bay	Military	website, history of the Alameda Naval Air Station, ship and airplane models
Alvarado Adobe		San Pablo	Contra Costa	East Bay	Historic house	website, operated by the San Pablo Historical Society, former home of Juan Alvarado, the governor of Mexican Alta California
African American Museum and Library at Oakland		Oakland	Alameda	East Bay	African American	
Ardenwood Historic Farm		Fremont	Alameda	East Bay	Historic house	park includes a farm, a large forest and the 19th century Patterson House
Badè Museum of Biblical Archaeology		Berkeley	Alameda	East Bay	Archaeology	Part of Pacific School of Religion, artifacts from ancient Israel and Palestine, Greek and Cypriot ceramics, Egyptian scarabs, cuneiform tablets from ancient Mesopotamia, and over 300 historic Bibles from around the world
Bancroft Gallery		Berkeley	Alameda	East Bay	Multiple	Exhibitions from the collections of the Bancroft Library
Berkeley Art Museum and Pacific Film Archive		Berkeley	Alameda	East Bay	Art	Part of University of California, Berkeley, strengths in historical and contemporary Asian art, early American painting, mid-20th-century, Conceptual, contemporary international art, and California and Bay Area art
Berkeley History Center		Berkeley	Alameda	East Bay	Local history	website, operated by the Berkeley Historical Society
Black Diamond Mines Regional Preserve		Antioch	Contra Costa	East Bay	Mining	Park of former coal and sand mine
Blackhawk Museum		Blackhawk	Contra Costa	East Bay	Automotive	Classic cars
Blume House		San Pablo	Contra Costa	East Bay	Historic house	website, operated by the San Pablo Historical Society
Camron-Stanford House		Oakland	Alameda	East Bay	Historic house	website, Victorian house museum
Casa Peralta		San Leandro	Alameda	East Bay	Historic house	
Chabot Space and Science Center		Oakland	Alameda	East Bay	Science	
The Cobra Experience		Martinez	Contra Costa	East Bay	Automotive history	website, Museum committed to the promotion, conservation, education and preservation of the cars produced by Shelby American
Cohen-Bray House		Oakland	Alameda	East Bay	Historic house	website, late 19th-century Victorian period house, operated by the Victorian Preservation Center of Oakland
Crockett Museum		Crockett	Contra Costa	East Bay	Local history	website
Diablo Valley College Art Gallery		Pleasant Hill	Contra Costa	East Bay	Art	website
Duarte Garage Museum		Livermore	Alameda	East Bay	Automotive	website, operated by the Livermore Heritage Guild, classic cars and auto memorabilia, also called Lincoln Highway Museum
Dublin Heritage Park and Museums		Dublin	Alameda	East Bay	Open air	website, includes 1856 Murray Schoolhouse, 1859 St. Raymond's Church, Kolb House and outbuildings and Dublin Pioneer Cemetery
Dunsmuir House		Oakland	Alameda	East Bay	Historic house	37-room Victorian mansion and estate grounds
Essig Museum of Entomology		Berkeley	Alameda	East Bay	Natural history	Insect research museum of the University of California, Berkeley, collections are only open to the public during the annual open house
Galindo House and Gardens		Concord	Contra Costa	East Bay	Historic house	19th century period historic house
Eugene O'Neill National Historic Site		Danville	Contra Costa	East Bay	Historic house	website Tao House, home of Nobel Prize winning playwright Eugene O'Neill
Forest Home Farms		San Ramon	Contra Costa	East Bay	Open air	16 acre park with 2 houses, fourteen outbuildings, and the Victorian period Glass House Museum
Golden State Model Railroad Museum		Richmond	Contra Costa	East Bay	Railroad	Features dozens of realistic city and country scenes, with model trains from different eras running on several layouts in different scales
Golden Gate Railroad Museum		Sunol	Alameda	East Bay	Railroad	Houses 12 locomotives and over 25 pieces of rolling stock, which are shown for special events
Habitot Children's Museum		Berkeley	Alameda	East Bay	Children's	website
Hayward Area Historical Society		Hayward	Alameda	East Bay	Local history	Operates the HAHS Center for History and Culture
Joel Clayton Historic House Museum		Clayton	Contra Costa	East Bay	History	website, operated by the Clayton Historical Society
John Muir National Historic Site		Martinez	Contra Costa	East Bay	Biographical	website Home of John Muir, "father of the national park service" and founder of the Sierra Club
Lacis Museum of Lace and Textiles		Berkeley	Alameda	East Bay	Textile	website
Lawrence Hall of Science		Berkeley	Alameda	East Bay	Science	
Lightship RELIEF – WLV 605		Oakland	Alameda	East Bay	Museum ship	U.S. Coast Guard lightship
Lindsay Wildlife Museum		Walnut Creek	Contra Costa	East Bay	Nature center	Natural history exhibits, animals, wildlife rehabilitation center
Livermore Carnegie Museum		Livermore	Alameda	East Bay	Local history	website, operated by the Livermore Heritage Guild
Magnes Collection of Jewish Art and Life		Berkeley	Alameda	East Bay	Ethnic	Art & history of the Jewish community in the thirteen western United States, now part of the University of California, Berkeley
Martinez Museum		Martinez	Contra Costa	East Bay	Local history	website, operated by the Martinez Historical Society
Meek Mansion		Cherryland	Alameda	East Bay	Historic house	Operated by the Hayward Area Historical Society, open for special events
McConaghy House		Hayward	Alameda	East Bay	Historic house	Operated by the Hayward Area Historical Society in Kennedy Park, Victorian estate
Mills College Art Museum		Oakland	Alameda	East Bay	Art	Part of Mills College, creative work of women as artists and curators
Mission San José		Fremont	Alameda	East Bay	Historic church	
Museum of Art and Digital Entertainment		Oakland	Alameda	East Bay	Computer Games	Play vintage video games.
MOCHA: Museum of Children's Art		Oakland	Alameda	East Bay	Children's	website, hands-on children's art programs
Museum of the San Ramon Valley		Danville	Contra Costa	East Bay	Local history	website, housed in the Danville Southern Pacific Railroad Depot
Museum of Vertebrate Zoology		Berkeley	Alameda	East Bay	Natural history	Research museum of the University of California, Berkeley, collections are only open to the public during the annual open house, but a limited number exhibits are on display outside of the collection
Museum on Main		Pleasanton	Alameda	East Bay	Local history	website, operated by the Amador-Livermore Valley Historical Society
Niles Canyon Railway		Fremont	Alameda	East Bay	Railway	Heritage train and bus rides
Niles Depot Museum		Fremont	Alameda	East Bay	Railway	Model railroads
Niles Essanay Silent Film Museum		Fremont	Alameda	East Bay	Media	Silent films and their history
Oakland Asian Cultural Center		Oakland	Alameda	East Bay	Culture	Asian Pacific arts, culture and history
Oakland Aviation Museum		Oakland	Alameda	East Bay	Aviation	Formerly the Western Aerospace Museum, over 30 vintage and modern airplanes, both civilian and military, and other displays that highlight noted aviators and innovators
Oakland Museum of California		Oakland	Alameda	East Bay	Multiple	Art, history, culture and natural environment of California
Orly Museum of Hungarian Culture		Berkeley	Alameda	East Bay	Ethnic	website
Pacific Pinball Museum		Alameda	Alameda	East Bay	Amusement	Formerly the Lucky JuJu Pinball Museum, history, science and art of pinball machines
Pardee Home		Oakland	Alameda	East Bay	Historic house	1969 Victorian mansion with decorative artifacts
Phoebe A. Hearst Museum of Anthropology		Berkeley	Alameda	East Bay	Anthropology	Formerly the Lowie Museum of Anthropology, part of the University of California at Berkeley, collections include Native California, China, Africa ancient civilizations of Egypt, Peru, North America and the Mediterranean
Richmond Museum of History		Richmond	Contra Costa	East Bay	Local history	website
Saint Mary's College Museum of Art		Moraga	Contra Costa	East Bay	Art	website, part of Saint Mary's College of California, collection includes works by Andy Warhol, William Keith and over 4000 art objects
San Leandro History Museum & Art Gallery		San Leandro	Alameda	East Bay	Local history	website
Shadelands Ranch Museum		Walnut Creek	Contra Costa	East Bay	Local history	Operated by the Walnut Creek Historical Society
SS Red Oak Victory		Richmond	Contra Costa	East Bay	Maritime	Part of Rosie the Riveter/World War II Home Front National Historical Park, World War II Victory ship
Takara Sake Museum		Berkeley	Alameda	East Bay	Food	website, historical sake-making process, sake artifacts and implements, history of sake-making in the United States
Thorsen House		Berkeley	Alameda	East Bay	Historic house	American Craftsman style house
Union City Historical Museum		Union City	Alameda	East Bay	Local history	
University of California Museum of Paleontology		Berkeley	Alameda	East Bay	Paleontology	Collections are only open to the public during the annual open house, but a limited number of fossil exhibits are on display outside of the collection
USS Hornet Museum		Alameda	Alameda	East Bay	Museum ship	United States Navy aircraft carrier that served in World War II, the Vietnam War, and also played a part in the Apollo program
USS Potomac (AG-25)		Oakland	Alameda	East Bay	Museum ship	President Franklin Roosevelt's presidential yacht
Washington Township Museum of Local History		Fremont	Alameda	East Bay	Local history	Focused on southwestern part of Alameda County, the museum has exhibits, walking tours, and classes.

=== San Francisco Peninsula ===
Name	Image	Town/City	County	Region	Type	Summary
Anderson Collection		Stanford	Santa Clara	San Francisco Peninsula	Art	One of the world's most outstanding private assemblies of modern and contemporary American art.
Burlingame Museum of Pez Memorabilia	(closed in 2019)	Burlingame	San Mateo	San Francisco Peninsula	Toy	Pez dispensers, includes the Classic Toy Museum with toys of the past
Colma Historical Museum		Colma	San Mateo	San Francisco Peninsula	Local history	website, operated by the Colma Historical Association
CuriOdyssey		San Mateo	San Mateo	San Francisco Peninsula	Natural history	Natural history and environmental education center with an aviary and over 50 non-releasable native animals, formerly the Coyote Point Museum
Filoli		Woodside	San Mateo	San Francisco Peninsula	Historic house	43-room country estate with 16-acre (6.5 ha) formal garden
Hiller Aviation Museum		San Carlos	San Mateo	San Francisco Peninsula	Aviation	Vintage and futuristic aircraft, prototypes, photographic displays and models
Iris & B. Gerald Cantor Center for Visual Arts		Stanford University	Santa Clara	San Francisco Peninsula	Art	website Art including the largest collection of works by Auguste Rodin in the USA
Millbrae Museum		Millbrae	San Mateo	San Francisco Peninsula	Local history	website, operated by the Millbrae Historical Society, antique furnishings, clothing, household items, transportation
Millbrae Train Museum		Millbrae	San Mateo	San Francisco Peninsula	Railroad	website, operated by the Millbrae Historical Society
Peninsula Museum of Art		San Bruno	San Mateo	San Francisco Peninsula	Art	Changing exhibitions of work by outstanding artists of the Greater Bay Area
Sanchez Adobe		Pacifica	San Mateo	San Francisco Peninsula	Historic house	Operated by the San Mateo County History Museum
San Mateo County History Museum		Redwood City	San Mateo	San Francisco Peninsula	Local history	History of San Mateo County including natural resources, immigration, important figures, industries, maritime history
South San Francisco Historical Society Museum		South San Francisco	San Mateo	San Francisco Peninsula	Local History	website, artifacts, memorabilia, oral histories, photograph collection
The Foster Museum		Palo Alto	Santa Clara	San Francisco Peninsula	Art	website Single-artist museum exhibiting the artwork Journeys of artist-explorer Tony Foster
Woodside Store		Woodside	San Mateo	San Francisco Peninsula	Historic site	Operated by the San Mateo County History Museum, general store restored to 1880s appearance

=== Santa Clara Valley ===
Entries in this list are generally according to Santa Clara Valley.

Name	Image	Town/City	County	Region	Type	Summary
Agnews Historic Cemetery & Museum		Santa Clara	Santa Clara	Santa Clara Valley	Medical	website, historic cemetery and museum about the Agnews State Hospital and later Agnews Developmental Center from 1888 to 2009, museum open by appointment
Ainsley House		Campbell	Santa Clara	Santa Clara Valley	Historic house	1925 Craftsman-style house, Morgan Gallery in the carriage house features exhibits of local history
Berryessa Adobe		Santa Clara	Santa Clara	Santa Clara Valley	Historic house	website, 1840s adobe house
California History Center		Cupertino	Santa Clara	Santa Clara Valley	History	Education center and exhibit hall on regional and California history, part of De Anza College
Campbell Historical Museum		Campbell	Santa Clara	Santa Clara Valley	Local history	Small history museum located in the city of Campbell's first public building, Firehouse No. 1. Features interactive exhibits that rotate once a year.
Children's Discovery Museum of San Jose		San Jose	Santa Clara	Santa Clara Valley	Children's	
Computer History Museum		Mountain View	Santa Clara	Santa Clara Valley	Computer	Museum about the history of computing and information technology
Cupertino Historical Society and Museum		Cupertino	Santa Clara	Santa Clara Valley	Local history	website
De Saisset Museum		Santa Clara	Santa Clara	Santa Clara Valley	Multiple	Part of the Santa Clara University, art & history, includes paintings, jewels, silver, tapestries, California & Native American historical artifacts
Euphrat Museum of Art		Cupertino	Santa Clara	Santa Clara Valley	Art	Part of De Anza College
Gilroy Museum		Gilroy	Santa Clara	Santa Clara Valley	Local history	website, Gilroy Historical Society, history of Gilroy and the South Santa Clara County area, housed in the historic 1910 Carnegie Library Building
Harris-Lass Museum		Santa Clara	Santa Clara	Santa Clara Valley	Historic house	website, operated by the Historic Preservation Society of Santa Clara, 19th-century Italianate farmhouse
Headen-Inman House		Santa Clara	Santa Clara	Santa Clara Valley	Local history	Exhibits on local history, located on the grounds of the Triton Museum of Art
History Park at Kelley Park		San Jose	Santa Clara	Santa Clara Valley	Open air	Includes 27 original and reproduction homes, business and landmarks, Portuguese Historical Museum, Viet Museum, trolley barn with vehicles, art gallery
Hoover Institution Library and Archives		Stanford	Santa Clara	Santa Clara Valley	History	Part of the Hoover Institution at Stanford University, changing exhibits from the collections in the Herbert Hoover Memorial Exhibit Pavilion
Intel Museum		Santa Clara	Santa Clara	Santa Clara Valley	Science	Transistors, computer memory, microprocessors, how computer chips are made, history of Intel
Ira F. Brilliant Center for Beethoven Studies		San Jose	Santa Clara	Santa Clara Valley	Music	Life and works of composer Ludwig van Beethoven, operated by San Jose State University and the American Beethoven Society
Iris & B. Gerald Cantor Center for Visual Arts		Stanford	Santa Clara	Santa Clara Valley	Art	Formerly the Stanford University Museum of Art, part of Stanford University, includes Auguste Rodin sculpture garden
Japanese American Museum of San Jose		San Jose	Santa Clara	Santa Clara Valley	Ethnic	Located in Japantown, Japanese American art, history and culture
Junior Museum & Zoo		Palo Alto	Santa Clara	Santa Clara Valley	Multiple	website, owned and operated by the City of Palo Alto, hands-on science and natural history exhibits, live animals
Los Altos History Museum		Los Altos	Santa Clara	Santa Clara Valley	Local history	Includes the early 20th century J. Gilbert Smith House, area agriculture, cultural history
Movimiento de Arte y Cultura Latino Americana (MACLA)		San Jose	Santa Clara	Santa Clara Valley	Art	A contemporary Latino visual arts and performing arts space, as well as a community arts education program.
Moffett Field Historical Society Museum		Moffett Field	Santa Clara	Santa Clara Valley	Aviation	website, history of Moffett Federal Airfield, Navy airship USS Macon
Museum of American Heritage		Palo Alto	Santa Clara	Santa Clara Valley	History	Also known as MOAH, inventions and technology of the 19th and 20th century in a series of settings typical of the era
NASA Ames Exploration Center		Moffett Federal Airfield	Santa Clara	Santa Clara Valley	Science	NASA technology, missions and space exploration
New Almaden Quicksilver Mining Museum		New Almaden	Santa Clara	Santa Clara Valley	Mining	Exhibits about the history of mercury mining and the lifestyles of mining communities at New Almaden
New Museum Los Gatos		Los Gatos	Santa Clara	Santa Clara Valley	Multiple	Local history and art
Palo Alto Art Center		Palo Alto	Santa Clara	Santa Clara Valley	Art	Art and artists of the San Francisco Bay Area
Peralta Adobe		San Jose	Santa Clara	Santa Clara Valley	Historic house	Open by appointment
Portuguese Historical Museum		San Jose	Santa Clara	Santa Clara Valley	Ethnic	Part of History Park at Kelley Park, Portuguese history and culture, immigration into the Santa Clara Valley
Rengstorff House		Mountain View	Santa Clara	Santa Clara Valley	Historic house	Victorian Italianate mansion with period rooms
Rosicrucian Egyptian Museum		San Jose	Santa Clara	Santa Clara Valley	Archaeological	Ancient Egypt
San Benito County Historical & Recreational Park		Hollister	San Benito	Santa Clara Valley	Open air	website, operated by the San Benito County Historical Society, historical village includes a school, dance hall, bar, jail, several houses, print shop and antique farm vehicles
San Jose Institute of Contemporary Art		San Jose	Santa Clara	Santa Clara Valley	Art	Contemporary art by emerging and established Bay Area artists
San Jose Museum of Art		San Jose	Santa Clara	Santa Clara Valley	Art	Focuses on West Coast artists and artists of the Pacific Rim
San Jose Museum of Quilts & Textiles		San Jose	Santa Clara	Santa Clara Valley	Textile	Quilts and textiles as an art form
South Bay Historical Railroad Society Museum		Santa Clara	Santa Clara	Santa Clara Valley	Railroad	Also known as the Edward Peterman Museum of Railroad History, housed in the Santa Clara Depot
Sunnyvale Heritage Park Museum		Sunnyvale	Santa Clara	Santa Clara Valley	Local history	
The Foster Museum		Palo Alto	Santa Clara	San Francisco Peninsula	Art	website Single-artist museum exhibiting the artwork Journeys of artist-explorer Tony Foster
The Tech Museum of Innovation		San Jose	Santa Clara	Santa Clara Valley	Science	
Thompson Gallery at San José State University		San Jose	Santa Clara	Santa Clara Valley	Art	website, located in Art Building No. 127
Triton Museum of Art		Santa Clara	Santa Clara	Santa Clara Valley	Art	Contemporary and historical works of art by artists of the Greater Bay Area
Viet Museum		San Jose	Santa Clara	Santa Clara Valley	Ethnic	Part of History Park at Kelley Park, experience of Vietnamese Americans and their journey from Vietnam to the United States
Villa Mira Monte		Morgan Hill	Santa Clara	Santa Clara Valley	Multiple	website, operated by the Morgan Hill Historical Society, 1884 Hiram Morgan Hill House with Queen Anne and Stick/Eastlake design, Morgan Hill Museum with a rock and mineral collection
Villa Montalvo		Saratoga	Santa Clara	Santa Clara Valley	Art	Historic mansion, houses the Montalvo Arts Center with a gallery and performing arts
Wapple House Museum		Hollister	San Benito	Santa Clara Valley	Local history	website, operated by the San Benito County Historical Society
Winchester Mystery House		San Jose	Santa Clara	Santa Clara Valley	Historic house	160-room Victorian mansion with many unexplained oddities
Wings of History Museum		San Martin	Santa Clara	Santa Clara Valley	Aviation	Antique aircraft and aircraft engines
Works/San Jose		San Jose	Santa Clara	Santa Clara Valley	Art	website, alternative community art and performance center with exhibit gallery

=== Other San Francisco Bay Area ===
Name	Image	Town/City	County	Region	Type	Summary
Arts Benicia		Benicia	Solano	San Francisco Bay Area	Art	website, art center with exhibit gallery
Bay Area Discovery Museum		Sausalito	Marin	San Francisco Bay Area	Children's	
Bay Model Visitor Center		Sausalito	Marin	San Francisco Bay Area	Science	Three-dimensional hydraulic model of San Francisco Bay and Delta areas capable of simulating tides and currents, over 1.5 acres (0.61 ha) in size, operated by the US Army Corps of Engineers
Benicia Capitol State Historic Park		Benicia	Solano	San Francisco Bay Area	History	California's third capitol building, restored to 1850s appearance
Benicia Fire Museum		Benicia	Solano	San Francisco Bay Area	Firefighting	website, historic fire engines, trucks, equipment
Benicia Historical Museum		Benicia	Solano	San Francisco Bay Area	Local history	website
Bolinas Museum		Bolinas	Marin	San Francisco Bay Area	Art	website
California Indian Museum and Cultural Center		Santa Rosa	Sonoma	North Coast	Native American	website, California Indian history and culture from an Indian perspective
California Missions Museum		Sonoma	Sonoma	North Coast	History	Located at Cline Cellars, models of the California missions
Charles M. Schulz Museum and Research Center		Santa Rosa	Sonoma	North Coast	Biographical	Life and art of cartoonist Charles M. Schulz
Children's Museum of Sonoma County		Santa Rosa	Sonoma	North Coast	Children's	website
China Camp State Park		San Rafael	Marin	San Francisco Bay Area	Open air	Exhibits about former Chinese shrimp-fishing village including a house museum
Cloverdale History Center and Museum		Cloverdale	Sonoma	North Coast	Historic house	website, operated by the Cloverdale Historical Society, includes the late 19th-century Gould-Shaw House
Depot Park Museum		Petaluma	Sonoma	North Coast	Local history	website, operated by the Sonoma Valley Historical Society, includes railroad artifacts and displays, a Victorian kitchen and historic schoolroom
Dixie Schoolhouse		San Rafael	Marin	San Francisco Bay Area	Education	One room schoolhouse
Dutra Museum of Dredging		Rio Vista	Solano	San Francisco Bay Area	Industry	website, private collection of dredging equipment and fossils, open by appointment
Falkirk Cultural Center		San Rafael	Marin	San Francisco Bay Area	Art	website, owned and operated by the City of San Rafael
Fort Ross State Historic Park		Fort Ross	Sonoma	North Coast	Open air	early 19th-century Russian-American Company settlement
Hamilton Field History Museum		Novato	Marin	San Francisco Bay Area	Military	website, history of Hamilton Army Airfield
Hand Fan Museum		Healdsburg	Sonoma	North Coast	Decorative arts	Museum about fans and the cultures and people who use them
Healdsburg Center for the Arts		Healdsburg	Sonoma	North Coast	Art	website, community arts center
Healdsburg Museum and Historical Society		Healdsburg	Sonoma	North Coast	Local history	website
Jack London State Historic Park		Glen Ellen	Sonoma	North Coast	Biographical	Also known as Jack London Home and Ranch
Jack Mason Museum of West Marin History		Inverness	Marin	San Francisco Bay Area	Local history	website
Jesse Peter Museum		Santa Rosa	Sonoma	North Coast	Native American	Native American art of North America and ethnographic art of parts of Mesoamerica, Central America, South America, Africa, and Asia
Luther Burbank Home and Gardens		Santa Rosa	Sonoma	North Coast	Historic house	
Luther Burbank's Gold Ridge Experiment Farm		Sebastopol	Sonoma	North Coast	Historic house	
Marin History Museum		San Rafael	Marin	San Francisco Bay Area	Local history	Marin County history and culture
Marin Museum of Bicycling		Fairfax	Marin	San Francisco Bay Area	Transportation history	Largest public collection of bicycles on the west coast, home of the Mountain Bike Hall of Fame, website
Marin Museum of Contemporary Art		Novato	Marin	San Francisco Bay Area	Contemporary Art	Presents new work by emerging and established artists
Marin Museum of the American Indian		Novato	Marin	San Francisco Bay Area	Native American	Situated on an actual site of a Miwok village
McCune Room at JFK Library		Vallejo	Solano	San Francisco Bay Area	Literary	website, collection of rare and unique books, printing equipment and binding tools
Military Antiques & Museum		Petaluma	Sonoma	North Coast	Military	website
Mission San Francisco de Solano		Sonoma	Sonoma	North Coast	Biographical	One of the sites of Sonoma State Historic Park, 19th-century Spanish mission
Mission San Rafael Arcángel		San Rafael	Marin	San Francisco Bay Area	History	Early 19th-century Spanish mission
Mount Tamalpais State Park		Mill Valley	Marin	San Francisco Bay Area	History	East Peak Visitor Center includes museum about the park's history and natural history, including the former railroad used to bring up visitors
Museum of International Propaganda		San Rafael	Marin	San Francisco Bay Area	Propaganda	The Museum of International Propaganda features a permanent collection of propaganda posters, paintings, sculptures, and artifacts from more than 25 countries
Napa Valley Museum		Yountville	Napa	Napa Valley	Multiple	Art and natural history of Napa Valley, including local Native American and wine-making history
Nike Missile Site SF-88		Golden Gate National Recreation Area	Marin	San Francisco Bay Area	Military	History of defensive missiles that protected San Francisco and other major cities in the United States. Only site that can lift a missile into launch position.
Novato History Museum		Novato	Marin	San Francisco Bay Area	Local history	website
Pacific Coast Air Museum		Santa Rosa	Sonoma	North Coast	Aviation	Restored American military, propeller and jet aircraft
Pena Adobe		Vacaville	Solano	San Francisco Bay Area	Historic house	Operated by the Peña Adobe Historical Society, also adjacent Mowers-Goheen Museum
Petaluma Adobe State Historic Park		Petaluma	Sonoma	North Coast	Historic house	Historic ranch and adobe house
Petaluma Historical Library and Museum		Petaluma	Sonoma	North Coast	Local history	Housed in a Carnegie library, exhibits include Petaluma poultry, dairy, and Miwok Indian history
Petaluma Wildlife & Natural Science Museum		Petaluma	Sonoma	North Coast	Natural history	Live and taxidermied animals, housed on the Petaluma High School campus
Point Reyes National Seashore			Marin	San Francisco Bay Area	Multiple	Includes Kule Loklo (a recreated Coast Miwok village), Lighthouse Visitor Center and Point Reyes Lighthouse, the Bear Valley Visitor Center with exhibits about the park's ecosystems and cultural heritage, and the Kenneth C. Patrick Visitor Center with exhibits about 16th century maritime exploration, marine fossils and marine environments
Rancho Obi-Wan		Petaluma	Sonoma	North Coast	Media	website, private tours of a collection of Star Wars props, movie items, toys, art and memorabilia
Rio Vista Museum		Rio Vista	Solano	San Francisco Bay Area	Local history	website
San Anselmo Historical Museum		San Anselmo	Marin	San Francisco Bay Area	Local history	website
Robert F. Agrella Art Gallery		Santa Rosa	Sonoma	North Coast	Art	Part of Santa Rosa Junior College, exhibits include art history, ceramics, computer graphics, drawing, graphic design, jewelry, painting, photography, printmaking and sculpture
Sebastopol Center for the Arts		Sebastopol	Sonoma	North Coast	Art	website
Sonoma County Museum		Santa Rosa	Sonoma	North Coast	Multiple	History, art, and culture of the region
Sonoma State Historic Park		Sonoma	Sonoma	North Coast	Open air	Six historic sites including Mission San Francisco de Solano, the Presidio of Sonoma, the Vallejo Estate, a historic houses, a hotel and inn
Sonoma State University Art Gallery		Rohnert Park	Sonoma	North Coast	Art	Exhibits of modern and contemporary art
Sonoma Valley Museum of Art		Sonoma	Sonoma	North Coast	Art	Works by regional, national and international modern and contemporary artists
The Space Station Museum		Novato	Marin	San Francisco Bay Area	Aerospace	website, history of space exploration, collections of U.S., Russian and Soviet space exploration artifacts
Spaulding Wooden Boat Center		Sausalito	Marin	San Francisco Bay Area	Maritime	Restores and preserves significant, historic wooden sailing vessels
Tiburon Railroad & Ferry Depot Museum		Tiburon	Marin	San Francisco Bay Area	Transportation	Railroad and ferry history and artifacts, operated by the Belvedere-Tiburon Landmarks Society
Travis Air Force Base Heritage Center		Fairfield	Solano	San Francisco Bay Area	Aviation	Features over 35 outdoor aircraft
United States Immigration Station		Angel Island	Marin	San Francisco Bay Area	History	Located in Angel Island State Park
Vacaville Museum		Vacaville	Solano	San Francisco Bay Area	Local history	website
Vallejo Naval & Historical Museum		Vallejo	Solano	San Francisco Bay Area	Local history	website, local history, Mare Island Naval Shipyard and U.S. Navy history
West County Museum		Sebastopol	Sonoma	North Coast	Local history	website, operated by the Western Sonoma County Historical Society
Western Railway Museum		Suisun	Solano	San Francisco Bay Area	Railroad	Historic streetcars and interurban electric trains from all over California and other western states
Windsor Museum		Windsor	Sonoma	North Coast	Local history	website, operated by the Windsor Historical Society in the Hembree House

== Defunct museums ==
Name	Image	Town/City	County	Region	Type	Summary	Year of closing
Bailey Art Museum (now permanently closed)		Crockett	Contra Costa	East Bay	Art	website, ceramic and metal sculptures by Clayton Bailey, watercolor drawings by Betty Bailey, and pseudo-scientific curiosities by his alter-ego Dr. Gladstone	
Diablo Valley College Museum		Pleasant Hill	Contra Costa County	San Francisco Bay Area			
Hall of Health		Berkeley	Alameda County	San Francisco Bay Area		Sponsored by Children's Hospital & Research Center at Oakland.	2009
Madame Tussauds San Francisco		San Francisco	San Francisco	San Francisco Bay Area	Wax	Located in Fisherman's Wharf, included wax models of San Francisco celebrities, movie stars, music performers, sports stars, politicians and world leaders.	2024
Museum of Conceptual Art		San Francisco	San Francisco	San Francisco Bay Area	Arts		1984
Museum of Modern Mythology		San Francisco	San Francisco	San Francisco Bay Area		Closed following the Loma Prieta earthquake.	1989
Natural World Museum		San Francisco	San Francisco	San Francisco Bay Area	Education	A mobile museum focused on environment concerns.	2009
New Langton Arts		San Francisco	San Francisco	San Francisco Bay Area	Arts		2009
Playland-Not-At-The-Beach		El Cerrito	Contra Costa	East Bay	Amusement	Amusement park games, memorabilia, pinball machines, antique amusement devices, live magic shows, a hand-carved miniature circus, side show acts, miniature dioramas, Fascination games, historic exhibits.	
Pacific Heritage Museum		San Francisco	San Francisco	San Francisco Bay Area	History	Artistic, cultural and economic achievements of the peoples of the Pacific Rim. No longer operating, replaced by Museum of San Francisco.	2018
SF Museum of Craft and Folk Art		San Francisco	San Francisco	San Francisco Bay Area	Crafts, Folk Arts		2012
Treasure Island Museum		San Francisco	San Francisco	San Francisco Bay Area	Local history, Arts	Building tours by appointment, group working to establish new museum	1997
Wax Museum at Fisherman's Wharf		San Francisco	San Francisco	San Francisco Bay Area	Wax		2013
World of the Unexplained museum		San Francisco	San Francisco	San Francisco Bay Area			1985

== See also ==
- List of attractions in Silicon Valley
