= Aman Heran =

Aman Heran is a basketball coach.

Heran co-founded (with Surinder Grewal) the AthElite Basketball Academy where he is a Head Coach. He played at the University of Calgary for two years (where he was co-captain and had a role in the Dinos’ 2004 Canada West Championship win); collegiate basketball in America for three years and De Anza College, San Jose, for another two years.

He runs the girls program at the Athelite Young Basketball Organization (AYBO) league for K-7 and its AAU Spring program for 13-18-year-olds.

== Recognition ==
As a freshman, Aman was named to the Second Team All Coast Conference, averaging 18.7 pts/game. In the 2003-4 Canada West Championship Squad, he was known for his clutch-shooting and tough-defending guard.
