= Heron's Head Park =

Public park in San Francisco

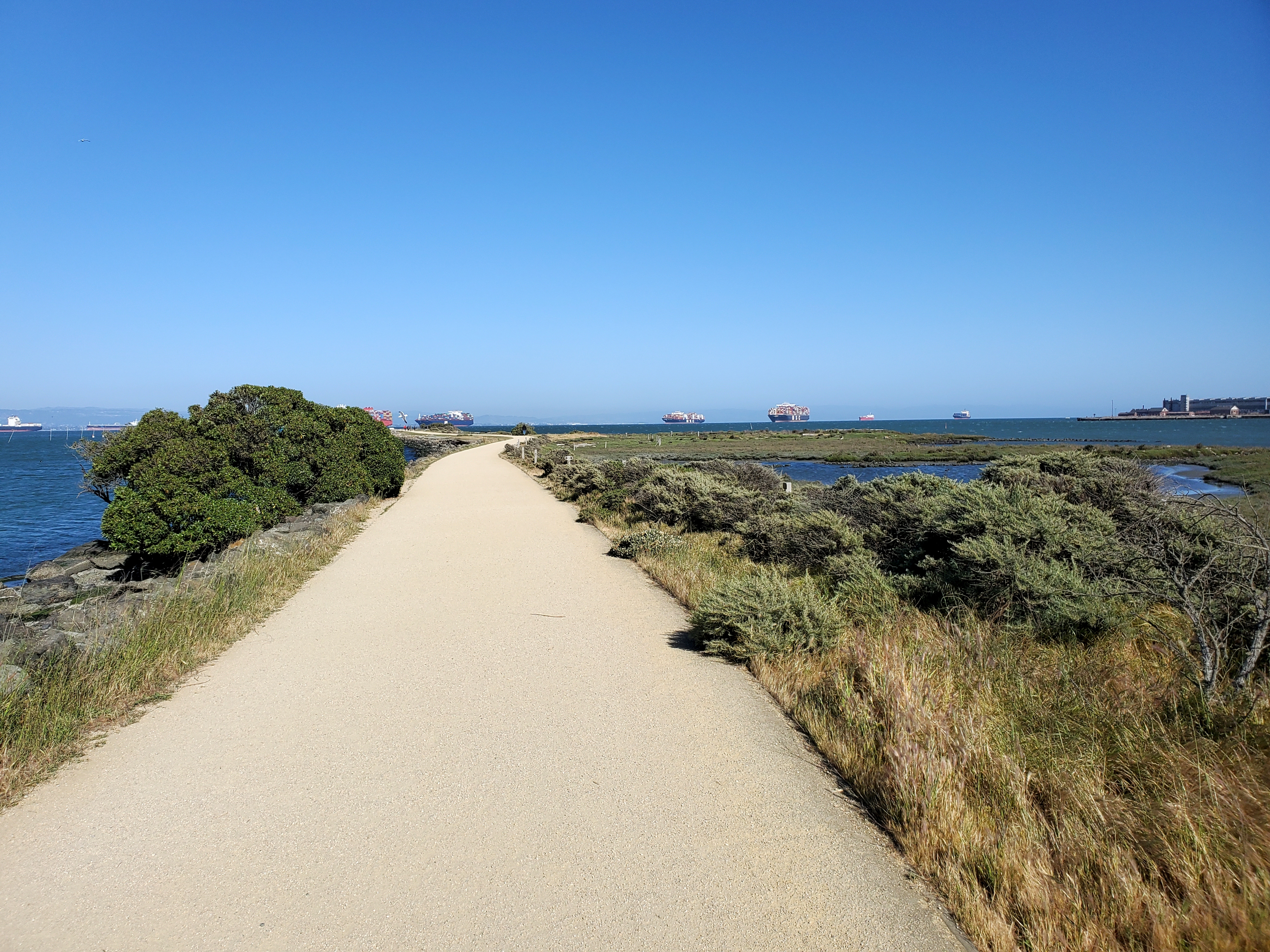
- The main path in Heron's Head Park in April 2021.
- Interactive map of Heron's Head Park
- Type: Urban park
- Location: San Francisco, California
- Coordinates: 37.738°N 122.373°W
- Established: 1998; 28 years ago
- Operator: San Francisco Port Authority

Heron's Head Park is a public park in San Francisco, California; maintained by the San Francisco Port Authority. The park is about 22 acres in size. It is based in a wetland and is known for its bird watching. The park is home to The EcoCenter, an environmental education facility. It has a UNICEF award-winning children’s playground, coined as the Nature Exploration Area (NEA) after being built by the city wide collaborative project San Francisco Children and Nature. Due to erosion on the shoreline, the park is undergoing a shoreline resilience project, where phase one of installing stabilization methods has been completed and phase two of monitoring is ongoing. The fauna of the park includes over 100 different bird species, including Great Blue Herons. The aquatic species include shore crabs, leopard sharks, and striped bass. The flora includes the California seablite, bunch grasses, ceanothus, and pickleweed.

== History ==
The area used to be called "Pier 98". In 1998, some 5,000 tons of garbage and waste was cleared to make room for picnic areas, hiking paths, and native plants. There are 8 acres of intertidal marsh in the park.

A playground area for children, the NEA, was added after the 2020 COVID pandemic. This addition was inspired by the Children & Nature Network movement, which manifested itself locally through the San Franscico Children and Nature collaborative. The playground is made in collaboration with a non-profit playground company KABOOM! and designed by Bienenstock Natural Playgrounds, with input from over 100 local children. It won the 2021 Inspire award from UNICEF as it “encourages people of all ages to engage with diverse natural elements, while promoting more equal access to outdoor play and nature.”

Improvements were completed in 2012, to add walking and bicycle facilities. From 2020 until 2022, the park underwent a project to stop the eroding shoreline by planting more native plants.

== Shoreline Resilience Project ==
Heron’s Head Park is located on the San Francisco Bay’s waterfront. The shoreline and tidal pool edges have been wearing away because waves are removing sediments faster than can be replaced. Since 1998, the shoreline has been estimated to have moved 50 feet inland because of erosion. One tidal pond is constantly flooded. In 2020, the Port of San Francisco began a restoration project to help the shoreline resist erosion and rising sea levels for the next 30 years. The project didn’t take the traditional approach of using hard structures like seawalls, which interfere with the shoreline's natural habitat. It used nature-based solutions, using natural and constructed materials built to mimic natural features to hold the shoreline in place.

Phase one of the project was completed in 2022. This phase saw two acres of dynamic coarse material beach built along the tidal marsh to reduce erosion. They created 1,600 linear feet of living shoreline within the intertidal beach to provide high tide refuge for local birds. Invasive plants were removed and 47,000 native plants, including the endangered California seablite, were added to parts of the habitat. Sixty reef balls were also planted in the subtidal area to support oyster and fish larvae settlement. Reef balls are man-made structures that reduce wave energy before it reaches the shoreline and provide a place for marine life to live. Workshops, stewardship days, and internships were set up to engage the community.

Phase two of the project is ongoing. It involves monitoring of the effects of Phase one for the following ten years and reporting on the project’s performance. The monitoring methods include qualitative and quantitative habitat assessments, photodocumentation and topographic surveys. Phase two tracked whether the coarse material beach had reduced shoreline erosion, the reef balls had recruited native oysters, and native vegetation was growing. It also evaluated the habitat created for bird nesting and feeding.

== Biology ==
=== Fauna ===
Over 100 different bird species can be spotted in the park, including Great Blue Herons, the park’s namesake. The main types of birds found here can be grouped into Waterfowl, Divers/Loons, Waders, Raptors, Shorebirds, Gulls/Terns, Non-Passerines, and Passerine birds. Most of these birds in these species can be seen year round in the park, which contains suitable examples of marsh, wetlands, and grassland habitats that attract these bird types.

The pier attached to the park is a public fishing space, which allows people to fish with a valid California Fishing License. Some aquatic species that can be found are shore crabs, leopard sharks, and striped bass.

=== Flora ===
The park serves as a refuge for native plant species including the endangered California Seablite (Suaeda californica). It has seven acres of tidal marshes and ponds, as well as nearshore oyster reefs. The park features native plants adapted for the bay’s climate like bunch grasses, ceanothus, and pickleweed.
