= Wiser ball =

Sport

Wiser ball, or known as wiser sport, is a game that originated from an ancient ball game played by royal families and high-ranking officials as a tool to practice strategic planning. The wiser sport was modified from the ancient game by the World Wiser Sport Committee which published modern rules for the game on November 30, 2013 in the Wiser Sport Handbook 1.0 and later revised the handbook on March 21, 2018, in the Wiser Sport Handbook 2.0. Version 1.0 is intended for official wiser ball competitions, while version 2.0 is intended for "general promotion and practice games."

== Field ==
The playing field for the game can be set up on any landscape (indoors or outdoors), which can even encompass obstacles. Variations in playing fields pose challenges to players. No specific boundaries are required for the game, but a measure of 12 meters by 24 meters with a "centerline" line is usually used to start the game. In official competitions, the playing field must have a length between 30 and 43 meters long, with a width not exceeding its length.

== Equipment ==
The equipment needed for the games are: one set of seven numbered white soft balls and another set of seven numbered red soft balls, ten yellow and ten red flags shaped like isosceles right triangles with poles hanging two feet above the ground, one blue flag with pole hanging 3 feet above the ground, nine to fifteen cones to mark the boundary of the game, and one twelve-metered rope used as the "centerline".

== The team players ==
In an official game, two teams play against each other, each of which has seven members. The members of each team wear uniforms numbered from one to seven. The person wearing the No. 1 uniform is the team captain.

== Claims by the WWSC ==
=== Origins and History ===
The WWSC claims that Wiser Ball has historical roots as a tool for ancient, upper-class groups to improve their mental and physical abilities. They claim that the game was lost to the passage of time and was brought back into modern era by Dorje Chang Buddha III. His name is not directly stated on their website, but is alluded to when the WWSC refers to him as "the selfless, elder virtuous one commended by the U.S. 112th Congress in Senate Resolution 614."

=== Physical and Mental Effects ===
The WWSC claims that Wiser Ball can help the elderly to:

- Avoid senile dementia
- "Enliven exhausted brain cells"
- Prevent rheumatism and chilliness
- Avoid insomnia
- Avoid numbness of the limbs

and can help all players to delay the aging process, improve their immunity and elevate their morality.
