= Gregangelo Museum =

Coordinates: 37.7327°N 122.4685°W

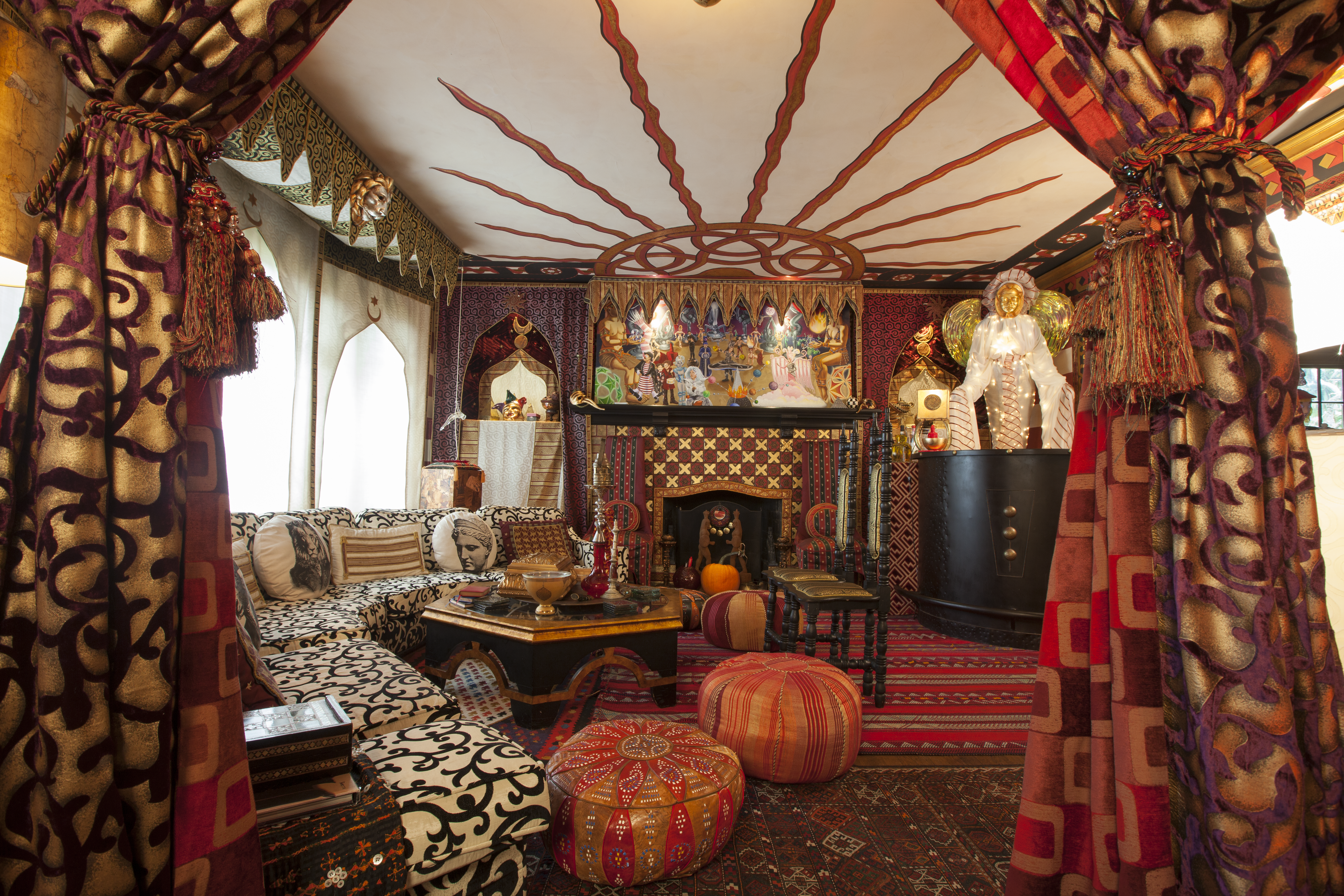
- Interactive map of Gregangelo Museum
- Location: 225 San Leandro Way, San Francisco, California, U.S.

San Francisco Designated Landmark
- Designated: June 21, 2024
- Reference no.: 318

The Gregangelo Museum is an ongoing compilation of installation art located in a Mediterranean-style house in the Balboa Terrace neighborhood of San Francisco. Originally built in the early 1920s, the house was converted into an art project during the 1980s by lifelong resident, Gregangelo Herrera. Branded as an immersive, experiential art museum, the house boasts twenty-seven thematically different rooms, all of which have been significantly remodeled, though the original 1920s architecture was intentionally salvaged.

== About ==
The museum was founded by Gregangelo Herrera, the artistic director of Velocity Circus, a circus troupe and arts and entertainment company which creates custom entertainment for public and private events. The museum doubles as headquarters for Velocity Circus.

The Gregangelo Museum has been cited in interior design books, television networks, and editorial pages such as The Bold Italic and the San Francisco Chronicle. In 2012, The Gregangelo Museum was dubbed one of a few "Home Strange Homes" by HGTV and has since been featured on Voltage TV's World's Weirdest Homes, and Netflix's Amazing Interiors. The Gregangelo Museum was also featured in The Mercury News as one of the “12 coolest bay area things you didn’t know you could do” as well as being included in Ruth Carlson’s book, Secret San Francisco: A Guide to the Weird, the Wonderful, and the Obscure.

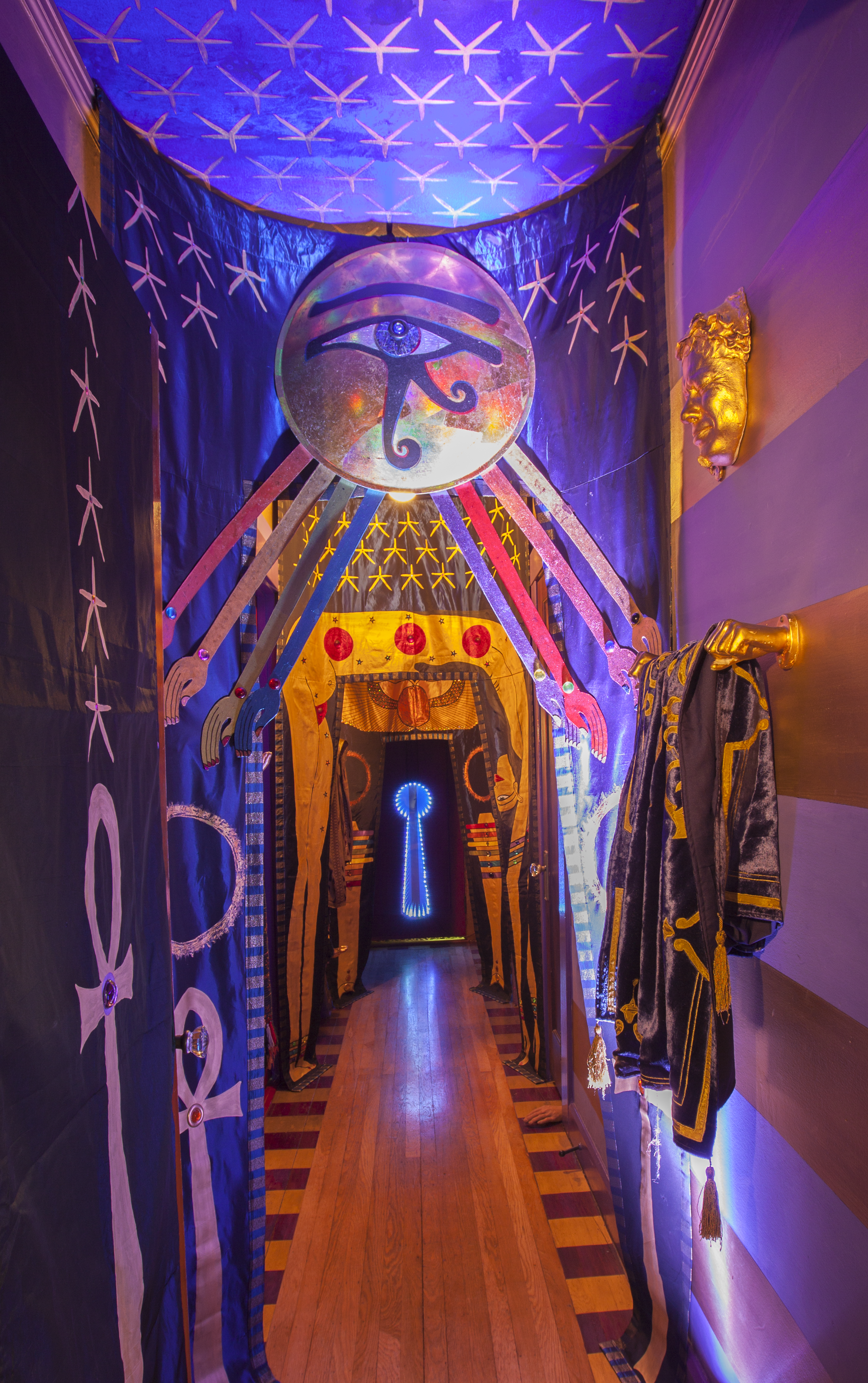

The Gregangelo Museum offers a series of guided tours, each structured around a particular theme. These tours are designed for small groups and vary in duration and focus.

Artist Laurel True made most of the mosaics in the house which have been described by author JoAnn Locktov as "unprecedented and untraditional." The house's decor mixes the humorous with the spiritual. Gregangelo uses the projects in and around the house to employ visual artists when they are not training for a show.
