= Ellen Havre Weis =

American historian and museum founder (1957–2021)

- Ellen Havre Weis in 1988
- Born: May 14, 1957; Levittown, Pennsylvania
- Died: July 27, 2021 (aged 64); Altadena, California
- Occupation(s): historian, museum co-founder
- Known for: Museum of Modern Mythology

Ellen Havre Weis (May 14, 1957 – July 27, 2021) was an American historian and a co-founder of the Museum of Modern Mythology in San Francisco.

== Early life ==
Weis was born in 1957 in Levittown, Pennsylvania. Her mother, Aimee LeVita Weis, was a college librarian, and her father Henry Kraus Weis, was a product engineer. In 1975 she enrolled in the writing program of the University of Iowa. She dropped out of school a year before graduating, and continued working in her part-time job as a typesetter at an Iowa City boutique publishing house. In 1982 she moved to San Francisco.

== Career ==
In San Francisco, Weis founded the Museum of Modern Mythology in 1982 with Matthew Cohen and Jeff Errick. The museum, was open from 1982 to 1989. It displayed 3000 pop advertising icons, including pop brand icons such as Mr. Clean, the Pillsbury Doughboy, Frito Bandito, Col. Sanders, Cap'n Crunch, Mr. Peanut and the Michelin Man. In 1987 Weis said that the museum's goal was to "take these advertising characters out of their normal context of sales and look at them as anthropology. Most of American society has been exposed to these images. Certainly the Jolly Green Giant is more recognizable than Zeus--or your state senator". The museum was damaged during the Loma Prieta earthquake and never reopened. After the museum's closure, Weis opened a public relations firm in San Francisco.

In 2004, Weis authored the book Berkeley: The Life and Spirit of a Remarkable Town.

== Death ==
Weis died at home at age 64 from brain cancer.
