= Gregangelo's Velocity Circus =

Gregangelo's Velocity Circus, also known as Velocity Arts and Entertainment, is a San Francisco-based entertainment company and circus troupe that incorporates the arts, technology, astrophysical concepts, and cultural diversity into their performance acts. The circus and entertainment company was founded in 1993 by artistic director Gregangelo Herrera, a whirling dervish, aerial arts choreographer, and drummer. The company's signature performances incorporate multiculturalism, ensemble aerial acts, optical illusions, immersive entertainment, and interactive play. Operating both one-out events and a variety of immersive shows, the troupe and entertainment company create performances and experiences with a cast of local San Francisco and Bay Area artists, including several artists they have sponsored from around the world.

For twenty-five years, Velocity Circus has remained an independent company, without federal or private grants or program funding. Though an independent, entrepreneurial set-up is unusual for most circus troupes, the troupe has experienced a range of financial and commercial success. Gregangelo's Velocity Circus/Arts and Entertainment is commissioned by non-profits, festivals, museums, corporate entities, and tech startups to create immersive experiences and fully produced shows.

Gregangelo's Velocity Arts and Entertainment Company has created performances and installations, etc., for Warner Bros., Microsoft, Lucasfilm, Lexus, Univision, Yelp, Cisco Systems, and Mercedes-Benz. For every show, performers double as crew members for Velocity Arts and Entertainment, tailor the costumes, and pitch ideas. The arts and entertainment company works in tandem with the circus, providing all of its multi-media, motion media, music, costume, makeup, hair and wigs, technology, writing, scenic, lighting, special effects, installations, infrastructure, photography, painters, sculptors, makers, and any other in-house visual and aesthetic support. The Gregangelo Museum serves as the company headquarters.

== Origins ==
Gregangelo Herrera was seventeen years old when he started his Saturday night show at the Pasha Club as a whirling dervish, drummer, and folkloric dancer. The supper club had a Moroccan fantasy aesthetic and was a metropolitan spin on Sahara City, a small Middle Eastern circus in Cairo. Gregangelo Herrera developed the act in a direction that was more futuristic and modern than the traditional Dervish act he was hired to perform and was consequently fired three times. However, they rehired him three times as well. During this period in his adolescence, he trained in dance and developed his whirling dervish act with Amina Goodyear, a cultural dance and music teacher who owned Aswan Dancers. Susu Pampanin, one of the Aswan Dance teachers in drumming, locally produced the Cairo Cat performance, where Herrera performed as an ensemble drummer. The community performances gave Herrera exposure at a young age and was formative to his philosophy about money and art.

At the age of eighteen, Herrera declared an individualized major at California College of the Arts, which incorporated multimedia, textiles, cultural studies, videography, woodworking, and drawing. The major he created allowed him to produce shows later on. Paying for school as he attended, Herrera worked at a contemporary art gallery called Japonesque. He also traveled to the remote areas in the Middle East with school grant money and earned credits for cultural studies while he continued to develop his artistic career.

Gregangelo Herrera was training at the San Francisco School of Circus Arts (Circus Center) to develop his aerial arts skills when he met Zeina Asfour, another circus performer of Lebanese descent. While training together, surrounding circus performers began to collaborate with Herrera, gaining an interest in his artist for-profit mentality. Herrera began choreographing circus acts that employed a Middle Eastern sensibility while incorporating aspects of astrophysics. In interviews and through his museum tours, Herrera points to how momentum, velocity, and the natural elements interplay in the circus field. For example, he still employs the laws of physics into the themes and titles of his choreographed performances.

Herrera became aware of the Big Bang theory in the 1990s; in 1992 scientists witnessed through a telescope what they thought was a universe coming into existence. Obsessed with the Big Bang theory, Herrera wanted a company name that described the force of everything that exists in the universe. Thus, Herrera thought the equation for velocity (velocity equals distance over time) fit the kinetic nature of circus arts, performance arts, and the arts in general. Finding that art comes into existence through movement is very characteristic of the traditional Whirling Dervish philosophy.

== Productions ==
=== Neptune Act ===
With an early start at the Circus Center, Herrera produced multiple aerial acts. During the Neptune Act, aerial artists performed in pitch black lighting, wearing UV reactive costuming. Appearing on the apparatus at abnormal times gave viewers the idea that the performers were appearing and disappearing. Herrera would continue to employ this multimedia technique throughout other shows.

=== Heliosphere and Heliosphere Jr. ===
Velocity Circus Arts and Entertainment company's global and continental exposure increased after the show Heliosphere went on tour to county festivals around the United States as a for-hire circus troupe. Paul Del Bene co-wrote the show, which attempted to look at the Solar System and beyond the Solar System, and was composed of stand alone acts based in astrophysics, such as a double contortion act called Eclipse, a fire act called Solar, and the whirling dervish act called Vortex. Encapsulating the company's Arabic and physics based aesthetic, the show attracted regional and national festivals and theaters. Though it started as a show geared towards adult viewers for its revealing costumes, mature humor and concepts, Velocity Circus was commissioned to tighten up Heliosphere for a family audience.

Heliosphere Jr. was created as an adaptation to the original Heliosphere featuring the same interactive and immersive tactics. Another purpose of the acts were to introduce world culture all over the United States, in an effort to bring San Francisco multiculturalism to small towns in middle America. The show was assembled with the goal of engaging youth while serving as an educational platform, though they have no formal educators in training, the Legion of Honor has employed the circus troupe many times to continue performances that double as educational platforms.

=== Heliopolis ===
Heliopolis was commissioned for the Tutankhamun and the Golden Age of the Pharaohs exhibition at the de Young Museum in San Francisco. The production attempted to provide a panorama of Egyptian history, mythology, folklore and fantasy. The performance featured hypnotic hand dances, hoops of fire, contortionists, aerialists, and snake charmers. The cast included 20 artists.

=== Fa Femina Miss India Pageant ===
Velocity Circus' India show at Fa Femina Miss India Pageant adopted some of the acts from Heliosphere while incorporating new acts that featured an Indian inspired dance act, a Persian fire act, and an Egyptian whirling dervish act. The performance in Hyderabad, India, attracted Velocity Circus' largest television audience to date.

== Immersive experiences ==
=== Illuminated Garden ===
The Illuminated Garden was commissioned by tech companies and took place in a park in Palo Alto, California. The performance followed the arc of the day, starting at noon and ending at midnight. The show was an interactive performance where the audience became the characters in the show, flying on the trapeze, climbing and crawling through interactive installations and investigating the world through a circus experience. Audience members' faces were projected onto a 16-foot tall video sculpture titled the PyramID. Velocity Circus scheduled a brief break for dinner, during which, the garden became illuminated in glow-in-the-dark LED lights. Audience members wore 3D glasses and walked through a 3-dimensional labyrinth, wading through grass reeds and flowers as floating aerial artists swung overhead in lit-up orbs.

=== Human logos ===
In a rebranding campaign, Mercedes-Benz and Univision commissioned Herrera to recreate their logos by using aerial artists to hang suspended in mid-air.

== Incidents and contentions ==
In 2015, Velocity Circus had a problem with their generator and an ice rink show had to be cancelled. Since then Lighting of the Embarcadero Ice Rink has only used Disney on Ice.
