= World Peace Prize =

International award

The World Peace Prize was established in 1989 by Robert L. Leggett, Suzi Leggett, and Dr. Han Min Su., and was registered the same year in Washington D.C. as the "World Peace Corps Mission, World Peace Corp Academy and World Peace Prize Awarding Council, Inc.," a non-profit missionary organization. The organization operates under the principles of inter-religious collaboration, and in the spirit of altruism and world peace.

== History ==
Robert L. Leggett was a nine-term United States Congressman. While visiting Korea in 1961, he met Dr. Han Min Su who was an elder clergyman of the Korean Christian churches. He was also an ex-public relations officer of Pacific Air Forces, and the author of Goodbye John. The two men became friends, and Congressman Leggett continued to be inspired by the faithful Christians in Korea. Inspired by the success of the United States Peace Corps initiated by U.S. President John F. Kennedy, the two co-founded the World Peace Corp Mission as a civilian organization co-opting the name and attempting to emulate the spirit of that program.

== Prize ==
Two awards are given - the Main Prize and the Top Honor Prize. The first Top Honor Prize was awarded to former U.S. President Ronald Reagan for "Winning the star wars against the Russia and the UAS National stability". The prize is not awarded every year; the next prizes were not issued until 1995. The Top Honor Prize has been issued posthumously to Mahatma Gandhi in 2003.

The prize has the stated intention to promote world peace and inter-religious understanding, and is awarded periodically to individuals considered to have contributed to the causes of world peace by preventing regional conflicts or world war; by settling the disputes of political, diplomatic and economic matters; or by developing new inventions to minimize threats and confusions within mankind. The prize's stated core spirit is to advance peace and justice and inter-religious collaborations.

== Controversy ==
In 1997, the award was presented to Taufa'ahau Tupou IV, King of Tonga. The group who presented the prize also said that they were going to provide Tonga with the world's first plant that would turn sea water into natural gas, which did not materialize. The Tongan government later said that they had been scammed, and the New York Daily News expressing mystification at the "elaborate and, so far as anyone can see, totally pointless hoax". According to R.G. Crocombe, the Korean government made the Peace Corps issue an apology to Tonga.

After Taiwanese Vice-President Annette Lu accepted the award in 2001, there was controversy about the World Peace Prize in the Taiwanese press. A spokesman for Lu denied that the prize was a hoax. Congressman Lester Wolff, the Chief Judge of World Peace Prize Award Council, held a press conference in Taipei where he showed what he said was a letter from the Prime Minister of Tonga apologizing for inaccuracies reported in the Tongan press. Wolff received the Top Honor Prize in 2011.

== Laureates ==
- Ronald Reagan, former President of the United States
- Mahatma Gandhi, pacifist and leader of the Indian independence movement
- Yitzhak Rabin, former Prime Minister of Israel
- Fidel Valdez Ramos, former President of the Philippines
- Yakubu Gowan, former President of the Republic of Nigeria
- Syngman Rhee, former (first) President of South Korea
- Abdurrahman Wahid, former President of Indonesia
- Punsalmaagiin Ochirbat, former President of Mongolia
- Hosni Mubarak, former President of Egypt
- Kuniwo Nakamura, former President of Palau
- Meles Zenawi, former Prime Minister of the Republic of Ethiopia
- Ben Gilman, former U.S. Representative
- Yi Yungao, Buddhist religious leader
- Hun Sen, Prime Minister of Cambodia
- D. Todd Christofferson, Latter-day Saint leader

== See also ==
- List of peace activists
