= Museum of International Propaganda =

Non-profit museum in San Rafael, California

The Museum of International Propaganda
- Established: 2016
- Location: 1000 Fifth Ave, San Rafael, California
- Coordinates: 37°58′28″N 122°31′37″W
- Founders: Tom and Lilka Areton
- Website: museumofpropaganda.org

The Museum of International Propaganda is a non-profit institution established in 2016 in San Rafael, California.

== Overview ==
The Museum of International Propaganda features a permanent collection of propaganda posters, paintings, sculptures, and artifacts from more than 25 countries. The main gallery showcases unique and educational images, representing the political art of various nations, including North Korea, Cuba, Nazi Germany, China, Iran, and the Soviet Union. Compiled over 30 years, these objects were predominantly designed and financed by various governments, dictators, and special interests with specific political goals. The non-profit museum's mission is to acquire, preserve, and exhibit political art produced during the 20th century. Through exhibitions, educational lectures, discussions, films, and writings, the museum aims to assist the public in understanding the significant impact that propaganda had on history, culture, and politics, projecting its influence powerfully into contemporary life.

== History ==
Founded by Tom and Lilka Areton, who have operated a non-profit student exchange program for almost 40 years, the museum's origins trace back to the couple's extensive travels, during which they collected political propaganda. Tom, having lived in socialist Czechoslovakia during his youth, and Lilka, who's traveled to the Soviet Union since 1960, were deeply influenced by their experiences. Tom's mother endured both Nazi and Communist propaganda for over 60 years. The couple met in 1969 at the International Center in New York, married, and relocated to Northern California in 1970.

Tom pursued film study at NYU and Law and Economics in San Francisco, while Lilka earned a PhD from San Francisco's Institute for Advanced Study of Human Sexuality. Their academic backgrounds led to the establishment of a student exchange nonprofit organization in 1977. Following the fall of communism in Eastern Europe in 1989, the Aretons acquired numerous artifacts that people were discarding.

The concept of the museum took shape in mid-2010 when the couple visited North Korea, Berlin, and Cuba. Tom and Lilka Areton transformed a former children's shoe store into the museum, personally designing exhibits and arranging objects that span the 20th and 21st centuries. Tom's daughter assisted in exhibit design, and Tom crafted all large-print display copy. Notably, a painting of Lenin, hanging above the reception desk, was discovered at a flea market in an abandoned soccer stadium in Warsaw. The museum also features a wristwatch, a gift for Chinese soldiers who participated in the 1989 Tiananmen Square massacre, alongside Chinese propaganda.

== Exhibitions ==
The museum's exhibits guide visitors through seven themes, techniques, and styles of propaganda:

1. Idealization of state leaders, portraying them with children, the military, and displaying their images nationwide.
2. Fear and intimidation tactics through physical detention, sudden disappearances, and extralegal executions.
3. Glorification of the nation, exaggerating prosperity, abundance, and the ecstatic happiness of the people.
4. Promotion of the common people, showcasing workers, women, peasants, and students as heroes.
5. Vilification, wherein governments identify central enemies—political opponents, religious and ethnic minorities, or economic groups—to blame and demonize.
6. Veneration of the military, with statues, posters, uniforms, and medals honoring national heroes and recalling past wars and struggles.
7. Post-1989 ridicule, criticism, and commercialization of past political systems, leaders, and ideas that once subjugated the people.
