= Laurel True =

American artist

Laurel True (born 1968) is an American artist, architectural artist, muralist and mosaic artist.

True, founder of one of the first formal mosaic institutes in the United States, Institute of Mosaic Art, was born in Ann Arbor, Michigan.

True's career began in 1990 with an apprenticeship with outsider mosaic artist Isaiah Zagar working on site-specific architectural mosaics and evolved into one focused on large-scale public and community mosaic projects. An instructor and lecturer in the US since the mid-1990s, True maintains an active studio practice and travels through her organization, The Global Mosaic Project, to work on public projects involving local communities.

She currently resides in Oakland, California.
