= Tony Foster (artist) =

British artist

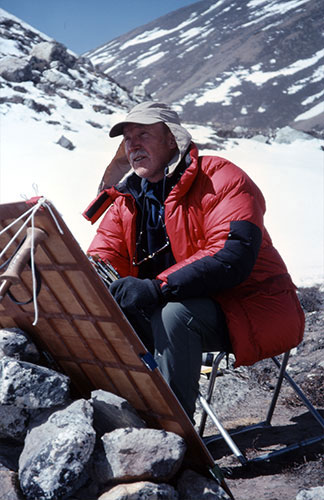
- Tony Foster painting Mount Everest, 2005
- Born: Richard Anthony Foster; 2 April 1946; New York, Lincolnshire, England
- Known for: Artist-explorer, Landscape art Watercolor painting
- Spouse: Ann (Partington) Foster
- Awards: 1994 Elected Fellow of the Royal Geographical Society, 2002 Cherry Kearton Medal and Award
- Website: tony-foster.co.uk

Richard Anthony Foster (born 2 April 1946), known as Tony Foster, is a British artist-explorer and environmentalist who documents wilderness landscapes worldwide through his large-scale artworks created on-site. The artworks are watercolour and graphite on paper and include diary excerpts, collected souvenirs, maps, and talismans. Since 1982, Foster has completed nineteen thematically related watercolour diaries or journeys.

== Early life ==
Tony Foster was born in New York, Lincolnshire, England, in 1946. He trained as an art teacher and taught for seven years before serving as a Regional Arts Officer for the South West Arts Council of Great Britain. He is a self-taught artist, initially working in mixed media and silkscreen as a pop artist. Inspired by the methodology of J. M. W. Turner, and Foster's interest and passion for wildernesses and painting en plein air, he chose to focus on his own narrative observations, making art a full-time occupation at age 35.

== Process ==
Foster works with graphite and watercolour paints and utilises the ‘en plein air’ technique. He blends 19th century British explorer traditions of making detailed notebook sketches of his travels while working in a large-scale contemporary format. Foster sketches on-site to achieve authenticity and never works from photographs because he believes a direct response is more important than photographic accuracy.

Trekking on foot, rafting, canoeing or scuba diving are some of the methods Foster employs to explore the natural landscape. He documents the experience of his travels, travelling slowly to encounter flora, fauna, people, and objects, recording it through diary notes and collected souvenirs which are essential elements of his artworks. To develop his paintings, some of which necessitate several weeks on-site, Foster frequently camps where he chooses to paint. He often contends with harsh climate conditions to complete his artworks.

Foster resolves about two-thirds of each painting on-site, leaving graphite notes on the paper for reference, then completes the work in his Cornish studio. These notes provide a revelation of his process and a record of decisions made in the field. The completed watercolour artworks include his diary entries, collected souvenirs, talismans, and maps, resulting in a visual and written record of Foster's encounters on his wilderness journeys.

== Career ==
Since 1982, Tony Foster has travelled worldwide and painted wildernesses, creating a series of ‘watercolour diaries’. He believes in the importance of wilderness and the need to protect it.

His artworks of the American West draw comparisons to expedition artists of the early West, such as Thomas Moran and George Catlin by art historian Mindy Besaw. Art historian Duncan Robinson states Foster's work demonstrates the mastery of the centuries-old tradition of English landscape, drawing comparison to John Linnell, John Constable, and Peter De Wint.

Foster's works have resulted in several major exhibitions.

== Collections ==
- Autry Museum of the American West, Los Angeles, CA
- Boise Art Museum, Boise, ID
- Denver Art Museum, Denver, CO
- Museum of Northern Arizona, Flagstaff, AZ
- Nevada Museum of Art, Reno, NV
- Phoenix Art Museum, Phoenix, AZ
- The Foster Museum, Palo Alto, CA
- Yale Center for British Art, New Haven, CT

== Awards ==
- 1988 Yosemite Renaissance Prize
- 1994 Elected Fellow of the Royal Geographical Society
- 2002 Royal Geographical Society Cherry Kearton Medal
- 2015 The Phoenix Art Museum West Select, silver medal for Works on Paper
- 2017 The Centre for Contemporary Art and the Natural World Award for Arts and the Environment

== Journeys ==
- 1982 Travels without a Donkey in the Cévennes. With photographer James Ravilious, Foster retraces the steps of Robert Louis Stevenson's 120-mile journey through the Cévennes mountains in south-central France as recounted in Stevenson's book Travels with a Donkey in the Cévennes (1879).
- 1984 Thoreau’s Country: Walks and Canoe Journeys in New England. Foster pays homage to Henry David Thoreau's following Thoreau's wanderings in Massachusetts, New Hampshire, and Maine.
- 1986–87 John Muir's High Sierra: A Watercolour Diary. Foster hikes the entire 211-mile trek of the John Muir Trail. This exhibition's appreciation of America's National Parks helps renew interest in John Muir and the formation of the John Muir Trust in Scotland.
- 1988–89 Exploring the Grand Canyon. Foster hikes 400 miles of trails in the Grand Canyon painting its views and geology. One artwork pays homage to watercolorist Gunnar Widforss.
- 1990–94 Arid Lands: Watercolour Diaries of Journeys across Deserts. Foster highlights the beauty of deserts in California, Nevada, Arizona, New Mexico, and Mexico.
- 1991–93 Rainforest Diaries: Watercolours from Costa Rica. Foster spends many months travelling and painting in the lush wilderness of untouched cloud forests in Costa Rica.
- 1993–94 Wilderness Journeys: Watercolour Diaries of the Idaho Rockies. Foster treks and paints in Idaho, revealing characteristics of each of the parallel ranges that make up the Rocky Mountains in Idaho.
- 1996–97 Ice and Fire: Watercolour Diaries of Volcano Journeys. Foster studies and paints erupting, active, dormant, and extinct volcanoes in his travels to Montserrat, Hawaii, the Andes, the Cascades, and California.
- 1998–99 After Lewis and Clark: Explorer Artists and the American West. Foster retraces the footsteps of Lewis and Clark in Montana, Idaho, and Washington, painting remaining wild places and examining the changing landscape.
- 1998–2002 WaterMarks: Watercolour Diaries from Swamps to Icebergs. Foster paints water in all its forms, including paintings of Arctic icebergs, Yellowstone National Park geysers, the swamps of Georgia and Florida, and the waterfalls of Guyana.
- 2002 The Whole Salmon. Foster rafts the entire 415-mile Salmon River and paints a watercolour each day to document his month-long journey.
- 2004–2007 Searching for a Bigger Subject: Watercolour Diaries from Everest and the Grand Canyon. Foster documents two of the world's natural wonders, Mount Everest and the Grand Canyon. He is the first person to paint all three sides of Mount Everest.
- 2006 Rocky Days. Foster documents a series of short hiking trips in Idaho's Rockies, including the Boulders, Pioneers, Alice Lake, and Shangri-la in the Sawtooths.
- 2009 Secret Sites. Foster paints the favourite remote sites of his Idaho supporters that sustain him on his journeys. Maps marking the locations remain sealed inside the framed artworks.
- 2007–15 Sacred Places: Watercolour Diaries from the American Southwest. Foster travels to the Four Corners region of the American Southwest to sacred sites of different cultures, including Native Americans, Catholics, New Age practitioners, and Mormons.
- 2007–15 Exploring Beauty: Watercolour Diaries from the Wild. Foster captures the beauty and wonder of inaccessible and endangered places across the globe. These locations were nominated by ‘luminaries’ and include world leading scientists, explorers, writers, environmentalists, and mountaineers: naturalist Sir David Attenborough, explorer Robin Hanbury-Tenison, Director Emeritus of Kew Botanical Garden Sir Ghillean Prance.
- 2018 Watercolour Diaries: Great Basin and Copper Basin. Foster studies and records his explorations in the Great Basin and Idaho's Copper Basin. This wilderness area is part of the Salmon-Challis National Forest with views of the Pioneer Mountains.
- 2018-23 Watercolour Diaries from the Green River. Foster explores and paints various locations on the Green River from its headwaters in Wyoming to its confluence with the Colorado River in Utah.
- 2007–25 Exploring Time: A Painter’s Perspective. Foster explores geological, biological, human and fleeting moments of time, spanning from 50 million years ago to the present, through watercolour artworks produced during extended expeditions to remote landscapes, including Mount Everest, the Calaveras Big Trees State Park in California, and the Grand Canyon in Arizona.

== Documentaries ==
- The Man Who Painted Everest (2006) – follows Foster during his expedition to paint watercolours in the Mount Everest region, produced as part of his Journey "Searching for a Bigger Subject".
- Tony Foster: Painting at the Edge (2025) – directed by David Schendel, released in cinemas on 14 November 2025. The film uses archival footage, interviews, and images of Foster’s expeditions to chronicle his life, creative process, and wilderness painting. It features an eight‑day canoe journey down the Green River to its confluence with the Colorado River in Utah, as well as other expeditions covering the full length of the Green River, and highlights key moments from his 19 documented Journeys.

== Special projects ==
- Artbox is one of England's smallest art galleries, housed in a repurposed British Telecom red phone box and located streetside in Tywardreath, Cornwall. Foster, who leases the phone box from his local council for £1 per year, is Artbox's patron and founder. He regularly collaborates with Roshni Tamang Mitchell and Dana Roberts to organise and rotate community-based exhibitions. Artbox can feature the work of contemporary artists or historical figures. The first exhibition, which opened in 2019, was a tribute to 19th century John Lobb, a Tywardreath farm labourer who became a royal bootmaker.
- Lockdown Diary–56 Days is a visual diary of experiences that Tony Foster recorded on his daily walks from home during a British lockdown in 2020 due to the COVID-19 pandemic. Foster took a new walk and painted a new subject every day while sheltering-in-place in Tywardreath, England. Foster relates that "Like John Muir, I have come to realise that anything studied intently enough will offer insights into the extraordinary variety and beauty of our world."

== Books ==
- Foster, Tony (2008). Painting at the Edge of the World: The Watercolours of Tony Foster. Seattle: University of Washington Press. ISBN 978-0-295-98817-7.
- Foster, Tony (2012). Sacred Places Portfolio: Watercolour Diaries from the American Southwest. Foster Art & Wilderness Foundation. ISBN 978-0-9961957-0-6.

== Catalogs ==
Tony Foster’s watercolour Journeys have been accompanied by exhibition catalogs published by museums and galleries; while some later catalogs carry ISBNs, many earlier publications were issued without them, which is common for exhibition materials.

- Thoreau’s Country: Walks and Canoe Journeys in New England (1985).
- John Muir’s High Sierra: A Watercolour Diary (1987).
- Exploring the Grand Canyon (1990).
- Rainforest Diaries: Watercolours from Costa Rica (1993).
- Arid Lands: Watercolour Diaries of Journeys Across Deserts (1995).
- Wilderness Journeys: Watercolour Diaries of the Idaho Rockies (1995).
- Ice and Fire: Watercolour Diaries of Volcano Journeys (1998).
- After Lewis and Clark: Explorer Artists and the American West (1999).
- Worldviews: The Watercolour Diaries of Tony Foster (2000).
- WaterMarks: Watercolour Diaries from Swamps to Icebergs (2003).
- The Whole Salmon: A Multidisciplinary Commission Project (2003).
- Searching for a Bigger Subject: Watercolour Diaries from Everest and the Grand Canyon (2008).
- Sacred Places: Watercolour Diaries from the American Southwest (softback, 2012). Exhibition catalog published by Foster Art & Wilderness Foundation. ISBN 978-0-9961957-2-0.
- Exploring Beauty: Watercolour Diaries from the Wild (2016). Exhibition catalog published by Foster Art & Wilderness Foundation. ISBN 978-0-9961957-1-3.
- Watercolour Diaries from the Green River (2023). Exhibition catalog published by The Foster Museum. ISBN 978-0-9961957-3-7.
- Exploring Time: A Painter’s Perspective (2025). Exhibition catalog published by The Foster Museum. ISBN 978-0-9961957-4-4.

== Personal life ==
He resides in Cornwall, United Kingdom, with his wife, Ann.

== Gallery of selected works ==
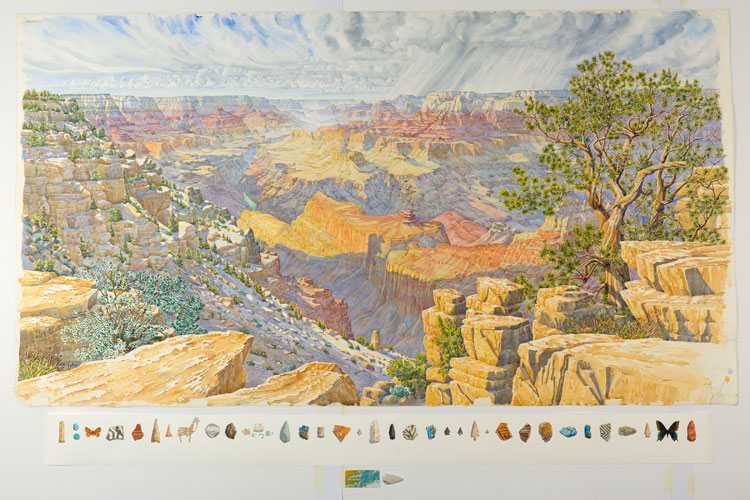
Twenty-Three Days Painting the Canyon—From West of Navajo Point, 2013

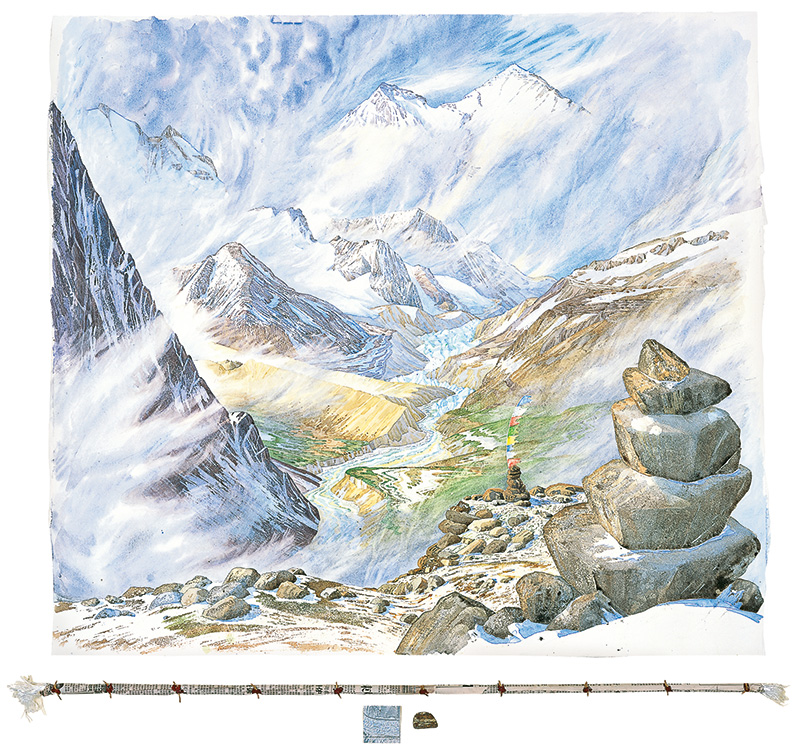
The East (Kangshung) Face of Everest from above the Kama Valley · 15400' 4670m, 2007

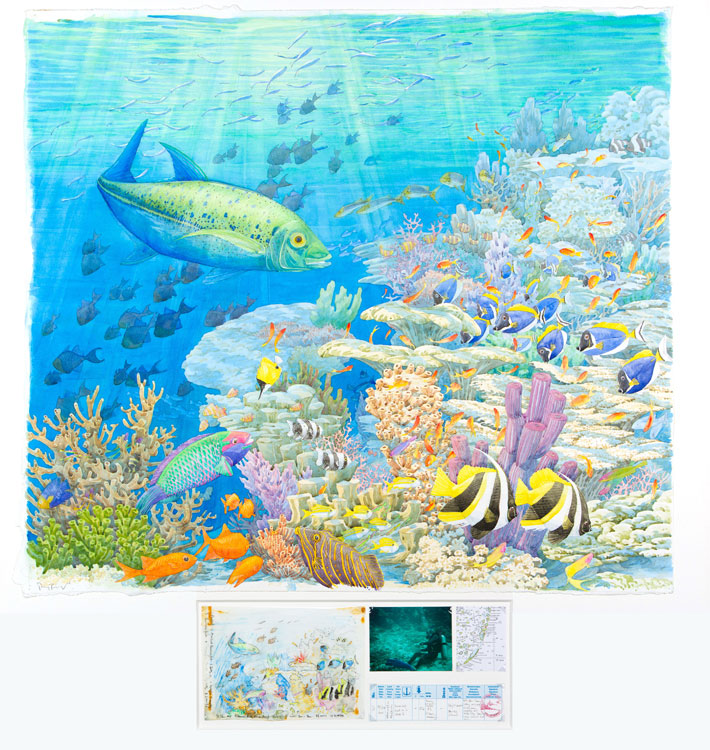
Vilamendhoo—Dive 20, 2004

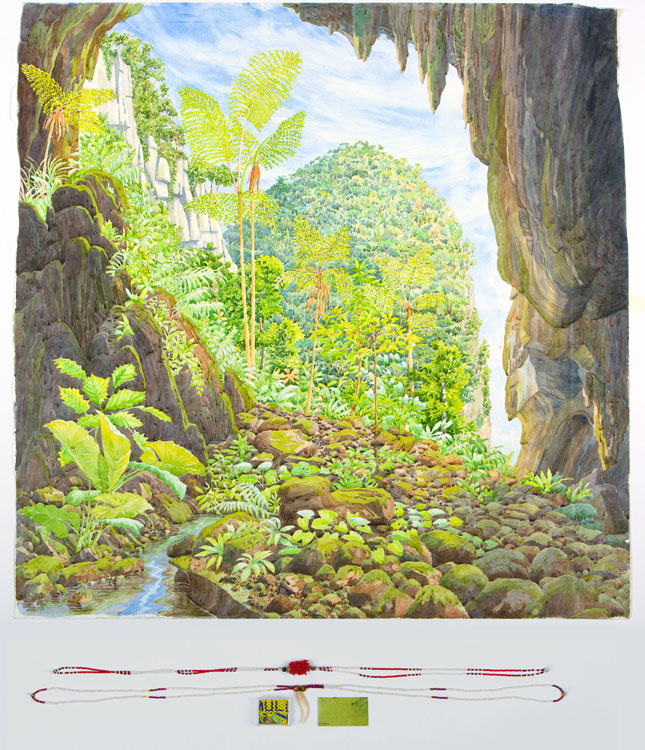
Looking Out from Deer Cave, Mulu—Six Days, 2015

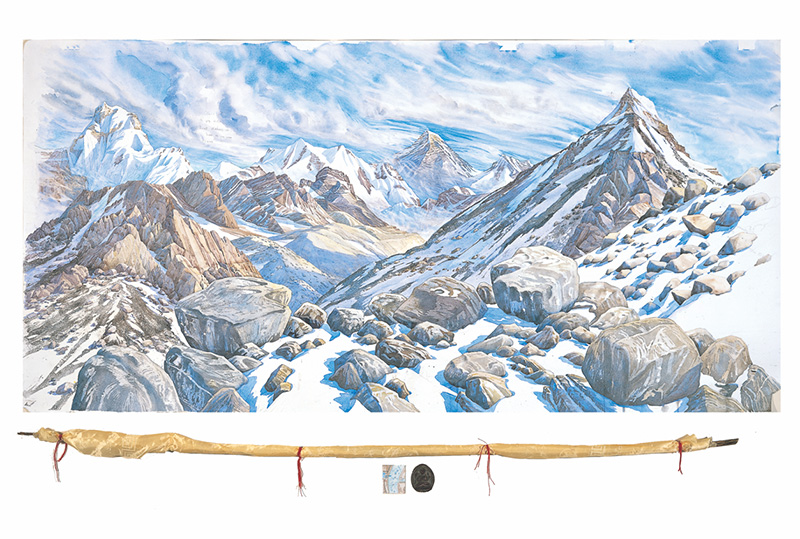
Looking East through Changri La to Everest from above Ngozumpa - Four Days at 17600' 5370m, 2005

== See also ==
- The Foster Museum, Palo Alto, California, United States
- List of single-artist museums
