= Le Petit Trianon =

Historic house in California, United States

- U.S. National Register of Historic Places
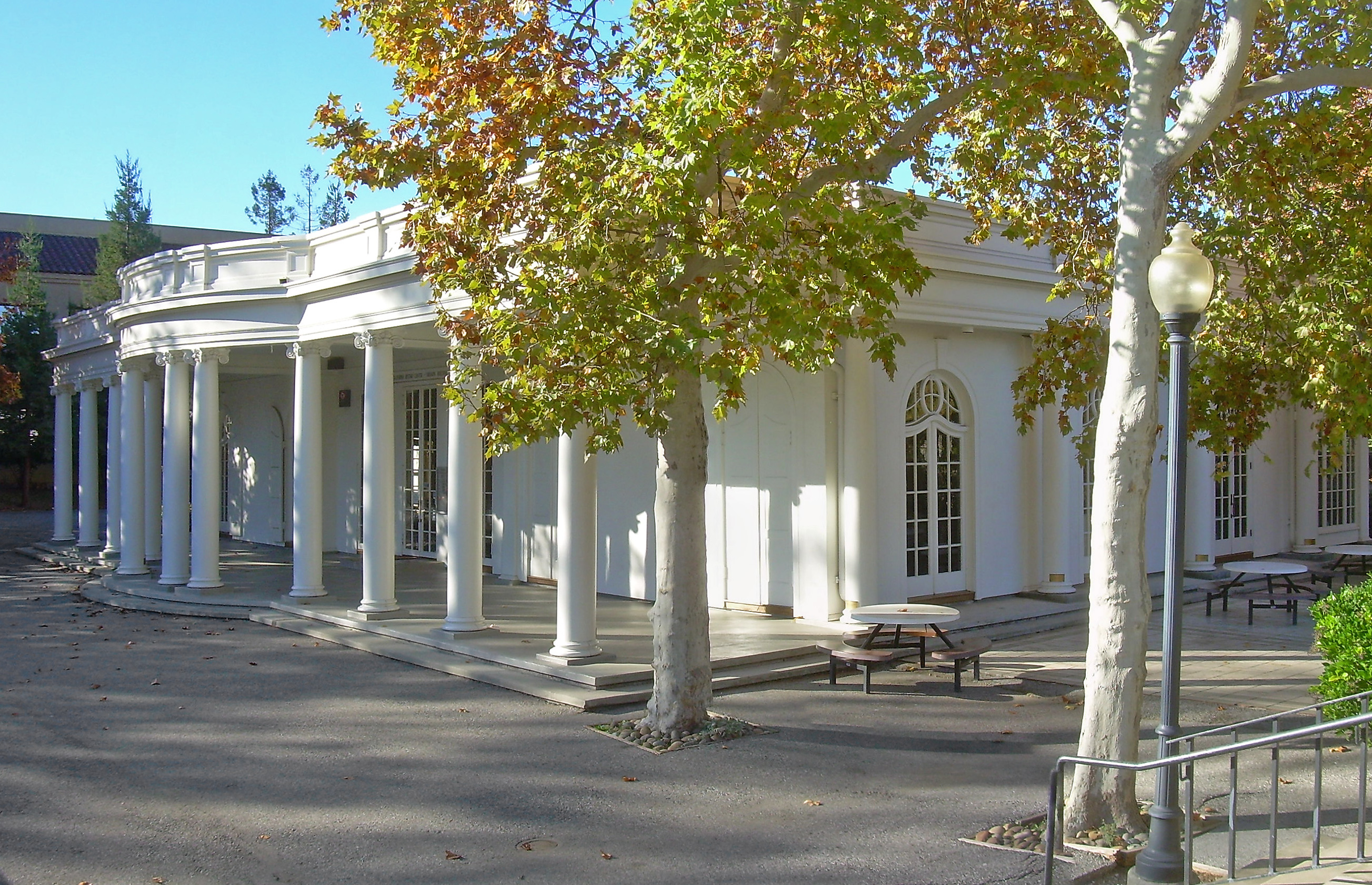
- View from the front corner

- Location within San Jose, California Location within California Location within the United States
- Location: De Anza College campus, Cupertino, California
- Coordinates: 37°19′18″N 122°02′48″W
- Area: 15 acres (6.1 ha)
- Built: 1892; 134 years ago
- Architect: Willis Polk
- Architectural style: Baroque Revival
- Restored: 1982
- Restored by: Trianon Foundation
- Website: www.deanza.edu/califhistory/petit.html
- NRHP reference No.: 72001552
- Added to NRHP: 15 November 1972

Le Petit Trianon is a historic mansion on the grounds of De Anza College at 21250 Stevens Creek Blvd. in Cupertino, California. The building now serves as the California History Center.

== History ==
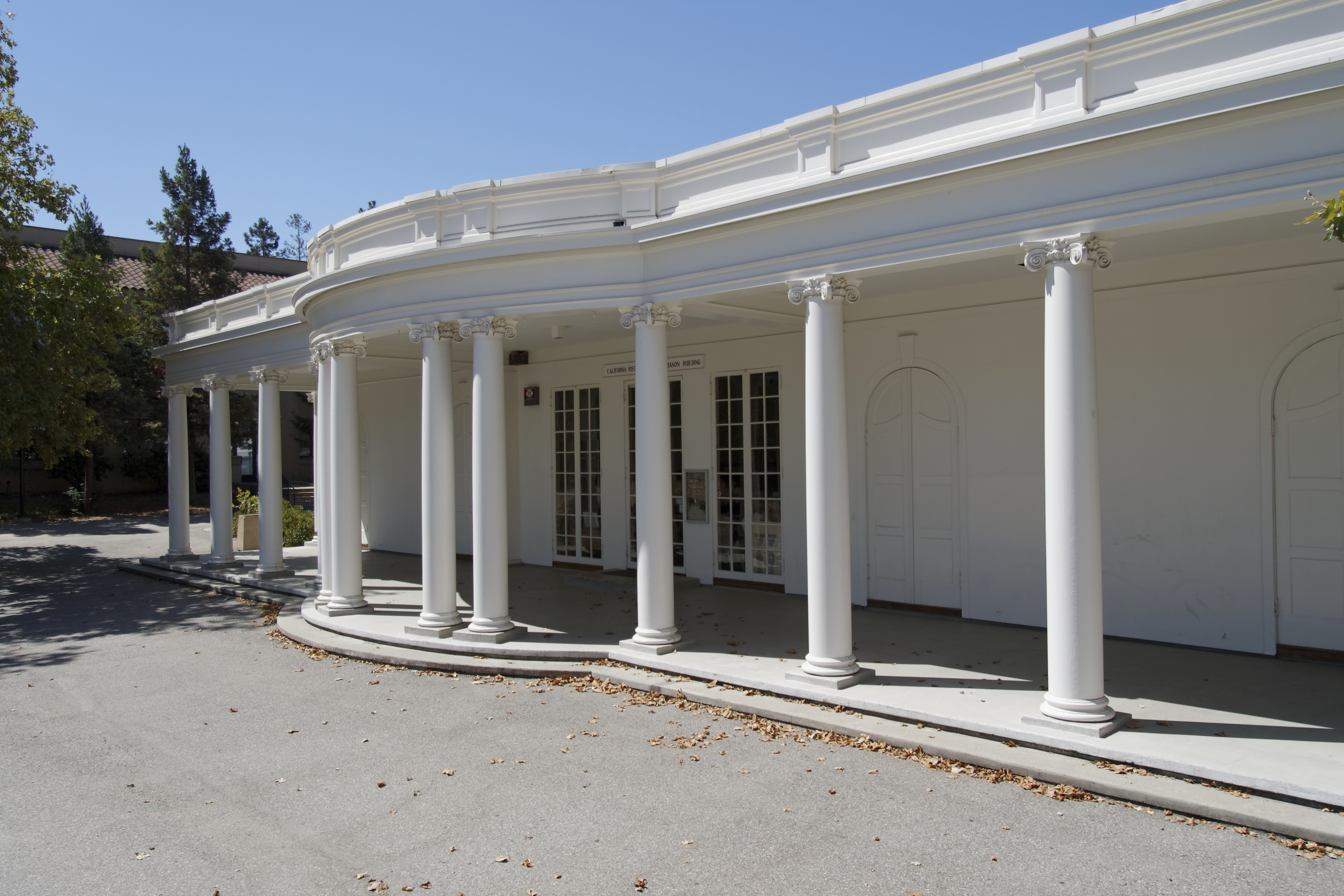
Front entrance in 2012

Built in 1892 for Charles A. Baldwin and his wife Ellen Hobart Baldwin, the mansion was once the center of their successful wine-producing estate where the couple was known to entertain lavishly. Baldwin installed a massive stone winery; built underground cellars (today part of the De Anza College grounds) and planted vines from Bordeaux and other regions of France. Under the label Beaulieu, Baldwin's wines were sold in New York City, London and Central America.

The design for Le Petit Trianon was drawn from classical French architectural motifs popular in America at the end of the 19th century. It is also the only example of "V" rustic redwood construction remaining in the area. The name Le Petit Trianon stems from its similarities to the architecture of the Grand Trianon, built for Louis XIV of France. Similar detail to this French precedent can be seen in Le Petit Trianon's columns, pilasters, windows and wood window shutters.

In 1909, the mansion was sold to Harriett Pullman Carolan, daughter of George Pullman, inventor of the Pullman sleeping car. Carolan also found the home a wonderful setting for elaborate social functions. In 1940, the house was sold to E. F. Euphrat, owner of the Pacific Can Company. Since 1965, the estate has been the site of De Anza College. Remnants of the garden remain; the winery is still there, as are the guest cottages.

The college district planned to demolish the house in 1968, but decided not to after protests by local historians. After its listing on the National Register of Historic Places in 1972, grant money for restoration was received, and the house was moved twice – first to make room for the Flint Center (theater) and next yielding to a parking lot. A restoration of the mansion was completed in 1982, and the house now serves as the California History Center.

== California History Center ==
The California History Center focuses on state history and the region. The center offers public exhibits, lectures and workshops. Classes are given with De Anza College.

The center's Stocklmeir Library and Archives features a collection of materials on California history and Santa Clara Valley's development, including student research papers, books, journals, oral histories, photographs, manuscripts, newsletters, clippings and pamphlets. Materials must be used on site.

== See also ==
- National Register of Historic Places listings in Santa Clara County, California
