= International Art Museum of America =

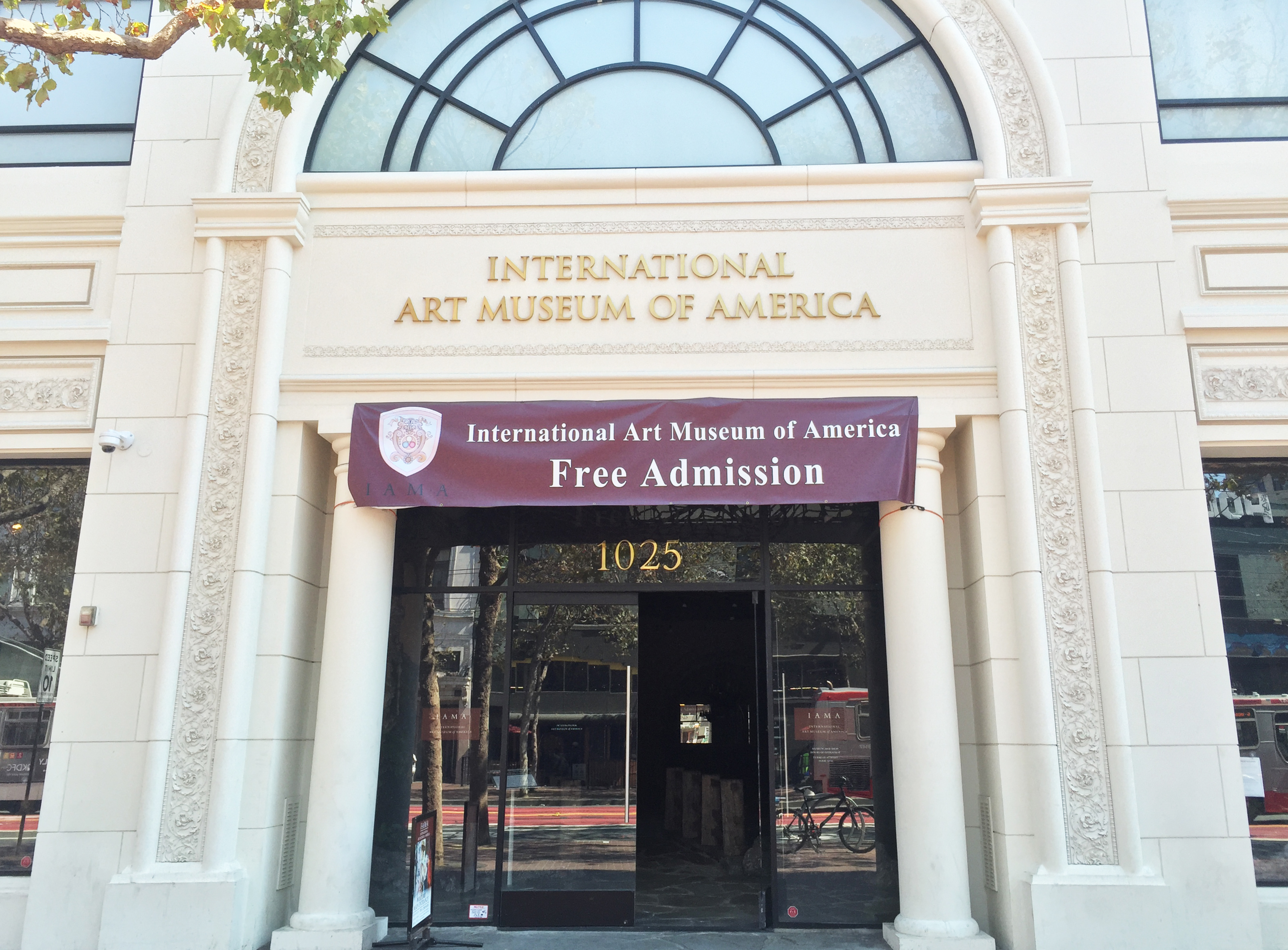
- Entrance to the museum on a day in 2016 when entrance was free
- Former name: Superb Art Museum of America
- Established: October 15, 2011
- Location: 1025 Market Street; San Francisco, California
- Coordinates: 37.78142°N 122.41070°W
- Type: Art museum
- Director: Dr. Loretta Huang
- Website: www.iamasf.org

→

The International Art Museum of America (IAMA), originally the Superb Art Museum of America, is an art museum located at 1025 Market Street between 6th and 7th Streets in the South of Market (SoMa) neighborhood of San Francisco, California. It was founded in 2011 by H. H. Dorje Chang Buddha III, an artist who claimed to be a reincarnation of the Buddha Vajradhara, and originally only contained works by him. In an interview with Huffington Post, Dyana Curreri-Ermatinger, the museum's director, denied that the museum was part of a cult, saying that its mission was "to provide a place that is serene and peaceful in the otherwise chaotic environment of Central Market".

The front entrance contains a permanent garden installation with a pond, a waterfall, imitation rock formations, a pagoda-roofed gazebo, and a tree house sculpture designed by artist Steve Blanchard.

== Collection ==
Chinese artists included in the permanent collection

- Yongzheng Emperor (1678-1735)
- Fu Baoshi (1904-1965)
- H.H. Dorje Chang Buddha III (1951-2022)
- Huang Zhou (1925-1997)
- Qi Baishi (1864-1957)
- Wu Changshuo (1844-1927)
- Xu Beihong (1895-1953)
- Zhang Daqian (1899-1983)

European artists included in the permanent collection

- Rosa Bonheur (1822-1899)
- Evariste Carpentier (1845-1922)
- David Martin (1737-1797)
- Léon Germain Pelouse (1838-1891)
- Charles Dorman Robinson (1847-1933)
- Sir Martin Archer Shee (1769-1850)
- Frits Thaulow (1847-1906)
- Daniel Vertangen (1598-1684)
- Maurice de Vlaminck (1876-1958)
- Dirick Wyntrack (1625-1678)
