= Yi Yungao =

Chinese-American Buddhist leader (1951–2022)

Yi Yungao (simplified Chinese: 义云高; traditional Chinese: 義雲高; pinyin: Yì Yúngāo; Jyutping: Ji6 Wan4gou1; born Wenjiang District, Sichuan in 1951- January 22, 2022), also known as Wan Ko Yee (the Cantonese version of his name using Western name order) and Dorje Chang Buddha III (第三世多杰羌佛), was a Chinese-American artist, Buddhist religious leader and self-declared third reincarnation of Dorje Chang (Vajradhara), a claim not universally accepted and doubted by many Buddhists.

He had many wealthy followers in Hong Kong, Taiwan, Thailand and China. In 1999, he moved to the United States and lived with his family in Pasadena, California, where he would live until his death in 2022 from natural causes. In addition to his Vajradhara claim, Yi also said that he was the second reincarnation of Vimalakirti and had performed miracles.

== Art ==
In March 2015, "Ink Lotus", a painting by Yi, sold for $16.5 million at public auction. In 2012, two paintings by Yi sold for $230,000 and $330,000. Greg Brown, an art appraiser with an emphasis in Asian art, expressed puzzlement at the sudden increase in value of works by Yi. Greg Brown was quoted by LAist as suggesting that followers of Yi were purchasing his art. A spokesman for Yi said that profits from sale of Yi's artwork were donated to charity.

In 2011, the International Art Museum of America opened in San Francisco, California. It originally only featured works by Yi. There is also a H.H. Dorje Chang Buddha III Cultural and Art Museum in Covina, California, whose mission is "to promote the superb accomplishments of an American with outstanding talent, H.H. Dorje Chang Buddha III, by displaying his achievements in culture, literature, philosophy, art, science, technology, and other fields."

== Awards and lobbying ==
He has been praised by several United States politicians, including the late Congressman Tom Lantos and Los Angeles County supervisors Hilda Solis and Michael D. Antonovich. Congresswoman Judy Chu presented a certificate to Yi in the past, but has said that she is "deeply disappointed" that the certificate "given under a different name and different circumstances [to Yi], is being used to mislead people." In June 2011 former Congressman Lester L. Wolff presented Yi and former Congressman Ben Gilman with the World Peace Prize. According to public records, Yi's followers have spent $120,000 lobbying members of Congress to pass resolutions honoring Yi and his family. In 2008, the International Buddhism Sangha Association paid lobbyist Robin Raphel $10,000 to arrange for Congresswoman Corrine Brown to introduce a resolution recognizing Yi as the "true incarnation of the primordial Buddha".

== Chinese government ==
The Chinese government has said that Yi is wanted for fraud, to the value of 60.8 million renminbi. A warrant was issued by Interpol for Yi's arrest, which was withdrawn in 2008. According to a spokesman for Yi, both people who have accused him of fraud have withdrawn their claims. Peter Schey of the Center for Human Rights & Constitutional Law, who acted as Yi's lawyer, has stated the Chinese government levelled the charges against Yi for political reasons.

On September 10, 2013, police in Changchun, Jilin, suspended an illegal religious gathering of over 100 people whose visiting preacher was affiliated with Yi.

== See also ==
- Buddhism in the United States
- Buddhism in the West
