= The Foster Museum =

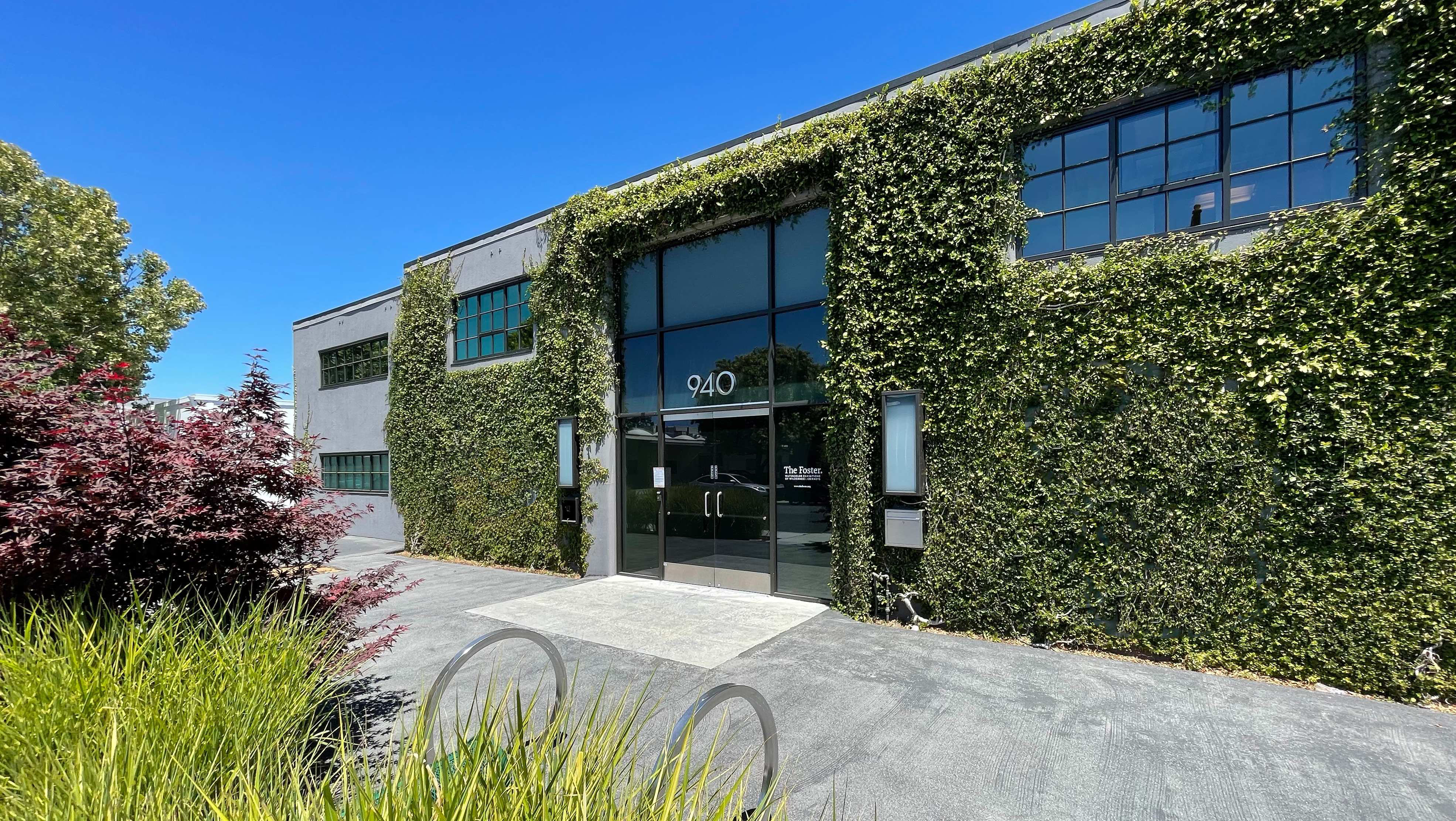
- The Foster Museum Exterior
- Established: 2016
- Location: 940 Commercial Street; Palo Alto, California
- Coordinates: 37.42369758681669°N 122.09966616895191°W
- Type: Art museum
- Public transit access: Caltrain: San Antonio Station VTA: Line 21
- Website: www.thefoster.org

The Foster Museum is a private non-profit single-artist museum located in Palo Alto, California, United States dedicated to the watercolor wilderness Journeys of artist-explorer Tony Foster (1946–). It houses the permanent collection of the Foster Art & Wilderness Foundation and opened to the public in 2016, offering free admission by appointment.

== History ==
Formerly the ambulance storage facility for Lucille Packard Children's Hospital at Stanford until 2014, the 14,000 square foot building was then redeveloped to house The Foster Museum. This project was awarded LEED silver certification from the USGBC. The museum opened in 2016 to unite and share complete Tony Foster Journeys, and inspire connection to both Foster's art and the natural world.

== Exhibitions ==
- The Foster Museum Orientation, (February 2016 – current)
- Exploring Beauty: Watercolour Diaries from the Wild, (January 2017 – current)
- Sacred Places: Watercolour Diaries from the American Southwest, (February 2016 – current)
- Retrospective Exhibition: The Art of Tony Foster, (February 2016 – current)

== Archives ==
The museum maintains and collects the archives surrounding Tony Foster's watercolor wilderness Journeys.

== See also ==
- List of single-artist museums
