= Museum of Modern Mythology =

Museum of pop culture brands

Coordinates: 37.7863°N 122.40174°W

The Museum of Modern Mythology was a museum of pop culture brands located in San Francisco, California. The museum opened in 1982, and closed in 1989 after its building was damaged beyond repair in the Loma Prieta earthquake.

== History ==
=== Founding ===
The Museum of Modern Mythology (MoMM) was founded in 1982 by Ellen Havre Weis, Jeffrey Errick and Matthew Cohen. Advertising character artifacts collected by Jeffrey Errick were the genesis of the collection. It was first located in Fisherman's Wharf, San Francisco, where it became a tourist draw.

=== 1982–1989 ===
The MoMM grew to display 3000 objects from the advertising history of the United States. Advertising characters represented in the collection included the Pillsbury Doughboy, Frito Bandito, Col. Sanders, Cap'n Crunch, Mr. Clean, Mr. Peanut, Mr. Bubble, Charlie the Tuna and the Jolly Green Giant. In a 1988 interview with the New York Times, Weis said that "The premise of the museum is that these characters quite literally enter our subconscious... They have to be studied for their mythological merit. They are inherent archetypes that we're all familiar with already."

In 1986 the MoMM created a hall of fame for living advertising characters. The first inductees were Clara Peller, who asked "Where's the Beef?" in Wendy's television commercials, and the real life Mrs. Olson, Virginia Christine, from Folgers Coffee commercials.

=== Closure and legacy ===
After the Loma Prieta earthquake on 17 October 1989, the museum's building was condemned. A few days later, the museum was given two hours to clear the building of its contents.

In the 1990s the museum tried unsuccessfully to find a new location to house its collection.

Following a 2021 agreement, much of the museum's collection is to be moved to the Valley Relics Museum in Van Nuys, California.
