= Casa Peralta =

Historic house in California, United States

- U.S. National Register of Historic Places
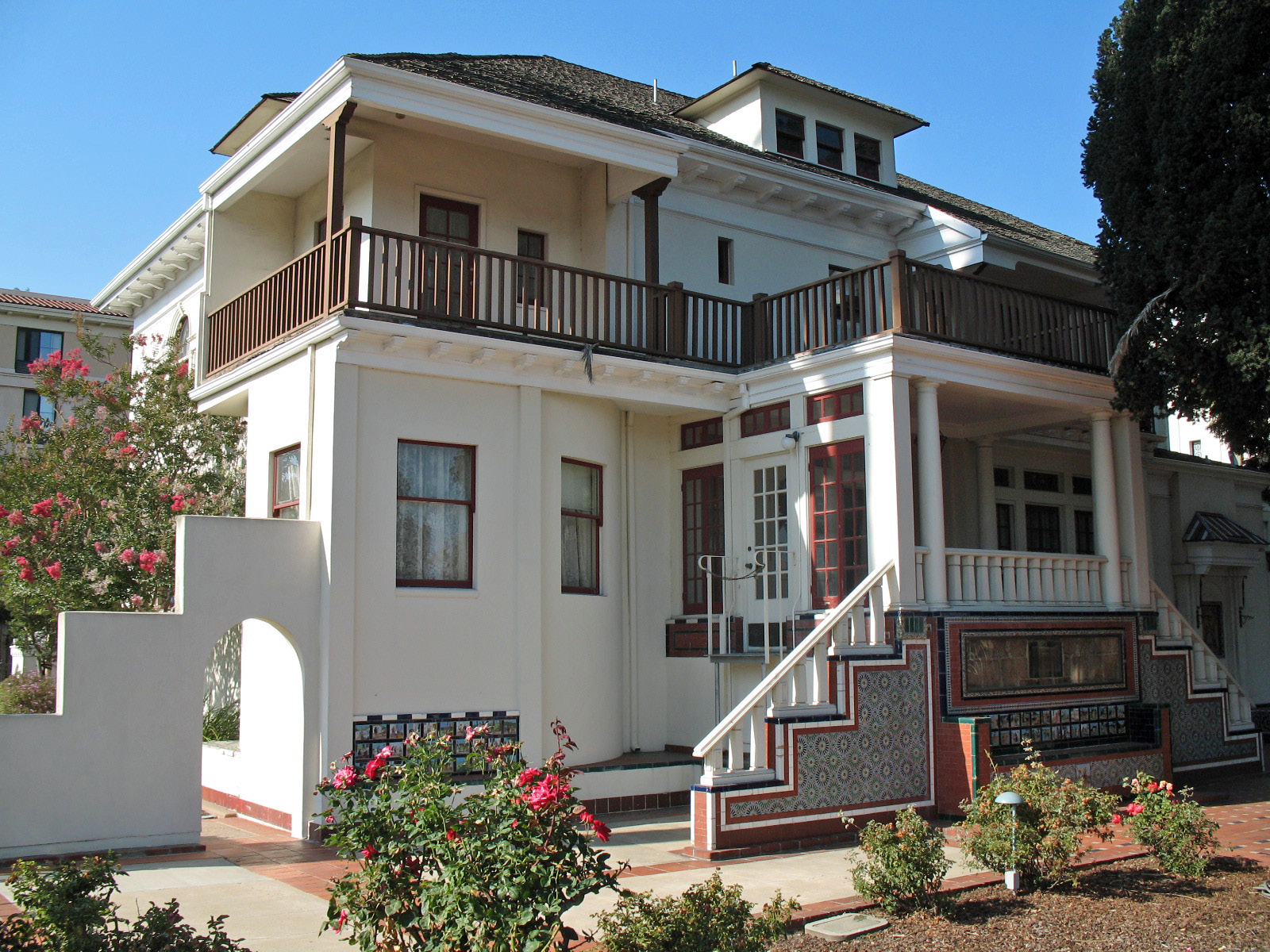

- Location within Oakland, California Location within California Location within the United States
- Location: 384 W. Estudillo Ave., San Leandro, California
- Coordinates: 37°41′47″N 122°9′25″W
- Area: 0.8 acres (0.32 ha)
- Built: 1901
- Architects: Martin, Antonio
- Architectural style: Colonial Revival, Spanish Renaissance
- NRHP reference No.: 82002168
- Added to NRHP: January 4, 1982

Casa Peralta is a historic home located at 384 W. Estudillo Ave. in San Leandro, California. The home was built in 1901 by Ludovino Peralta and originally had a Colonial Revival design. The original design included Tuscan columns, modillions, and a dentillated cornice, features which remain a part of the home. After Ludovino died, the home passed to her sister Maria and later to her niece Hermania Peralta Dargie. In 1927, Hermania hired Captain Antonio Martin to redesign the house in the style of the Peralta family's estate in Spain. Martin's design added a formal garden with a fountain, a front porch with tiles depicting scenes from Don Quixote, and a four-story tower.

The house was added to the National Register of Historic Places on January 4, 1982. It is now a historic museum run by the City of San Leandro.
