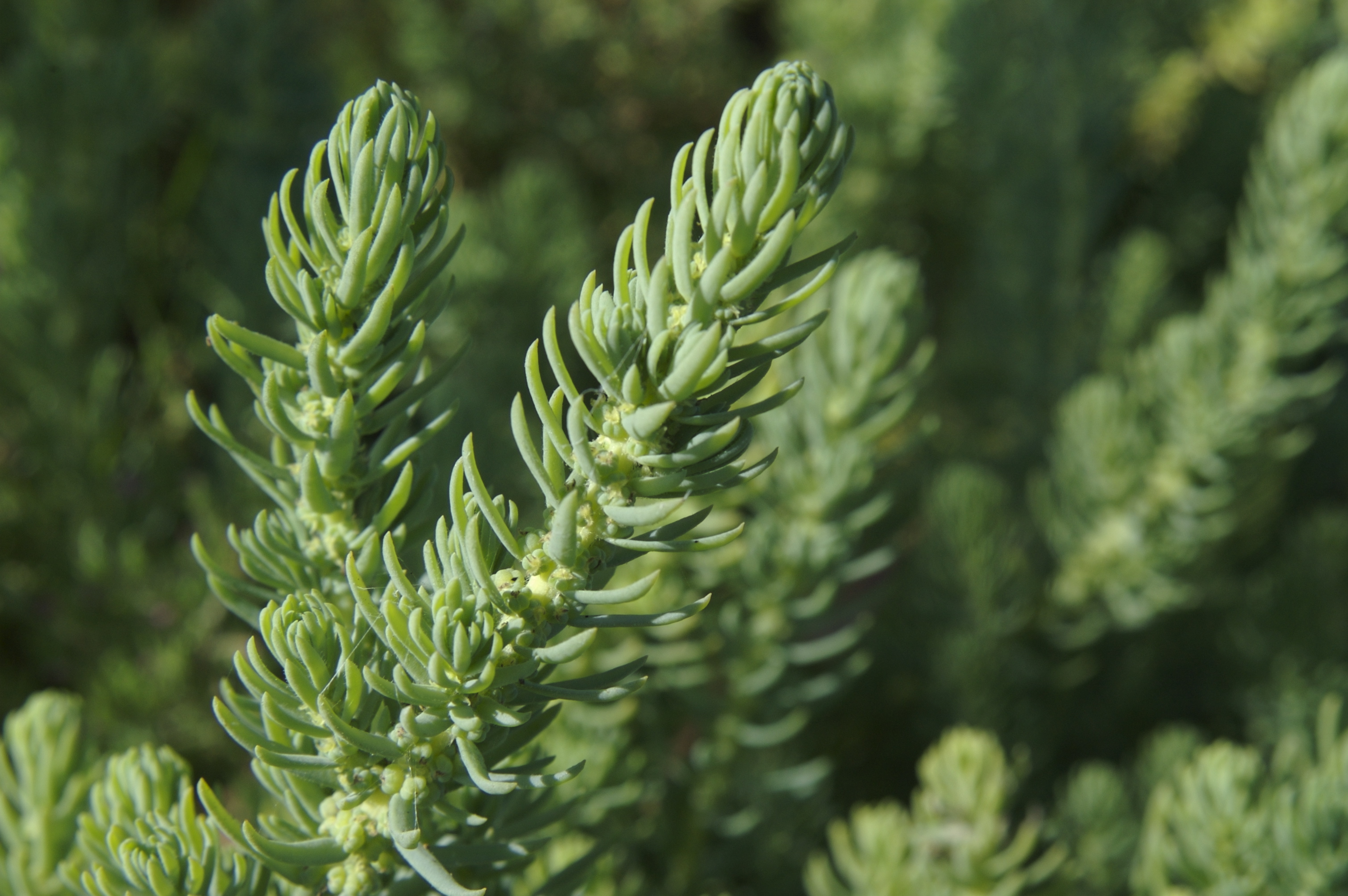

Conservation status
- Critically Imperiled (NatureServe)

Scientific classification
- Kingdom: Plantae
- Clade: Tracheophytes
- Clade: Angiosperms
- Clade: Eudicots
- Order: Caryophyllales
- Family: Amaranthaceae
- Genus: Suaeda
- Species: S. californica

Binomial name
- Suaeda californica S.Watson

Synonyms
- Dondia californica (S.Watson) A.Heller; Suaeda californica var. californica S.Watson

= Suaeda californica =

Species of aquatic plant

Suaeda californica is a rare species of flowering plant in the amaranth family known by the common name California seablite. It is now endemic to San Luis Obispo County, California, where it is known from a few occurrences in the marshes around Morro Bay. Historical populations around San Francisco Bay have been extirpated, though it has been reintroduced to multiple sites in the area.

== Description ==
Suaeda californica is a mound-shaped shrub up to 80 centimeters tall with hairless or slightly hairy succulent green or red-tinged herbage. The woody stems have many branches which are covered with the knoblike bases of old leaves. Between these grow the new leaves, which are lance-shaped and up to 3.5 centimeters long. The flowers occur between the leaves, all along the stems. Each cluster has 1 to 5 flowers and is accompanied by a leaflike bract. The calyx is a cone of fleshy, rounded sepals, and there are no petals. The fruit is an utricle that grows within the calyx.

== Habitat ==
This rare plant, Suaeda californica, grows in a restricted area within the intertidal zone of salt marshes. It is threatened by anything that alters the hydrology of the area, such as changes in sedimentation, including dredging, erosion, and recreation. It requires a porous substrate high in nitrogen, which may come from decaying plant matter and bird droppings. Invasive plant species such as introduced ice plant threaten remaining occurrences and reintroductions.

== Endangered status ==
It once occurred around the San Francisco Bay, but any historical populations there are now extirpated. Some carefully tended populations have been planted as re-introductions at locations around the San Francisco Bay. It probably once grew along the Petaluma River north of the bay, as remains of the species have been found in adobe bricks there. By 1991 the total remaining number of individuals was estimated to be below 500, and the plant was federally listed as an endangered species of the United States in 1994.
