= De Anza College =

Community college in Cupertino, California, US

Coordinates: 37°19′9″N 122°2′43″W

- Type: Public Community college
- Established: 1967; 59 years ago
- Parent institution: Foothill-De Anza Community College District
- President: Omar Torres (resigned) David Wain Coon (interim)
- Faculty: 234 full-time, 424 part-time
- Administrative staff: 21 administrators, 264 classified staff
- Students: 16,396 (Winter 2025)
- Location: Cupertino, California, U.S.
- Campus: 112 acres (45 ha)
- Nickname: Mountain Lions
- Website: www.deanza.edu

De Anza College is a public community college in Cupertino, California, United States. It is part of the Foothill-De Anza Community College District, which also administers Foothill College in nearby Los Altos Hills, California. The college is named after the Spanish explorer Juan Bautista de Anza.

== Academics ==
Student demographics as of Fall 2023
Race and ethnicity	Total
Asian	36%
Hispanic	28%
White	17%
Filipino	5%
Multiracial	5%
Unknown	5%
African American	3%
Pacific Islander	1%

The average class size at De Anza is 35, and approximately 2,800 students transfer per year. It also attracts a heavy international student population.

== Transfer Pathways ==
Student demographics as of Fall 2023
Race and ethnicity	Total
Asian	36%
Hispanic	28%
White	17%
Filipino	5%
Multiracial	5%
Unknown	5%
African American	3%
Pacific Islander	1%

De Anza College is among California's leading community colleges for university transfers, sending students to University of California and California State University campuses each year. Academic planning resources support students in navigating the course requirements associated with these transfer pathways. These include Cherrypicker, a sophisticated student-developed transfer planning platform for California community colleges, also currently operating for Foothill College students.

=== Puente Project ===
The Puente Project is a program offered at De Anza that helps underserved students transfer to 4-year institutions. "Puente" means "bridge" in Spanish, which symbolizes the "bridging" of students to higher educations due to the program. Puente is made up of three key components: English, individualized counseling, and individual mentoring. Puente students transfer from De Anza at a much higher rate than non-Puente Latino students—61% of De Anza's Puente students transfer within six years.

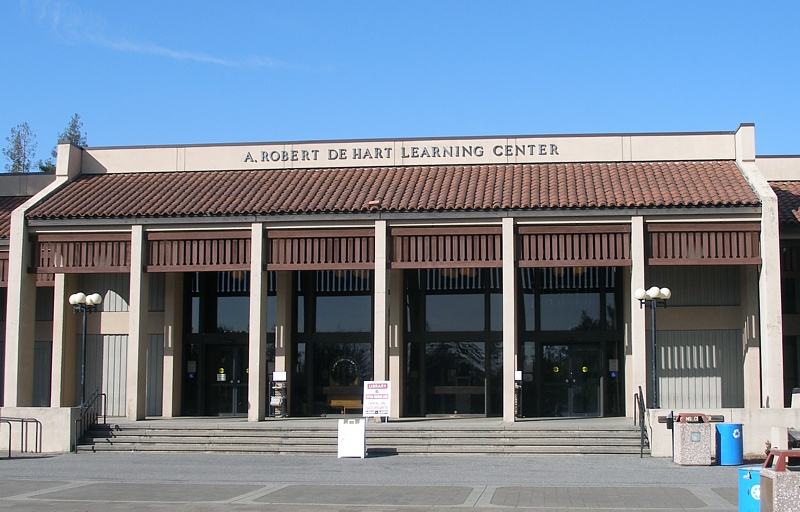
A. Robert De Hart Learning Center

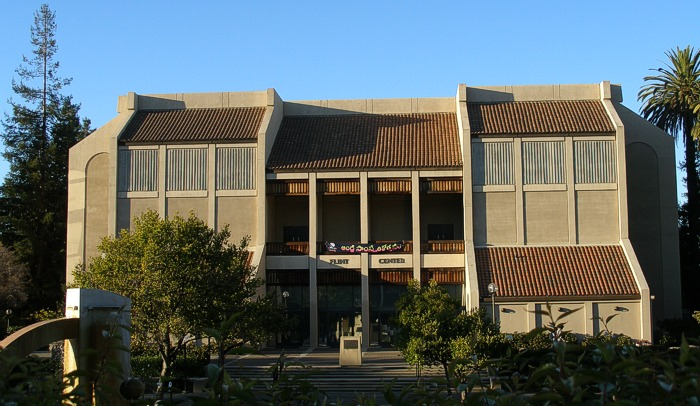
Flint Center, the main auditorium

=== Career Technical Education ===
The school provides applied technology programs including automotive technology and design and manufacturing. The school also provides environmental studies, such as energy management, resource management, pollution prevention, and wildlife science.

=== Vasconcellos Institute of Democracy in Action ===
Formerly called the Institute of Community and Civic Engagement, the Vasconcellos Institute of Democracy in Action (VIDA) is the community service learning and civic engagement office. VIDA coordinates Community Learning Partnership's work at De Anza.

Established as the ICCE in fall 2005, It was initiated by then new president, Brian Murphy and was led by faculty members Jackie Reza and Cynthia Kaufman. In 2015 the ICCE was renamed VIDA in tribute to John Vasconcellos.

== Buildings on campus ==
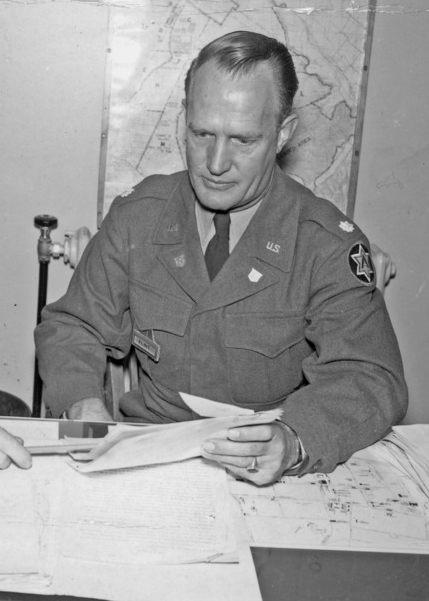
Calvin Flint was heavily involved in the creation of DeAnza College.

=== The Flint Center for the Performing Arts ===
The Flint Center is De Anza's main theater, seating about 2,400 people, and hosts concerts, Broadway shows, dance and speaking events. Each year, De Anza invites several celebrities and dignitaries for public speaking engagements. Construction began in 1968 and the building was dedicated in 1971 as the Calvin C. Flint Center for the Performing Arts, named after the District Superintendent and first Chancellor, The Flint Center also has classrooms and was home to the Film and TV department in its early years.

Steve Jobs introduced the original Macintosh in a January 1984 press conference in the center (which was recreated in 2015 for the movie Steve Jobs) and the iMac in 1998. In January 1985, Jobs came back to Flint Center to introduce the LaserWriter laser printer and its built-in PostScript technology, which launched the desktop publishing revolution of the 1980s. The Foothill DeAnza Board has voted to close the Flint Center and tear it down. The last event in the facility was June 22, 2019.

=== Euphrat Museum of Art ===
The mission of the Euphrat Museum of Art is to stimulate creativity and an interest in art among audiences of all ages.

Hank Baum wrote in the California Art Review:

"Established with a bequest by E. F. Euphrat in memory of his wife Helen, the gallery opened its doors in 1977. . . [it] is also the site for lectures, poetry readings, performances, discussions, and special community events.

"In addition, Director Jan Rindfleisch presents exhibits that address philosophical and social issues, challenge taboos, and allow artists to be resurrected who have been obscured by the prejudice of their day.

"The wide range of the gallery's interest is reflected in the titles of some past exhibitions 'Commercial Artists: Their Art,' '1981 International Year of Disabled Persons,' Men and Children,' 'The Workplace/The Refuge,' 'Realism in Painting and Color,' ' Survey of Bay Area Sculpture,' "It's Electric, ' ' Art that Rolls and Flies,' and the 'Lyle Tuttle Tattoo Art Collection'."

Rita Felciano noted in her review of the 1987 The Power of Cloth,"The Euphrat... puts together exhibits from the outside—events that usually have some bite to them."

In the 1990 Art around the Bay: a guide to art galleries and museums in the San Francisco Bay Area, Paul Monaco and Murwani Davis wrote:

The Euphrat Gallery has distinguished itself as an outstanding community center for visual arts... presents the works of some of the finest painters and sculptors of the Americas, the Far East and Europe.

The changing exhibitions attain national and international stature. Director/Curator Jan Rindfleisch aims for thought-provoking shows that conceptualize art in relation to ideas and cultural developments. Shows include "Art of the Refugee Experience," "Drawing From Experience: Artists Over 50," and a contemporary painting show called "Paintforum".

While this 'small, plucky gallery' maintains a high professional identity, it does not neglect its education mission. The Euphrat combines education programs with both elementary and secondary school programs, with hands-on work by professional artists.

=== California History Center in Le Petit Trianon ===
The college is the home of the California History Center, housed in a mansion called "Le Petit Trianon".

=== Visual and Performing Arts Center ===
The Visual and Performing Arts Center opened on March 6, 2009 and was built with an art exhibit and also a 400-seat performance and lecture hall that can be rented by De Anza College organizations and outside community groups.

=== Kirsch Center ===
The Kirsch Center opened in 2005 and was the first community college building in the US to receive a LEED platinum rating.

A 17-year effort, the Kirsch Center was conceived and is operated by De Anza faculty, staff and students.

Over 100 environmental classes are taught in the Kirsch Center. In addition to classrooms and labs, students can work in self-paced programs at special open study stations throughout the building.

A few examples of what the building features are:

- Solar panel roof
- Advanced natural ventilation
- Raised floor for gentle air distribution and flexibility
- Natural day lighting
- Orientation and layout for energy efficiency and passive solar benefits
- Water conservation and water runoff control
- Radiant heating and cooling
- Native species landscaping

The building is a favorite location for policy makers, school officials, student groups, Silicon Valley entrepreneurs to visit and utilize for conferences and for tours.

The building was a 10 million dollar project that was funded by various groups including the student senate, Morgan Family Foundation, and Steve and Michele Kirsch Foundation.

=== Fujitsu Planetarium ===
The Fujitsu Planetarium, with its 50-foot dome and seating for 139, teaches De Anza students, field trip groups, and the public. It also includes an evening musical laser light show on its Saturday public schedule from September to April. Its optical-mechanical projector was installed in 2007, and the new digital projection system was installed in 2016. The planetarium was built in the early 1970s and was named the Minolta Planetarium until 2008.

=== Outdoor artwork ===
- "La Vita E Una Fontana" or "Life is a Fountain" by Salvatore Pecoraro December 1, 1991
- "Longevity Turtle" by Elwood Martin Reynolds, donated by Dr. and Mrs. Alvin Rutner
- "Time Graffiti" by David Middlebrook, 1997. donated by Mrs. Rena Frabony DeHart in memory of De Anza College Founding President A. Robert DeHart.

=== Cheeseman Environmental Study Area ===
This is a 1.5-acre (0.61 ha) natural garden containing some 400 species of plants representing 12 California natural communities. It is located next to the Kirsch Center on the southeast corner of campus, and it was built by a group of De Anza students and faculty in 1971, after having received a US$12,000 grant.

The 12 plant communities are:

- Freshwater marsh and pond
- Coastal sand dunes
- Coastal redwoods
- Foothill woodland
- Grassland
- Conifers
- Channel islands
- California desert
- Coastal sage scrub
- Chaparral
- Riparian
- Xeric display

Students and visitors can learn about California's natural heritage and see plants and animals in person. Students can also conduct environmental research here and deepen their appreciation for California's biological richness.

== De Anza Associated Student Body ==
The association is required by law to "encourage students to participate in the governance of the college". It participates in meetings sponsored by a statewide community college student organization named Student Senate for California Community Colleges. The statewide Student Senate is authorized by law "to advocate before the Legislature and other state and local governmental entities".

=== De Anza Flea Market ===
The student body association also operates the De Anza Flea Market held on every first Saturday of a month. The flea market began as a small effort by the students of De Anza College to raise money for the student body over 30 years ago and has grown into an established community event attracting vendors and patrons from throughout the state. it is still a student enterprise with the De Anza Associated Student Body paying for all of the expenses and gaining approximately $300,000 annually for a variety of programs, services and events at De Anza College. The De Anza Flea Market contains about 825 vendor stalls and usually sells out very quickly. If the weather is good the flea market will draw approximately 15,000 to 20,000 shoppers.

=== New mascot ===
In 2020, De Anza adopted a new mascot after students voted overwhelmingly the previous year to retire the Don, an outdated symbol that many students had never even seen. The Mountain Lion was chosen in December by the college mascot working group, which included DASB student representatives, student-athletes and coaches, after extensive input and campus-wide participation.

== Police and crime ==
De Anza College has its own district police department with armed officers. The department was not a POST participating agency. In 2001, the campus police departments at De Anza and Foothill College were merged to become the Foothill-De Anza College District Police.

=== Averted shooting ===
On January 29, 2001, Kelly Bennett, 18, an employee at a Longs Drugs store in San Jose, was developing photos for Al DeGuzman, 19, a De Anza College student, when she noticed that many of his photos were of guns and bombs as well as of DeGuzman himself posing with said weapons. She called the police, who arrived at the store and waited for DeGuzman. He was arrested when he returned for his photos.

Shortly after DeGuzman's arrest, police executed a search warrant on DeGuzman's parents' home in San Jose, where he lived at the time. Inside DeGuzman's bedroom, police found bags filled with homemade explosives including Molotov cocktails and pipe bombs, as well as numerous guns, including a semi-automatic rifle and a cut-down 12-gauge pump-action shotgun. In addition, plans were discovered for a noon attack at De Anza the next day.

Over 10,000 students and over 1,000 staff were evacuated from De Anza the next day out of fear that DeGuzman had already possibly planted bombs on campus, although none were found. In the following weeks, Bennett was praised and credited with averting a massacre; she appeared on local news, Good Morning America and the Today Show.

DeGuzman was initially sentenced to seven years in prison after most of the charges against him were thrown out. However, appeals by prosecutors resulted in a resentencing of 80 years in prison. Several months after his resentencing, DeGuzman died in prison after hanging himself in his cell.

=== Gang rape investigation ===
In 2007, the Santa Clara County Sheriff's Office investigated an inquiry into allegations of gang rape of a 17-year-old unconscious female student, arising from an off-campus party on March 4, 2007, by eight members of the De Anza College baseball team. Several witnesses had allegedly seen the victim and intervened. On June 4, 2007, Santa Clara County District Attorney Dolores Carr announced that no charges would be filed. This decision was questioned, and the Office of the Attorney General was invited by the prosecutor to perform an independent investigation of the available evidence. On May 2, 2008, the attorney general's office announced that no charges would be filed.

== Athletics ==
Men's sports	Women's sports
Baseball	Badminton
Basketball	Basketball
Cross Country	Beach Volleyball
Football	Cross Country
Soccer	Soccer
Swimming & diving	Swimming & diving
Track & field	Track & field
Water Polo	Volleyball
	Water Polo

== Notable alumni ==
- Patrick Ahrens, California Assemblyman for the 28th district
- Doug Cosbie, former National Football League tight end
- Robertson Daniel, National Football League cornerback
- Will Davis, Alliance of American Football cornerback
- Mervyn Fernandez, former NFL wide receiver
- Ron Gonzales, former mayor of San Jose
- Teri Hatcher, actress
- Joe Prunty, professional basketball coach
- Steve Jobs, former CEO of Apple Inc., concurrently enrolled as a senior at Homestead High School
- Anjelah Johnson, former National Football League cheerleader and comedian
- Craig Juntunen, former Canadian Football League quarterback
- Titus Kaphar, American contemporary painter and 2018 MacArthur Genius Award recipient
- Christina Kim, Ladies Professional Golf Association pro
- Alexander Lee, former member of popular South-Korean boy band, U-KISS
- Evan Low, former California Assemblyman for the 28th district
- Jeannie Mai, host of the Style Network's popular and Emmy-nominated show, How Do I Look? and one of the co-hosts on The Real
- Frank Manumaleuga, former National Football League linebacker
- Joe Murray, Emmy Award-winning creator of Rocko's Modern Life and Camp Lazlo
- John Ottman, film composer and editor, received Academy Award for editing on Bohemian Rhapsody
- DJ Patil, Former chief data scientist of the United States
- Bill Pecota, former Major League Baseball player
- Rock M. Sakura, Drag Performer
- Jeff Sevy, former National Football League offensive tackle
- Paul Soriano, Filipino commercial and film director and producer
- Jhonen Vasquez, cartoonist
- Len Wiseman, film director
- Steve Wozniak, American computer engineer, co-founder of Apple Inc.; attended but did not graduate

== See also ==
- California Community Colleges system
- Foothill College, a sister community college in the same college district, located in Los Altos Hills
- Cañada College, a community college located in Redwood City
- College of San Mateo, a community college located in San Mateo
- Evergreen Valley College, a community college located in San Jose
- San Jose City College (SJCC), a community college located in San Jose
- Skyline College, a community college located in San Bruno
- West Valley College, a community college located in Saratoga
