= The EcoCenter at Heron's Head Park =

Education center in San Francisco, California, US

Coordinates: 37°44′23″N 122°22′31″W

The EcoCenter at Heron's Head Park is an environmental education facility located at 32 Jennings Street in the Bayview–Hunters Point neighborhood of San Francisco, California.

== History ==
Designed to meet the needs of underserved Bayview-Hunters Point communities in southeast San Francisco, the EcoCenter at Heron's Head Park is a unique educational facility that combines environmental education, experience-based learning and habitat restoration. Located by the bay in one of the last of San Francisco's wild landscapes, the EcoCenter is also a model for green building and sustainable resource use.

As a living classroom and drop-in visitor center, the EcoCenter demonstrates how environmental resources can be used to promote healthy people, vigorous ecosystems, and strong economies in local communities. To enhance community-building, the EcoCenter offers elementary school through college educational programming, internships for youth and young adults, tours, seminars, workshops, and other activities, all free of charge.

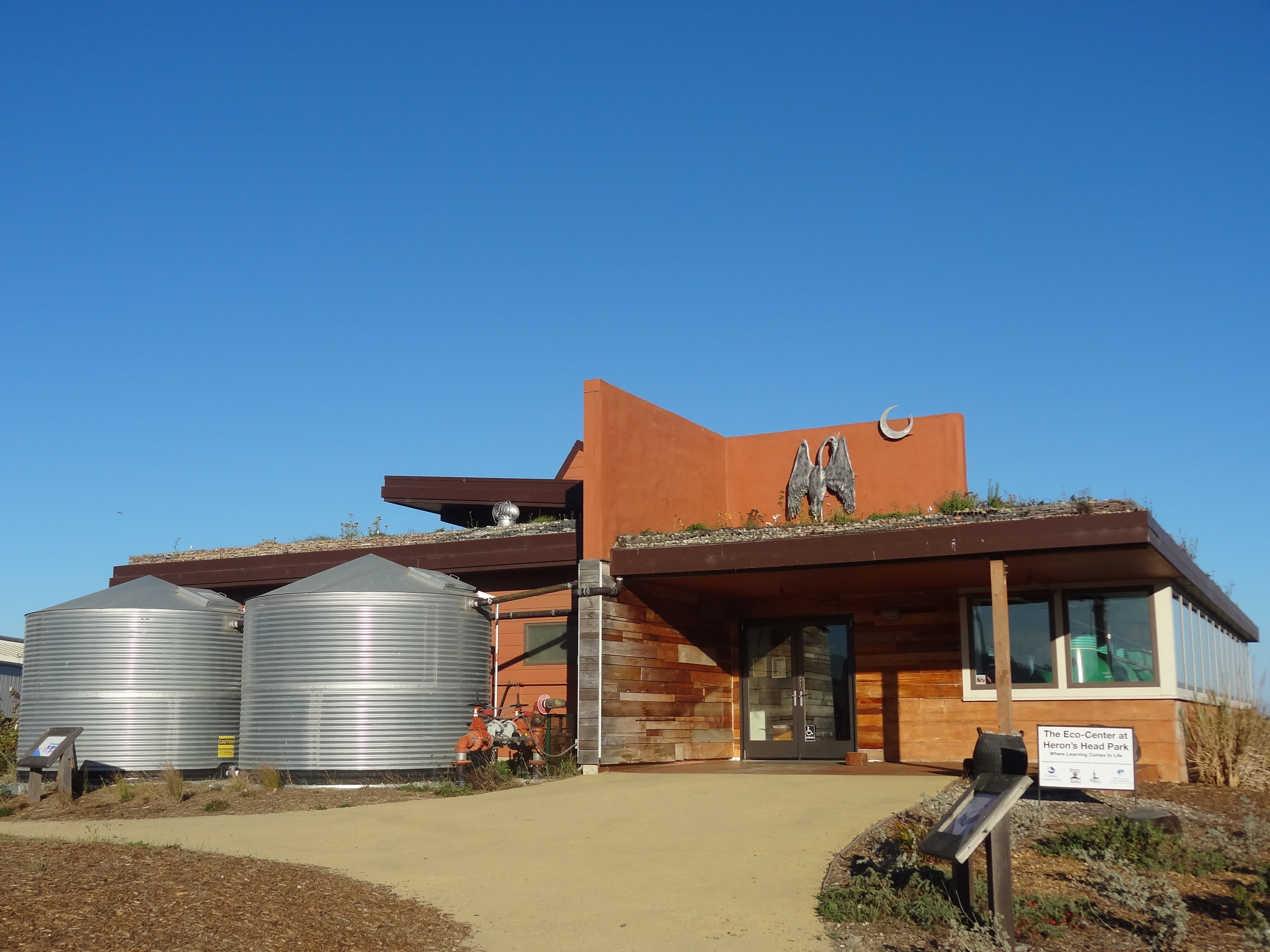

The EcoCenter's Science Saturdays program is a series of weekly events appropriate for all ages. These hands-on activities range from park restoration and plastic debris cleanups, to climate change science experiments, to healthy cooking and eating demonstrations, and to citizen science field trips. Other ongoing activities include a unique opportunity for place-based green jobs training. Youth interns monitor onsite wastewater treatment, nurture a constructed wetland, participate in rainwater harvesting, and maintain renewable energy systems. Volunteers and guests are invited to join the staff for hands-on experiences with native plants, landscaping, and habitat restoration. By learning more about urban design that mimics natural processes, visitors better understand the connections between sustainability in the built environment and the local wetlands. They leave the EcoCenter inspired to pursue green resource use in their everyday lives.
