= Coyote station =

Rail station in California, US, 1869–1959

Coyote
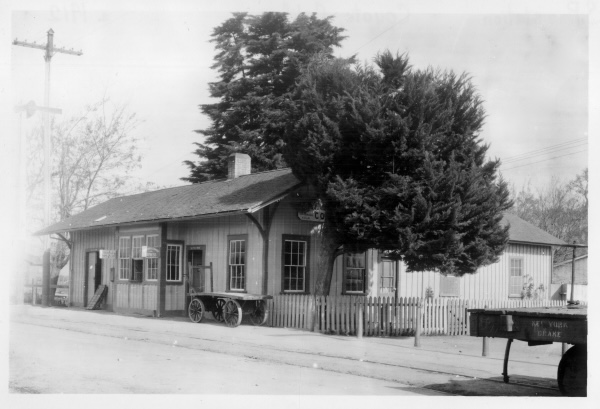
- Coyote station, c. 1912

General information
- Location: Monterey Road; Coyote, California, U.S.
- Coordinates: 37°13′0″N 121°44′26″W
- Line: Coast Line
- Platforms: 1 side platform
- Tracks: 1

History
- Opened: 1869
- Closed: 1959
- Original company: Santa Clara & Pajaro Valley Railroad

Services
Preceding station	Southern Pacific Railroad	Following station
Edenvale toward San Francisco	Coast Line	Perry toward Los Angeles
Location

Coyote station was a railroad depot in Coyote, California, United States. Established in 1869, the station was part of the Southern Pacific Railroad's first line connecting San José and Gilroy. Located in the heart of the Coyote Valley, the depot took its name from the Coyote Creek and explorer Juan Bautista de Anza who referred to the area as "Arroyo del Coyote." The train station was in use until the cancellation of the train route in 1959. In May 2024, Coyote station was relocated to History Park at Kelley Park in San José. The building will be restored and made into a transportation museum, subject to funding.

== History ==
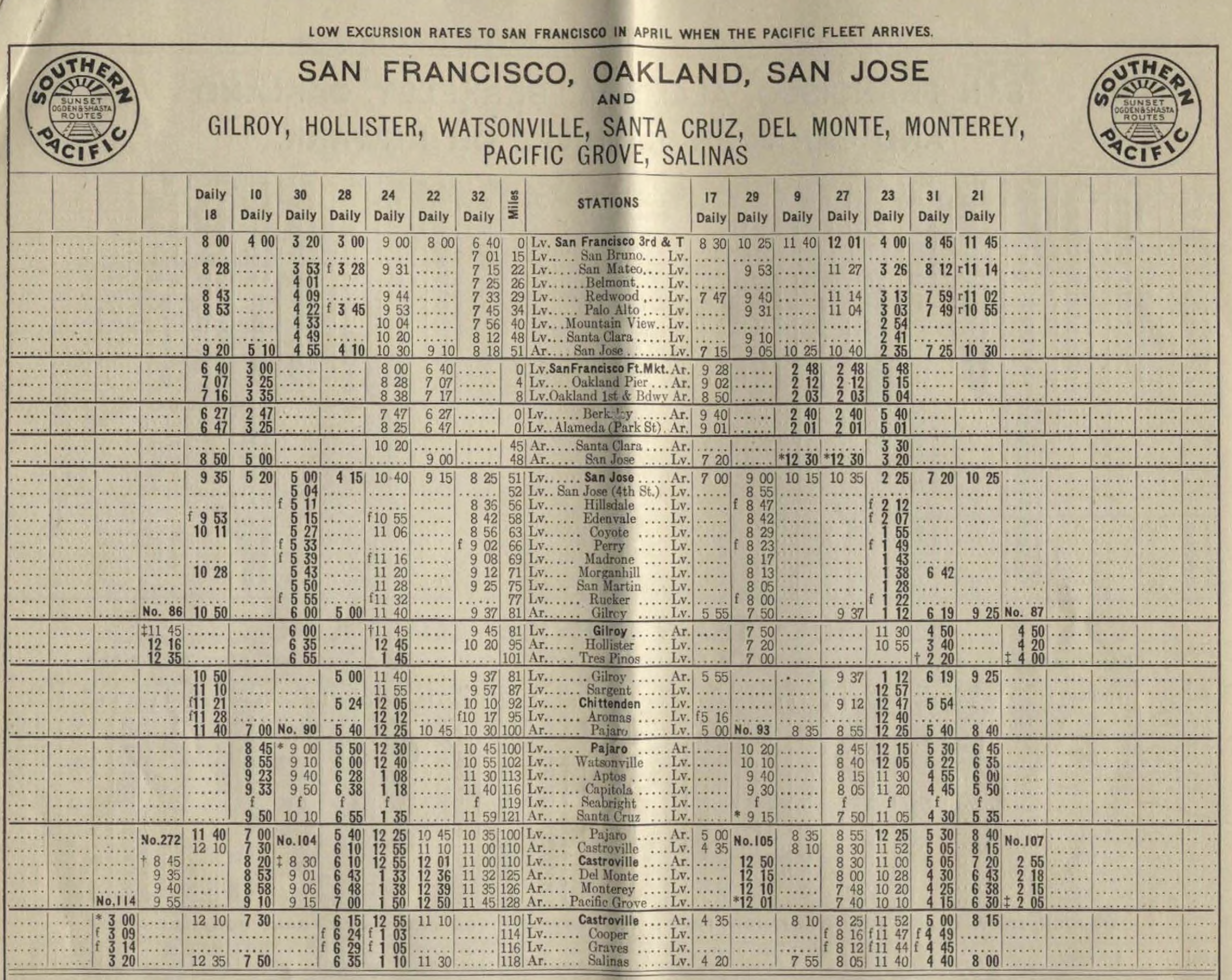
1908 Southern Pacific Timetable

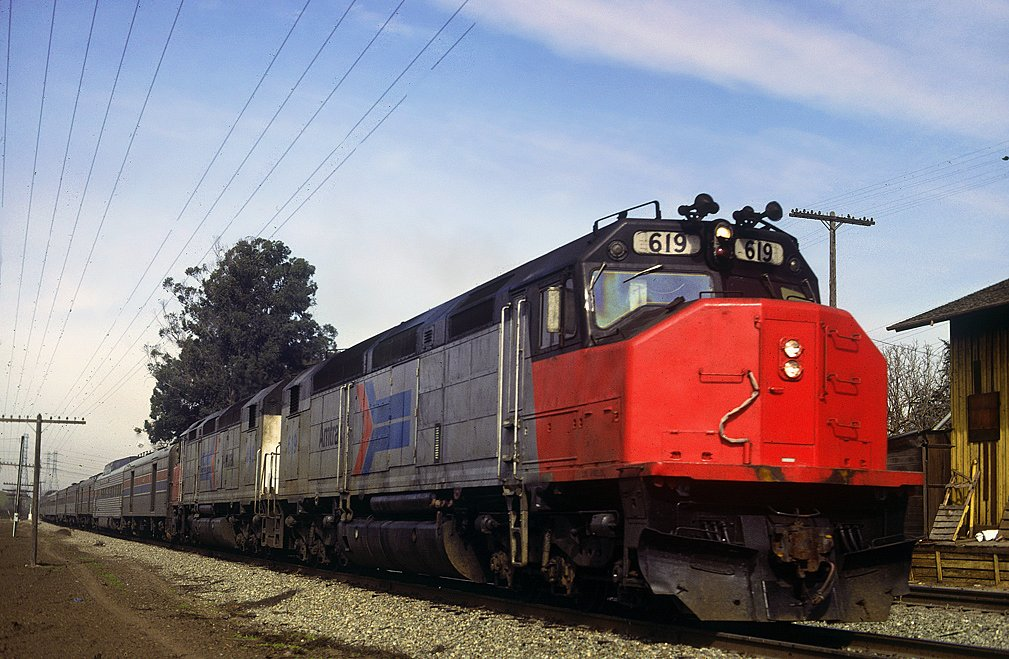
Amtrak 619 at Coyote

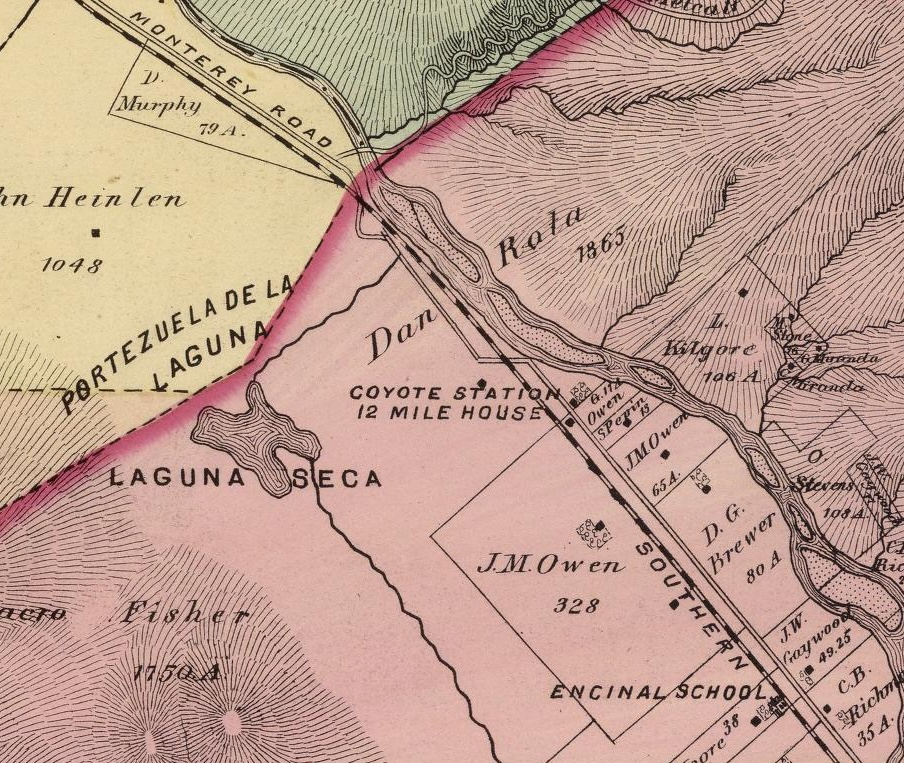
Coyote station and 12 Mile House can be seen along Southern Pacific Railroad and Monterey Road on the 1876 Thompson & West Map of Santa Clara County.

On April 8, 1869, the Santa Clara & Pajaro Valley Railroad (SCPVR) began the first freight and passenger service from San Francisco between San José, passing through Coyote Valley, to reach Gilroy. This happened just before the completion of the first transcontinental railroad on May 10, 1869. A year later, the SCPVR line was acquired by Southern Pacific Railroad.

The Southern Pacific Railroad built the Coyote railroad depot in 1869, running through the center of the Burnett Township and connecting San José, Coyote, and Gilroy. The station depot was located along Monterey Road near the two-story Twelve-Mile House, built in 1858, and the Coyote Post Office, which opened on April 30, 1862. This area served as a regular stagecoach stop for the Butterfield Overland Mail route between San Francisco and St. Louis, Missouri in the 1860s.

A Coyote freight depot and water tank and tower were located next to the train station. The Southern Pacific Railroad named its depot and freight shed "Coyote" after the nearby Coyote Creek and explorer Juan Bautista de Anza referred to the area in 1776 with the Spanish spelling "Arroyo del Coyote."

The 760 square feet (71 m^{2}) Coyote depot catered to the large farming community in Coyote Valley. SP's daily trains stopped in Coyote to transport the valley's produce to market. Farmers brought their cattle, milk, and fruit to the station for the trip to San Jose. Initially, the building consisted only of a passenger waiting area and a ticket office. A place to store baggage was later added. Due to the station's remote location, a residence was built for the depot agent and their family. The depot agent became the railroad's representative, answering questions about departure schedules and freight charges. Additionally, the depot agent ran the telegraph, taking orders via wire and passing them on paper to trains that passed by. A Western Union operated an office at the station stop.

There were several train crashes at or near Coyote station. On September 5, 1883, a collision at Coyote station occurred on the Southern Pacific Railroad between north and southbound freight trains. Due to dense fog, a northbound train struck a southbound train while attempting to reverse onto a side track. Both trains were damaged, being estimated at $20,000. Several of the train cars were destroyed and two breakmen suffered injuries. On December 12, 1890, a collision took place on the Union Pacific Railroad near Coyote station involving two freight trains. A westbound train collided into an eastbound train on the same track. One brake man died, and two others sustained serious injuries. Almost all the cars of both trains were damaged.

On March 7, 1913, the E. B. and A. L. Stone Company filed with the California Railroad Commission a petition to require the Southern Pacific Railroad to construct a rail spur at Coyote station to serve a proposed rock, gravel, and sand quarry in Coyote. The spur track that was laid to the Coyote Graval Plant covered 15 acres (6.1 ha).

=== Closure and relocation of the station ===
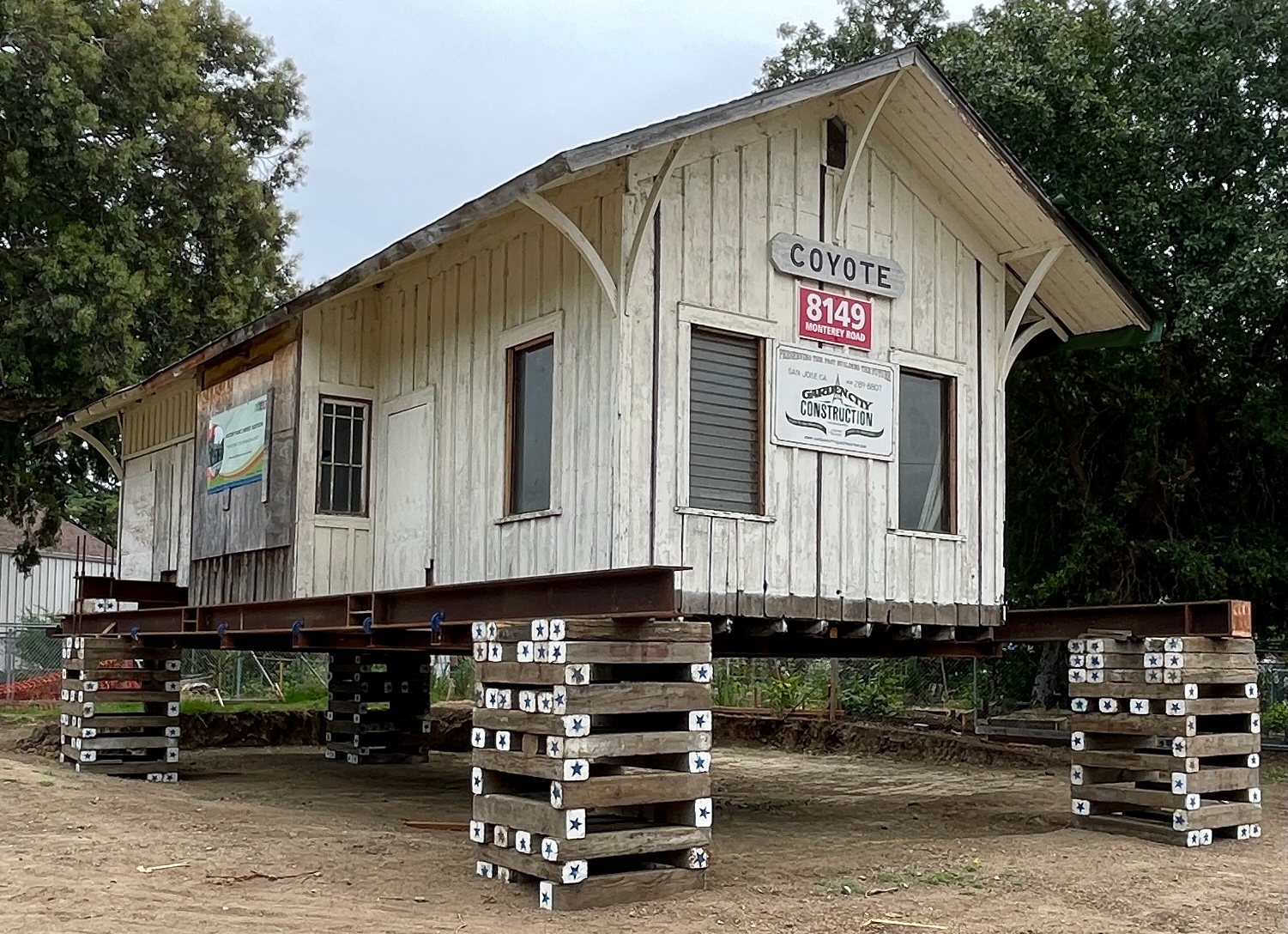
Coyote depot after the 2024 move to History Park.

The Coyote station's use decreased due to the advancements in technology and development of U.S. Route 101. In addition, the advent of radio and telephone communications reduced the need for station agents to manually relay orders to passing trains. These changes led to a decline in passenger use and the need for the station stop. After serving as a request stop for several years, the station closed in 1959. A new freeway bypassed Coyote in 1984, about 0.6 miles (0.97 km) east of the town, causing the town to nearly disappear.

For the next fifty years, the depot was leased as a private residence. In 2010, the last tenant left, leaving the building abandoned. Plans emerged to demolish the depot due to the proposed construction of the high-speed rail line in the area. In 2017, a grassroots campaign was started to save the Coyote depot from being demolished. After two years of negotiations, Union Pacific Railroad agreed to sell the depot to History San José for a nominal fee of $1. The Coyote depot was relocated to History Park at Kelley Park in San José on May 18, 2024. The Coyote depot will be restored to its 19th-century architectural features and made into a transportation museum. A new room within the depot will have a model train display managed by the "Golden State Toy Train Operators."

== See also ==
- List of railway stations
- California State Railroad Museum
- History of rail transportation in California
