= Burnett Township, Santa Clara County, California =

Former township in Santa Clara County, California

Burnett Township
- Township
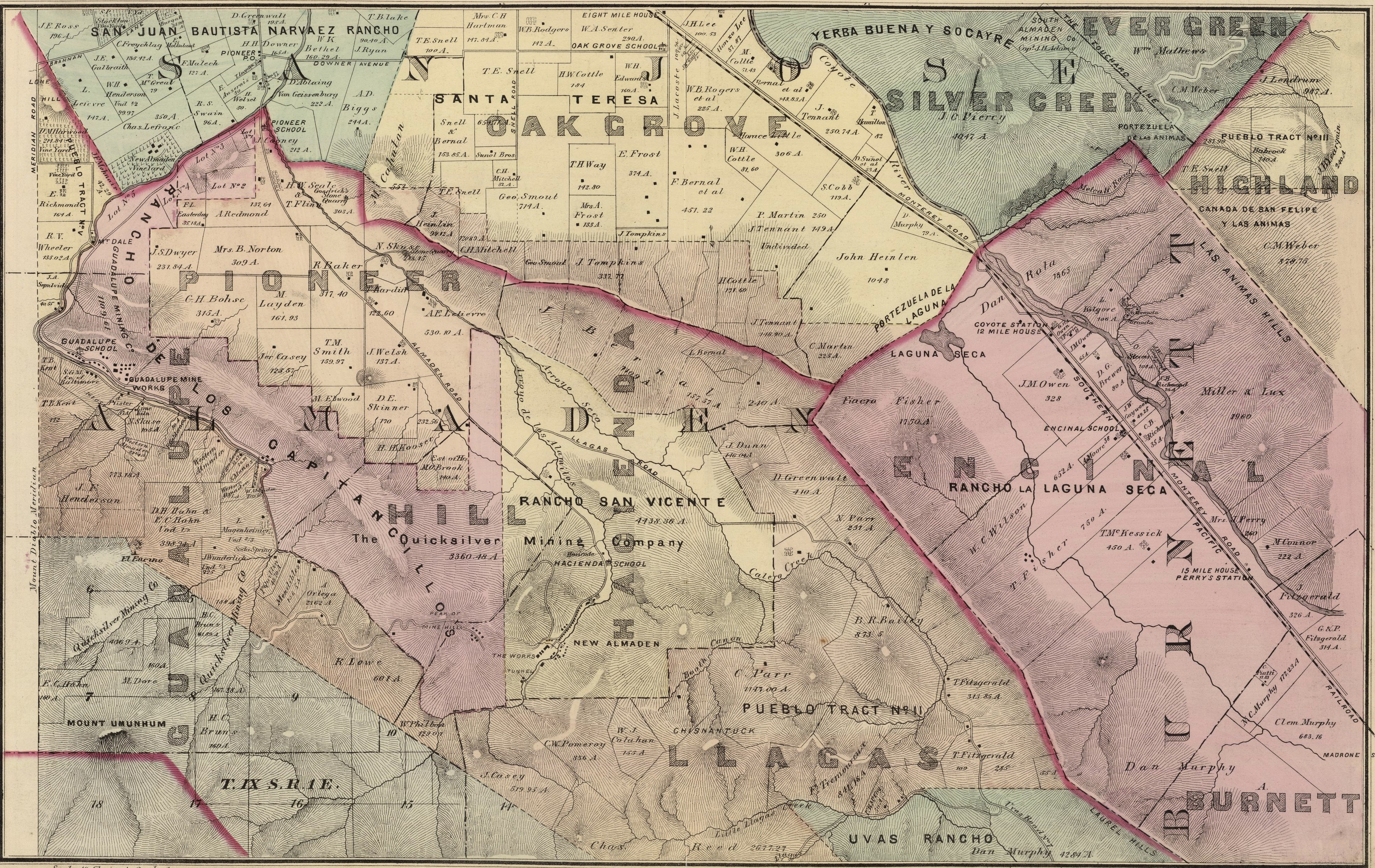
- Santa Clara Map showing Burnett Township

- Location in California
- Coordinates: 37°10′00″N 121°41′32″W
- Country: United States
- State: California
- County: Santa Clara
- Settled: 1844; 182 years ago
- Organized: 1852
- Elevation: 312 ft (95 m)

Population
  - Total: 802
- Time zone: UTC-8 (Pacific (PST))
  - Summer (DST): UTC-7 (PDT)

Historical population
Census	Pop.	Note	%±
1860	220		—
1870	802		264.5%
1880	540		−32.7%

The Burnett Township is a former township of Santa Clara County, California, United States, in the San Francisco Bay Area region, which includes the present day cities of Santa Teresa, Coyote, Madrone, and Morgan Hill. The township was named after the California Governor Peter Hardeman Burnett (1807–1895). Primarily a farm community, the township was settled in 1844, from a group of Mexican land grants that were added to Santa Clara County when the county was established in 1834.

== History ==
The original inhabitants in the area included the Ohlone people, residing near Coyote Creek and Santa Clara, California. Gilroy had its own township, bordered to the north by the New Almaden and Burnett townships. On July 22, 1834, Juan Álvarez was granted by Governor José Figueroa, the 19,973-acre (80.83 km^{2}) Mexican land grant Rancho Refugio de la Laguna Seca. The grant extended southward along Coyote Creek from Rancho Santa Teresa and Coyote to Rancho Ojo del Agua de la Coche and Morgan Hill.

In 1844, the area was settled by the first non-indigenous arrivals, Martin Murphy Sr. (1785–1865) and his wife and children. In 1845, Captain William Fisher (1810–1850) of Boston, arrived in the township and purchased the 19,973-acre (80.83 km^{2}) Mexican land grant Rancho Laguna Seca from Juan Álvarez. The first building constructed in the Burnett township was the Twelve-Mile House built by Fisher around 1852. Fisher's son, Thomas Fisher came to the area in 1846. Daniel Martin Murphy established the first orchard at his farm. Captain Fisher cultivated the first vineyard. By 1850, the population had grown to 540. Burnett Township was organized in 1852 and named after California's first Governor, Peter Hardeman Burnett (1807–1895). The township included the election precincts of Burnett and Highland and the school districts of Burnett and Coyote. The U.S. government opened the Burnett Post Office on April 30, 1862, named after the Burnett township. It was located inside the Twelve-Mile House.

The 1876 Thompson & West map of Santa Clara County shows the Burnett township, and the railroad stops at Tennant, Coyote, Perry, and Madrone. It also shows several schools and ranchos. The route between downtown San José and Gilroy featured several stagecoach stops that ran through Burnett Township. The names of the stops indicated their distance from San José. Theses stops provided opportunities to change horses and allowed passengers to have meals or look for overnight accommodations.

== Geography ==
Burnett Township was in the eastern portion of Santa Clara County, California, and occupied a major portion of Santa Clara Valley. The Coyote Creek and Calaveras Creek flow through the township.

== Topography ==
Burnett Township consisted of a large level plain at the bottom of the valley and a mountain range to the east and west. The highest point is Loma de Tora, also known as Murphy's Peak, now known as El Toro (Spanish for "The Bull"), due west of Burnett station near Morgan Hill. It is at an elevation of 1,427 ft (435 m).

== Climate ==
Due to the moderating influence of the Pacific Ocean, Burnett Township enjoyed a mild, Mediterranean climate. The summer months were typically dry. Winter months had sunny and partly cloudy days, with breaks between rainstorms. The local climate supported chaparral with stands of live oak at higher elevations.

== See also ==
- Township (United States)
- Coyote Grange
- Fisher Creek
