= History Park =

Museum in San Jose, California, United States

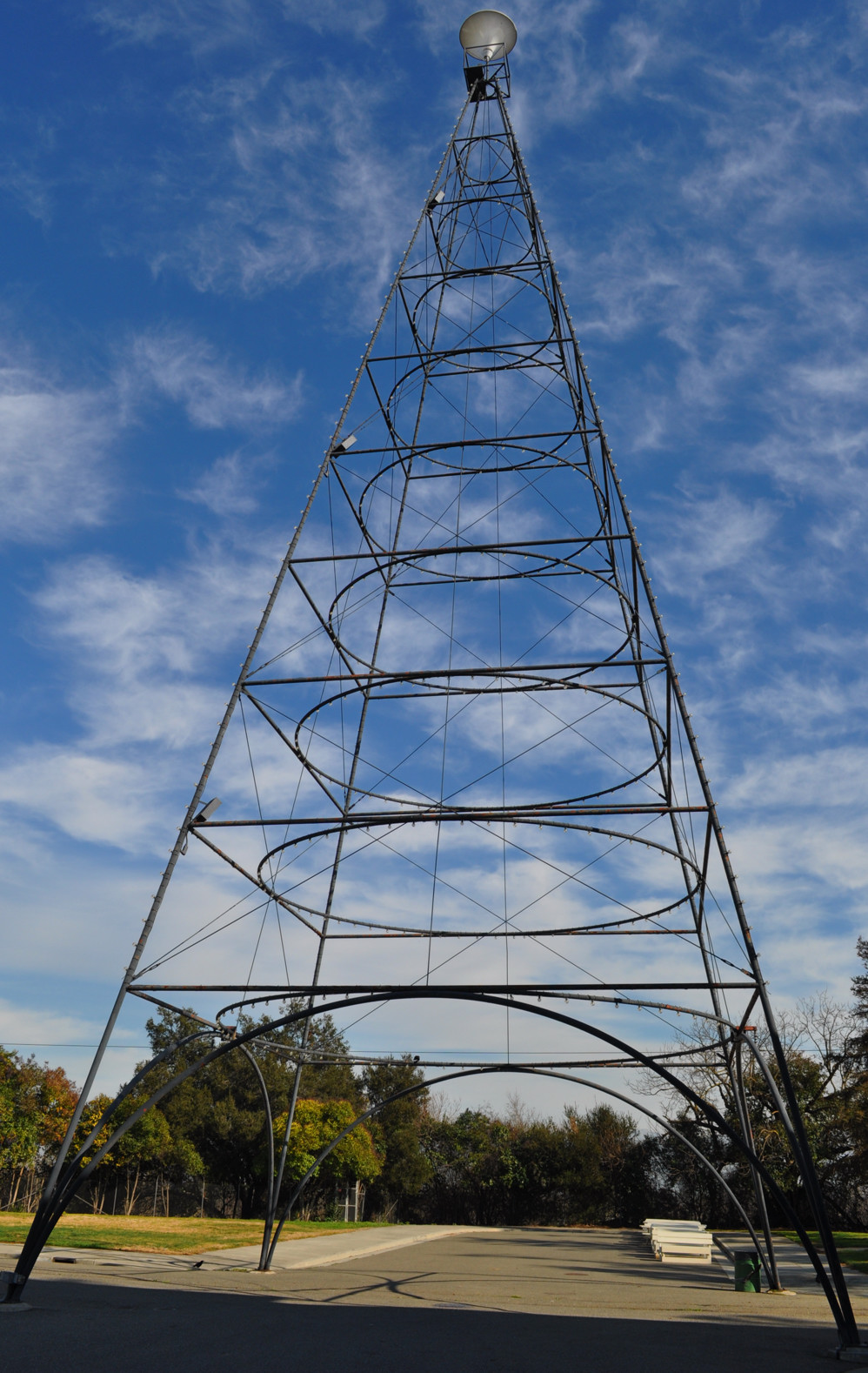
- San Jose Light Tower half-height replica.
- Interactive map of History Park
- Type: Historical recreation of early 20th century California
- Location: 635 Senter Road; Kelley Park
- Nearest city: San Jose, California, US
- Coordinates: 37°19′14″N 121°51′28″W
- Area: 14 acres (5.7 ha)
- Created: 1971
- Operator: History San José
- Public transit: VTA Line 73 at Senter Rd. & Phelan Ave.

History Park at Kelley Park in San Jose, California, United States, is designed as an indoor/outdoor museum, arranged to appear as a small US town might have in the early 1900s (decade). Since its inauguration in 1971, 32 historic buildings and other landmarks have either been moved from their original locations or are represented by replicas.

== Management ==
History San José (HSJ) is the 501(c)(3) nonprofit organization that was formed from the San José Historical Museum. The San José Historical Museum was spun off as the History San José nonprofit in 1998.

History Park at Kelley Park is operated by History San José, which also has its headquarters at History Park. HSJ manages History Park at Kelley Park from the upper floor of the Pacific Hotel in History Park, a replica of a historic hotel originally in downtown San Jose. HSJ is also responsible for the operation of the Peralta Adobe—Fallon House Historic Site and the Collection Center/Research Library & Archives, which are in downtown San Jose and Kelley Park, respectively.

== History ==
In 1945, volunteer Clyde Arbuckle was appointed to the honorary position of San José City Historian; Arbuckle had no formal training, but was well known for his keen interest in local history. In 1949, a temporary replica of the first State House was built in San Jose Civic Plaza to celebrate the centennial of the first Legislature of California. Arbuckle curated a well-received exhibit of local history shown with the State House replica. The replica was moved to the Santa Clara County Fairgrounds in 1950 and became the State House Museum, where Arbuckle served as the first curator, collecting local historic artifacts. So much material was donated that an annex, built in 1958 to house additional items, was full by 1962.

The Historical Museum of San José, managed by the city of San Jose, was founded in 1949 simultaneously with the State House centennial activities. In 1965, Theron Fox persuaded the city of San Jose to set aside 16 acres (6.5 ha) at the south end of Kelley Park to house the San José Historical Museum, intended to be a historical reconstruction of a small town, which opened on June 18, 1971. The San Jose Historical Museum Association was also founded in 1971 to administer Historical Museum activities. The architectural firm of Churchill & Zlatunich were retained to develop a master plan for the site by July 1, 1972. By February 1972, the museum was averaging over 1,000 visitors per month.

On February 24, 1977, the half-scale replica of the Electric Light Tower was placed upright, and later that year, on September 25, the first major buildings were dedicated on the site, including the replica Pacific Hotel and historic Umbarger House. By 1980, the Historical Museum had brought onsite the Associated Oil Company Gas Station, Chiechi House, Coyote Post Office, Dashaway Stables, Doctor's Office, Empire Fire House, Print Shop, and Steven's Ranch Fruit Barn.

An agreement was reached in 2024 to include a house from an area farmed by Japanese American families for nearly 120 years. A home that once belonged to Eiichi Sakauye is the only building being saved as a new development clears the land of rows of crops, planters, historic barns, buildings and pump houses.

== Exhibits ==
Period exhibits consist mainly of the 32 historical buildings and replica buildings, including a doctor's office, a dentist's office (complete with an old foot-pedal-powered drill), blacksmith shed, a working print shop, the Pacific Hotel, the Empire Fire House, the Bank of Italy, a post office, and a number of houses of early Santa Clara Valley settlers. Some buildings house special interest historical societies and others host galleries. Admission is free, unless there is a special event being held.

On weekdays, tours are offered by paid staff, often for local students on class field trips. On weekends, selected exhibit buildings are staffed on a rotating schedule by volunteers, who also operate a vintage trolley over the length of the park, including under the Light Tower replica.

=== Buildings ===
Historical Buildings and Replicas at History Park
Name	Image	Partner	Original location	Notes	Ref.
Associated Oil Service Station		—	Market & Julian; San Jose	Gas station built in 1927 for Associated Oil Company and saved from demolition for Guadalupe Freeway expansion by moving to History Park in July/Aug 1978. Dedicated Sept 9, 1979.	
Bank of Italy		—	(replica)	Replica of the San Jose branch of the Bank of Italy, the first branch built outside San Francisco. Bank of Italy was founded by A.P. Giannini, precursor to the Bank of America.	
Blacksmith Shed		—			
Chiechi House		—	820 Northrup Ave; San Jose	Built originally around 1880; moved to History Park in 1973.	
Coyote Post Office		—	Coyote, California in unincorporated Santa Clara County, on Monterey Rd between San Jose and Morgan Hill	Built in 1862; postal service moved out of building in 1973. Building moved to History Park in 1974 and dedicated on Apr 5, 1981.	
Coyote station		—	Monterey Road, Coyote, California	Built in 1869 for Southern Pacific Railroad; station closed its doors in 1959. Building moved to History Park in May 2024.	
Dashaway Stables		—	130 S 2nd St; San Jose	Replica of stables built in 1888 and destroyed in 1928; replica dedicated in 1975. Livery stable is the US term for a business that rented out horse-drawn carriages.	
Dr. Warburton's Office		—	corner of Main and Benton Sts, Santa Clara, California	Originally built in 1870s for Henry Hulme Warburton; first building to be relocated to History Park, 1966.	
Empire Firehouse		—	76 South Second St; San Jose	Replica of original firehouse built 1869 and destroyed by fire in 1892, dedicated in 1984.	
Gordon House		Rotary Club of San Jose	5303 McKee Rd; San Jose	House built before 1887; moved to History Park in 1986 and currently houses the administrative offices of the Rotary Club of San Jose.	
Greenawalt House		Museum of the Boat People & the Republic of Vietnam	Almaden near US 85; San Jose	Built in 1877 and moved to History Park in 1991.	
Hill House		—	1350 Sherman St; San Jose	Built in 1898; moved to History Park in 1997.	
Markham House		Poetry Center San Jose	432 S Eighth St; San Jose	Built in the 1860s, moved to History Park in 1987. Used as the San Jose Center for Poetry and Literature prior to the move; Poetry Center San Jose returned in 2002.	
Migrant Worker Houses		—	North First St; San Jose	Originally built c.1905–20 for Pratt-Low Preserving Company in Santa Clara and moved to San Jose in 1952; donated to History Park in the 1980s.	
Nelson – De Luz House		—	S 11th & William; San Jose	Built 1905; donated to History Park in 1986. Destroyed in a fire in 2023.	
Ng Shing Gung		Chinese Historical & Cultural Project	Taylor & Cleveland; San Jose	Replica of "Temple of Five Gods" building, a former Chinatown (Heinlenville) religious and community center, built in 1888 and demolished in 1949. Ng Shing Gung currently hosts the Chinese American Historical Museum (CAHM) and features exhibits documenting the historical timeline of Chinese immigration in the Santa Clara Valley, and includes artefacts recovered from the Market St. Chinatown which was destroyed by arson in 1887. The museum also includes artefacts recovered from the Woolen Mills Chinatown and exhibits of personal items and photographs from families of the original residents of Heinlenville. The second floor of the Ng Shing Gung temple houses the hand carved gilded golden altar built in Canton China in 1892.	
Pacific Hotel		—	74–80 S Market St; San Jose	Replica of original hotel built in 1880; dedicated in 1977 and serves as Historical Museum headquarters. Main floor has a candy and ice cream shop and an exhibit gallery.	
Pasetta House		—		Houses the Leonard and David McKay Gallery.	
Paulson House		California Pioneers of Santa Clara County	Downtown San Jose	Built in the 1890s and moved to History Park in 1986, displaced by Children's Discovery Museum of San Jose. Queen Anne-style residence with local history exhibits from the California Pioneers of Santa Clara County.	
Portuguese Historical Museum at the Imperio		Portuguese Heritage Society of California	E Santa Clara St & US 101; San Jose	Replica of the first permanent imperio built in San Jose (1915), dedicated 1997.	
Print Shop		Printers' Guild	91 N San Pedro St; San Jose	Residence, built in 1884; moved to History Park in 1972 and remodeled into a print shop.	
Santa Ana One-Room Schoolhouse		Connie L. Lurie College of Education Alumni Association of San Jose State University	Hollister	Opened at History Park in 1998. A one-room schoolhouse, originally built in 1871 in Hollister, in the Santa Ana Valley in San Benito County. Santa Ana School was used as schoolhouse for grades one through eight from 1872 to 1967. SJSU College of Education Alumni Board raised funds to move the schoolhouse to History Park and renovate it.	
Stevens Ranch Fruit Barn			2 miles (3.2 km) south of Coyote	Fruit barn (packing shed) built c.1890 and moved to History Park in 1979, displaced by US 101 expansion. The fruit barn not only has many farm implements and devices from the period, but also displays hundreds of photographs documenting the area's development. It also includes a collection of fruit picker wooden "box ends" from the families and companies of fruit growers from the Valley's history.	
Trolley Barn		California Trolley and Railroad Corporation	(replica)	Replica built in 1984. Houses and operates restored antique trolleys, both horse-drawn and electric, and automobiles, both gasoline and battery powered, along with other antique trolleys and cars awaiting restoration.	
Umbarger House		—	2662 S First; San Jose	Built in 1870s; moved to History Park in August 1970.	
Zanker House		African American Heritage House	Zanker Road; Alviso	Built in 1868; moved to History Park in 1987. Later additions removed during restoration.	

=== Other structures ===
- A half scale replica of the San Jose Electric Light Tower that used to tower 237 feet (72 m) over downtown San Jose at Santa Clara and Market.
- A bandstand

=== Exhibits ===
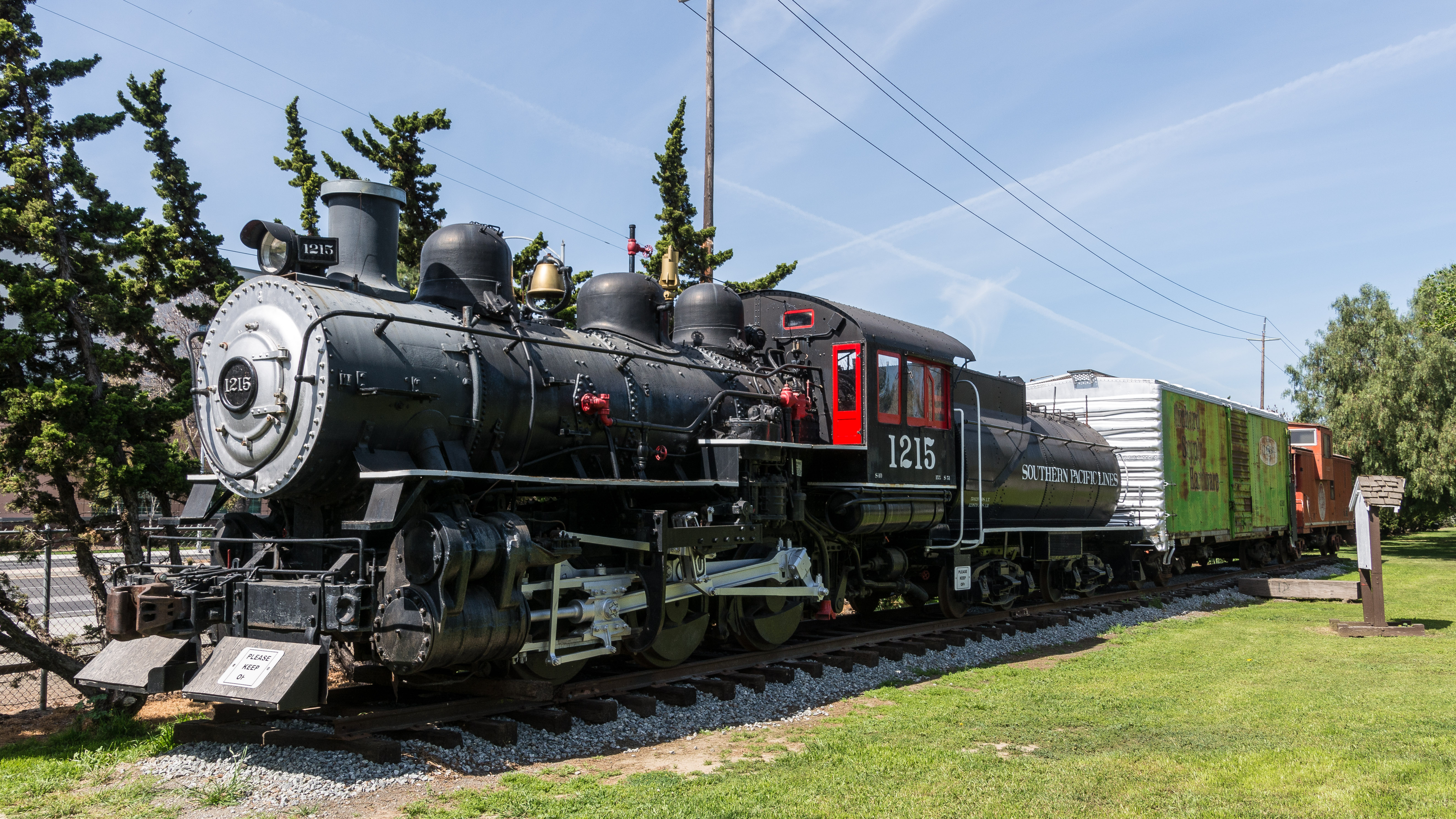
SP 1215 at History Park

Other attractions include:

- The Leonard and David McKay Gallery, opened on March 13, 2005, displays a collection of paintings of people, buildings, and landscapes from in and around the Santa Clara Valley.
- The Perham Collection of Early Electronics, previously at Foothills Electronics Museum. The Collection is housed at History San Jose's Collection Center and is not currently on display.
- Steam locomotive Southern Pacific 1215 and tender, Orchard Supply Hardware boxcar, Southern Pacific caboose, and Missouri Pacific caboose, in a static display.

=== Map ===
Historical and replica structures at History Park at Kelley Park
- Former commercial
- Former residences
- Former public
1 Associated Oil Service Station
2 Bank of Italy
3 Blacksmith Shed
4 Chiechi House
5 Coyote Post Office
6 Dashaway Stables
7 Dr Warburton's Office
8 Empire Firehouse
9 Gordon House (Rotary Club of San Jose)
10 Greenawalt House (Viet Museum)
11 Hill House
12 Markham House (Poetry Center San Jose)
13 Migrant Worker Houses
14 Nelson–De Luz House
15 Ng Shing Gung (Chinese American Historical Museum)
16 Pacific Hotel (History San Jose)
17 Pasetta House
18 Paulson House (California Pioneers of Santa Clara County)
19 Portuguese Historical Museum at the Imperio
20 Print Shop
21 San Jose electric light tower
22 Santa Ana One Room Schoolhouse
23 Southern Pacific 1215
24 Stevens Ranch Fruit Barn
25 Trolley Barn (California Trolley and Railroad Corporation)
26 Umbarger House
27 Zanker House (African American Heritage House)
