= Henry Hulme Warburton =

English-born American physician (1819–1903)

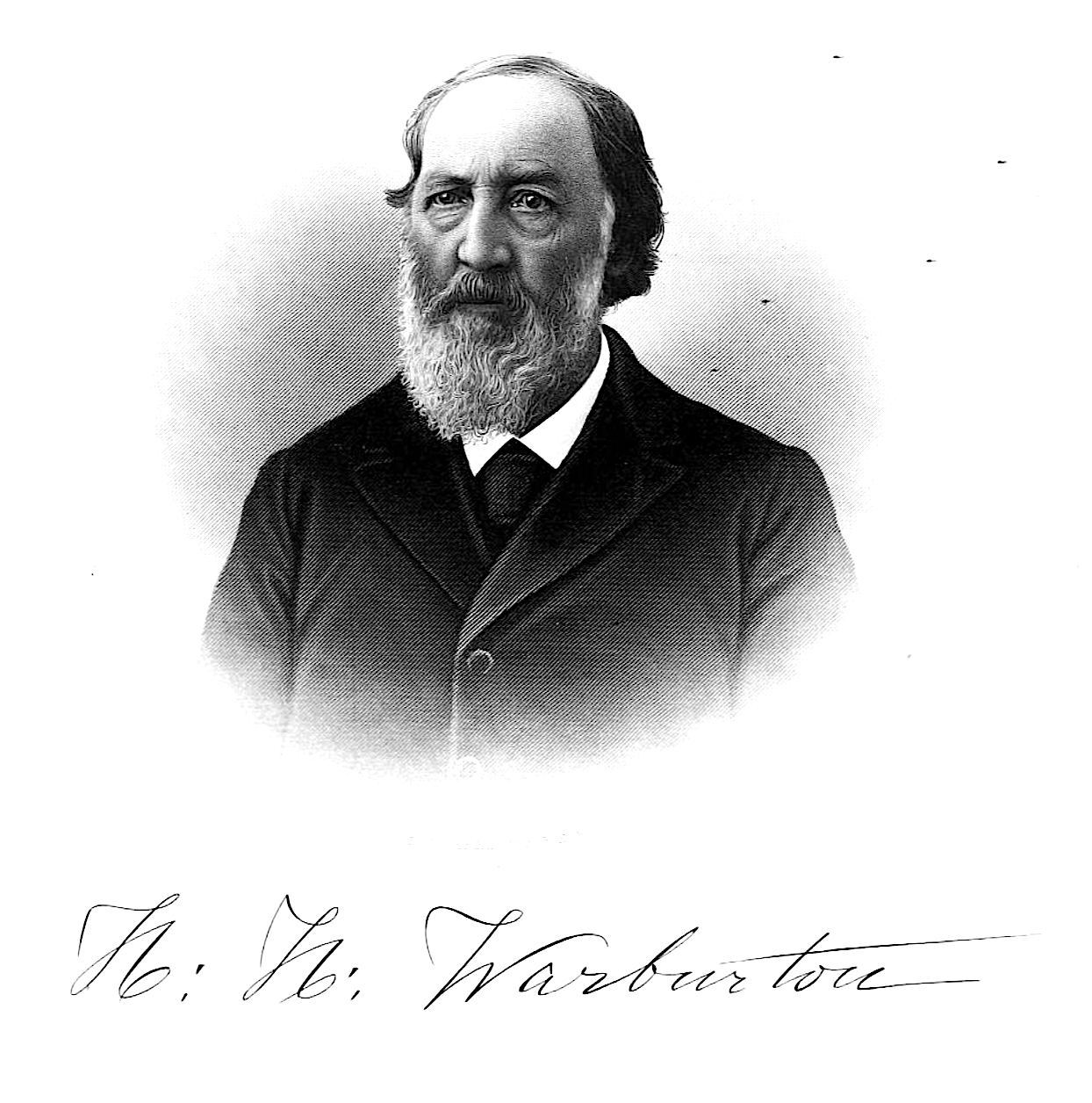
- Born: May 23, 1819; Betley, Staffordshire, England, United Kingdom of Great Britain and Ireland (now United Kingdom)
- Died: February 9, 1903 (aged 83); Santa Clara, California, U.S.
- Resting place: Mission City Memorial Park, Santa Clara, California, U.S.
- Other name: H.H. Warburton
- Education: Giggleswick School, London Hospital Medical College
- Occupations: Physician, surgeon, settler in California
- Spouse: Catharine Pennell Long (m. 1855–1903; his death)
- Children: 7

Henry Hulme Warburton (1819–1903) was an English-born American physician, surgeon, and early settler in Santa Clara, California. He was the first doctor in the area, his former medical office was built in 1870 in Santa Clara, California; and it was first building to be relocated to History Park in 1966.

== Early life and education ==
Henry Hulme Warburton was born on May 23, 1819, in Betley, Staffordshire, England, United Kingdom of Great Britain and Ireland (now United Kingdom). His father John Warburton was a physician, as well as three of his brothers. He came from a long line of physicians in England, which including his grandfather and great-grandfather.

Warburton attended Giggleswick School in North Yorkshire, England; and the London Hospital Medical College. After graduation, Warburton studied medicine under his father for the next 7 years.

== Career ==
Warburton left England in 1844, and arrived in New York City in July 1845. Starting in the autumn of 1845, he left dock in New London, Connecticut and worked as a surgeon aboard the Corea whaling ship under Captain Benjamin Hempstead, which took him to New Zealand and the Sandwich Islands (now Hawaii, United States). The Corea whaling ship docked in 1847 in San Francisco, which was then part of the Department of the Californias, Republic of Mexico (now California, United States). He briefly tried gold mining at the start of the California gold rush.

In 1848, he moved and was the first physician in Santa Clara, California, a town founded near the Spanish Mission Santa Clara de Asís. There he established his medical office, and the first pharmacy in c. 1860. His former medical office was built in 1870, and was on the corner of Main Street and Benton Street in Santa Clara, California.

In 1855, Warburton married Catharine Pennell Long from Ohio, and together they had 7 children. Warburton was one of the original members in 1856 of the Odd Fellows Santa Clara Lodge (no. 52; now the Odd Fellows of San Jose “True Fellowship”). The Warburton family were members of the Methodist Episcopal Church.

== Death and legacy ==
He died on February 9, 1903, in Santa Clara, and was buried at Mission City Memorial Park in Santa Clara. When he died, he had been the longest practicing physician in California and on the Pacific coast, and he had been practicing 56 years.

The Warburton pharmacy building was destroyed in a fire in 1906.

In 1966, his medical office was the first building to be relocated to History Park in San Jose. The former site of Warburton’s medical office has a historical marker erected by the San Jose Historical Museum Association (and now houses the Park Central Apartment Complex).
