= Happy Hollow Park & Zoo =

Zoo and amusement park in San Jose, California, US

- Happy Hollow Park & Zoo logo

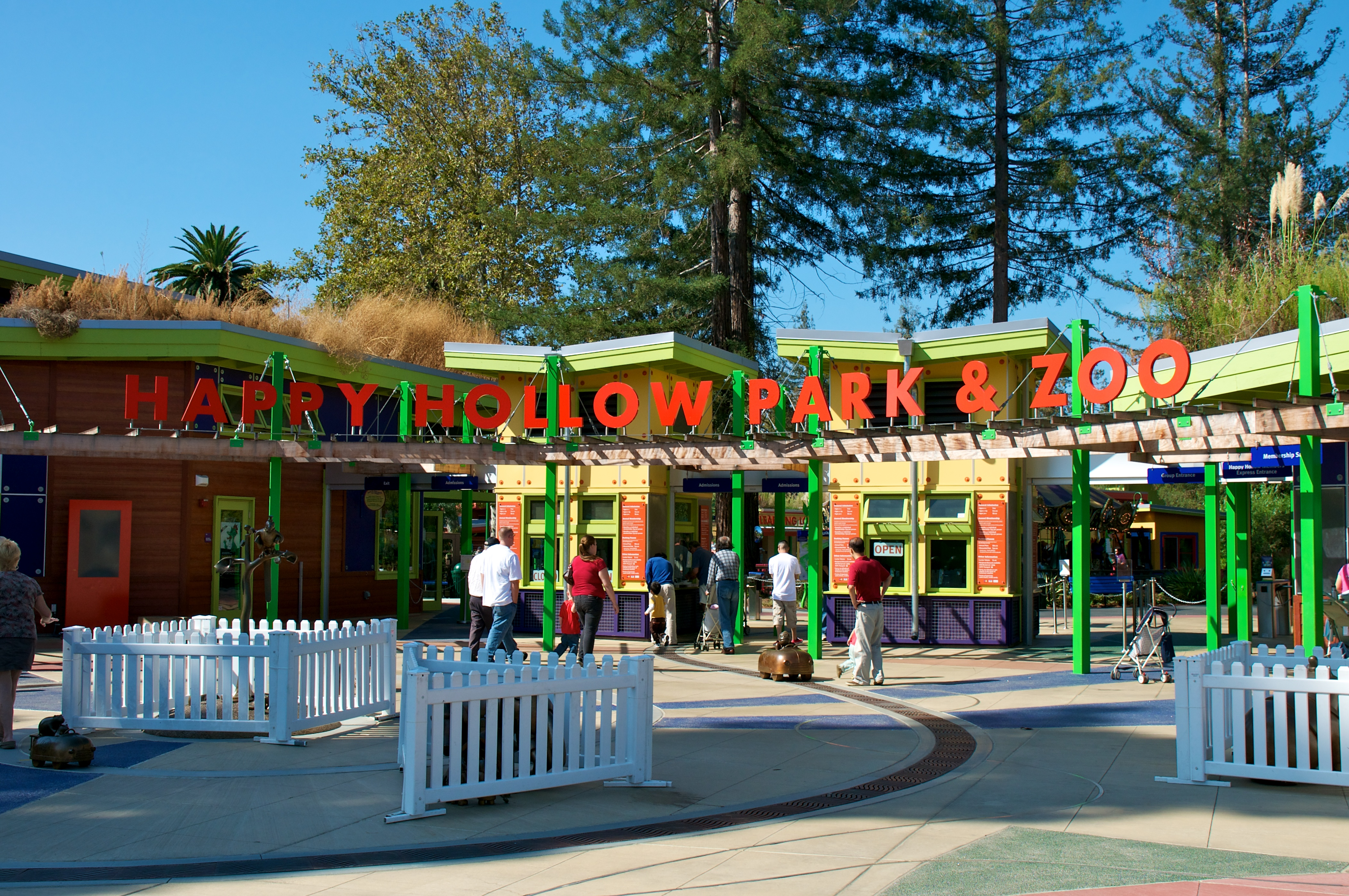
- The entrance to the zoo
- Interactive map of Happy Hollow Park & Zoo
- 37°19′32.45″N 121°51′43.4″W
- Location: 1300 Senter Rd San Jose, California, 95112
- Land area: 16 acres (6.5 ha)
- No. of animals: 150
- Annual visitors: 500,000+
- Memberships: AZA, IAAPA
- Website: happyhollow.org

Happy Hollow Park & Zoo is a 16-acre (6.5 ha) zoo and amusement park in San Jose, California, which originally opened in 1961. The facility was closed in 2008 for major renovations, and opened its gates again on March 20, 2010.

Happy Hollow Park & Zoo is an accredited member of the Association of Zoos and Aquariums (AZA) and a member of the International Association of Amusement Parks and Attractions (IAAPA).

== History ==
Jaycees members Alden Campen and Ernie Renzel started planning the park in 1956. They bought the original 7.5 acres (3.0 ha) at the north end of today's Kelley Park for $300,000 on the city's behalf.

== Features ==
- Puppet theater
- Animal hospital with indoor and outdoor quarantine, surgery and radiology
- Education center built out of hay bales with year-round classes for ages 12-months to adult
- Rides and structures for toddlers and children featuring maze, slides, swings, ropes and climbing areas
- Carousel and roller coaster

== Exhibits ==
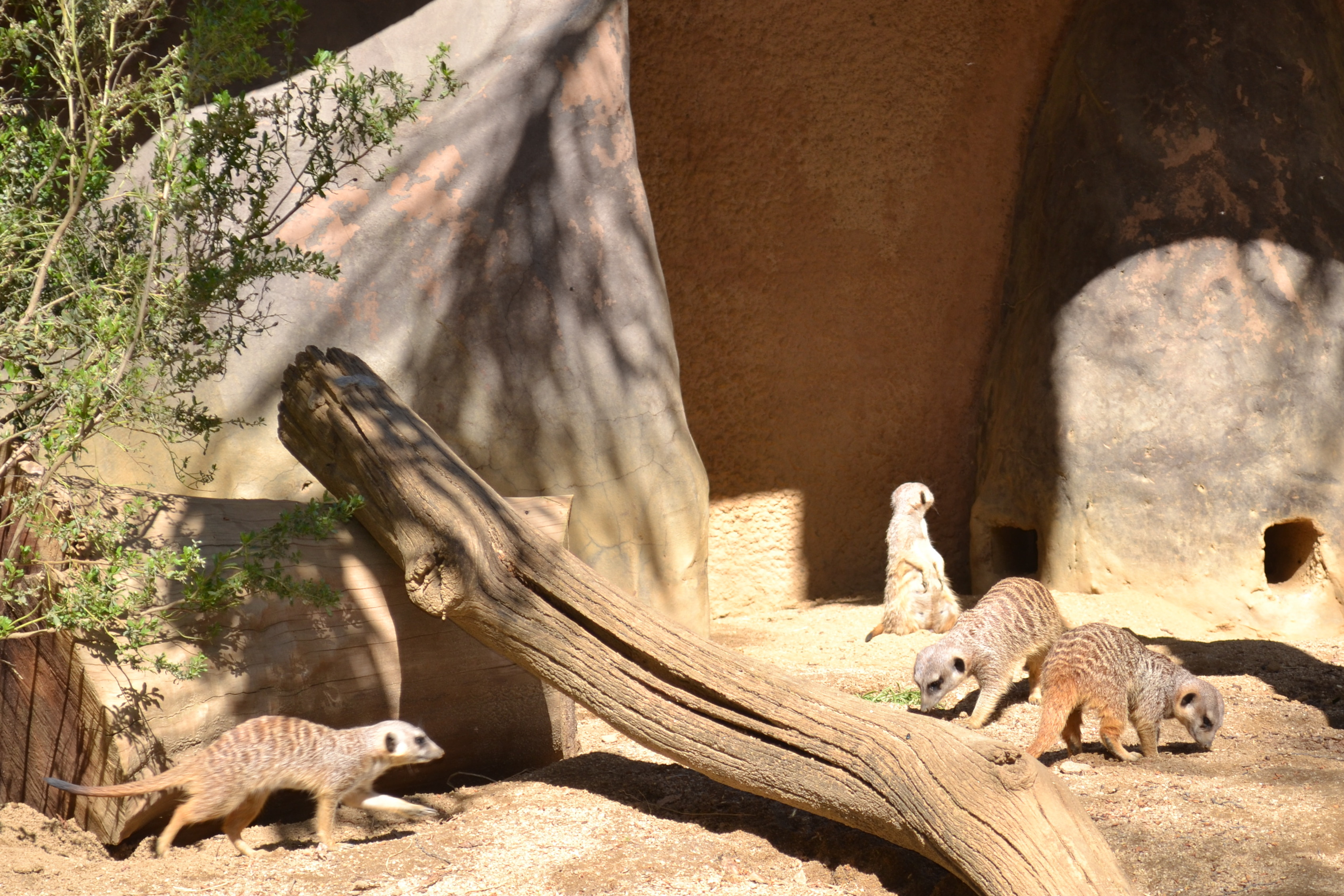
Meerkats at the zoo

Children can pet and feed – in addition to goats – also sheep and miniature cows.

- Petting zoo with an animal barn
- "Parallel play area" for children: next to endangered lemurs
- Fossa exhibit (a member of the mongoose family, most famous for its role in the movie Madagascar)
- The museum is open everyday from 10:00 a.m. to 5:00 p.m.

== Rides ==
=== Part of the Giggle Grove Area ===
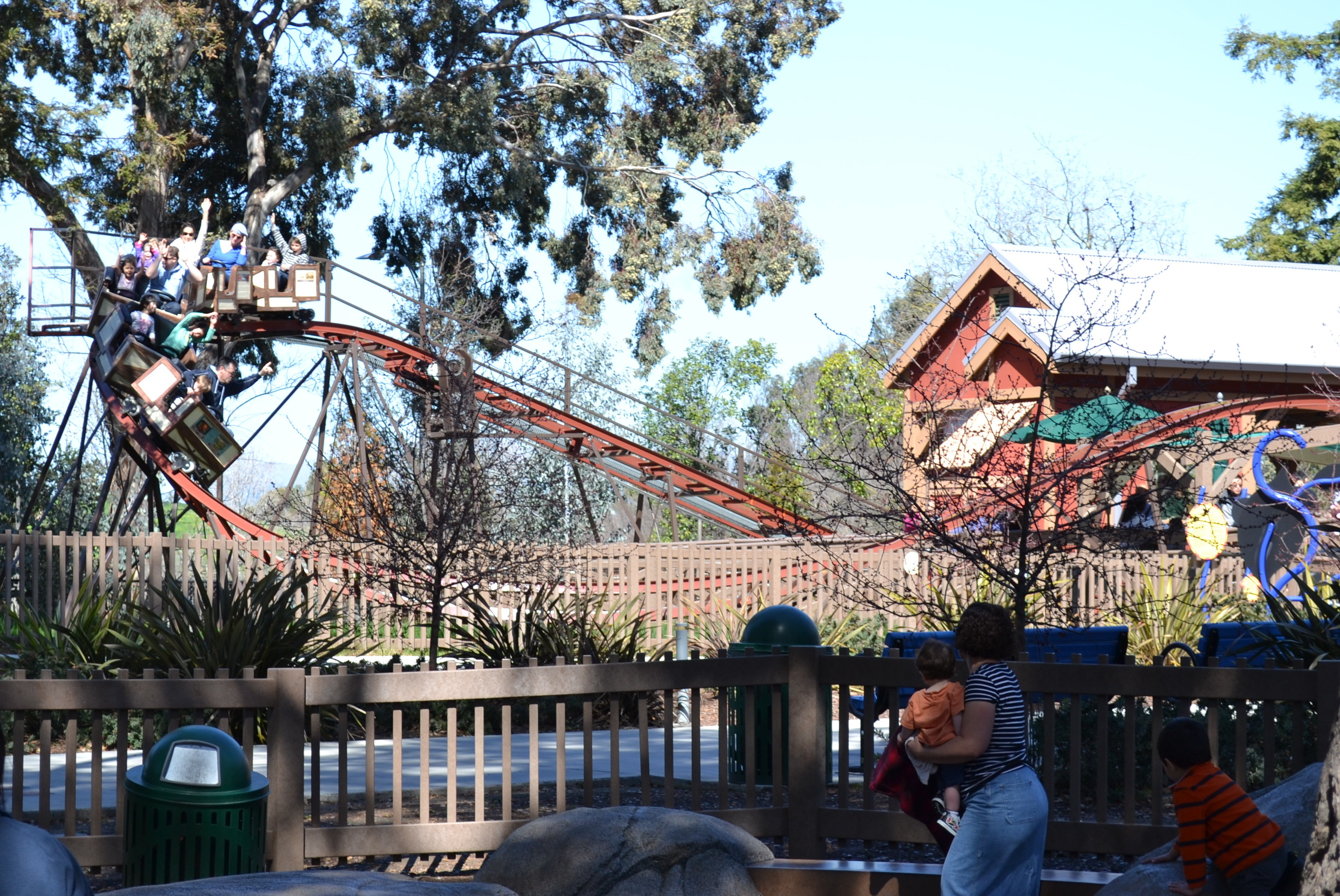
Roller coaster.

- Dragon Flyer
- Kiddie Swings
- Frog Hopper - a small drop tower
- The Granny Bugs
- The Mini Putts
- Team Kids Speedway - quadracycle racetrack for children

=== Other Rides ===
- Keep-Around-Carousel with "seats" in a form of wild animals
- Pacific Fruit Express Family Roller Coaster
- Danny the Dragon Ride - dragon-shaped guide-rail rubber-tyred train

== Animals ==
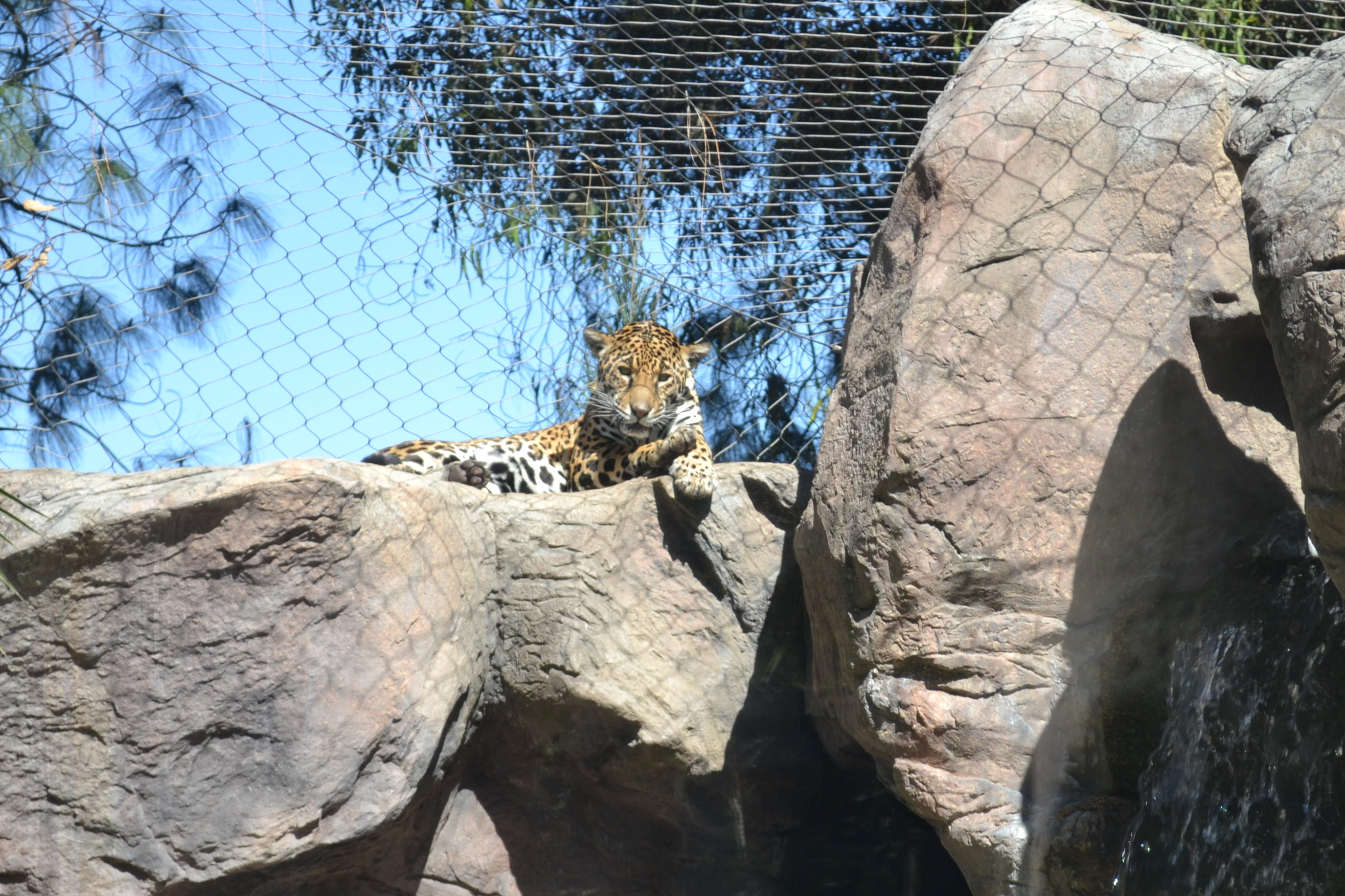
Jaguar at the zoo

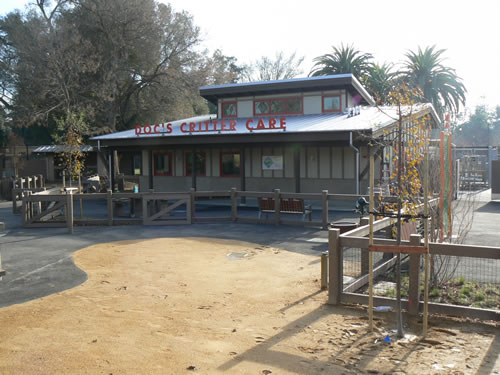
Doc's Critter Care is an animal hospital which features indoor and outdoor quarantine, surgery and radiology facilities.

- Jaguar
- Black and white ruffed lemurs
- Ring-tailed lemurs
- Red ruffed lemurs
- Meerkats
- American alligator
- Parma Wallabies
- Ibises
- Vultures
- Blue and yellow macaws and Scarlet macaw
- African spurred tortoise
- Chacoan peccary
- Capybaras
- Giant Anteater
- Red-sided eclectus parrot
- Honey bees
- Guinea pigs
- Goats
- Turkeys
- Red Pandas

== Other Amenities ==
- Cafeteria
- Gift Shop

== Gallery ==
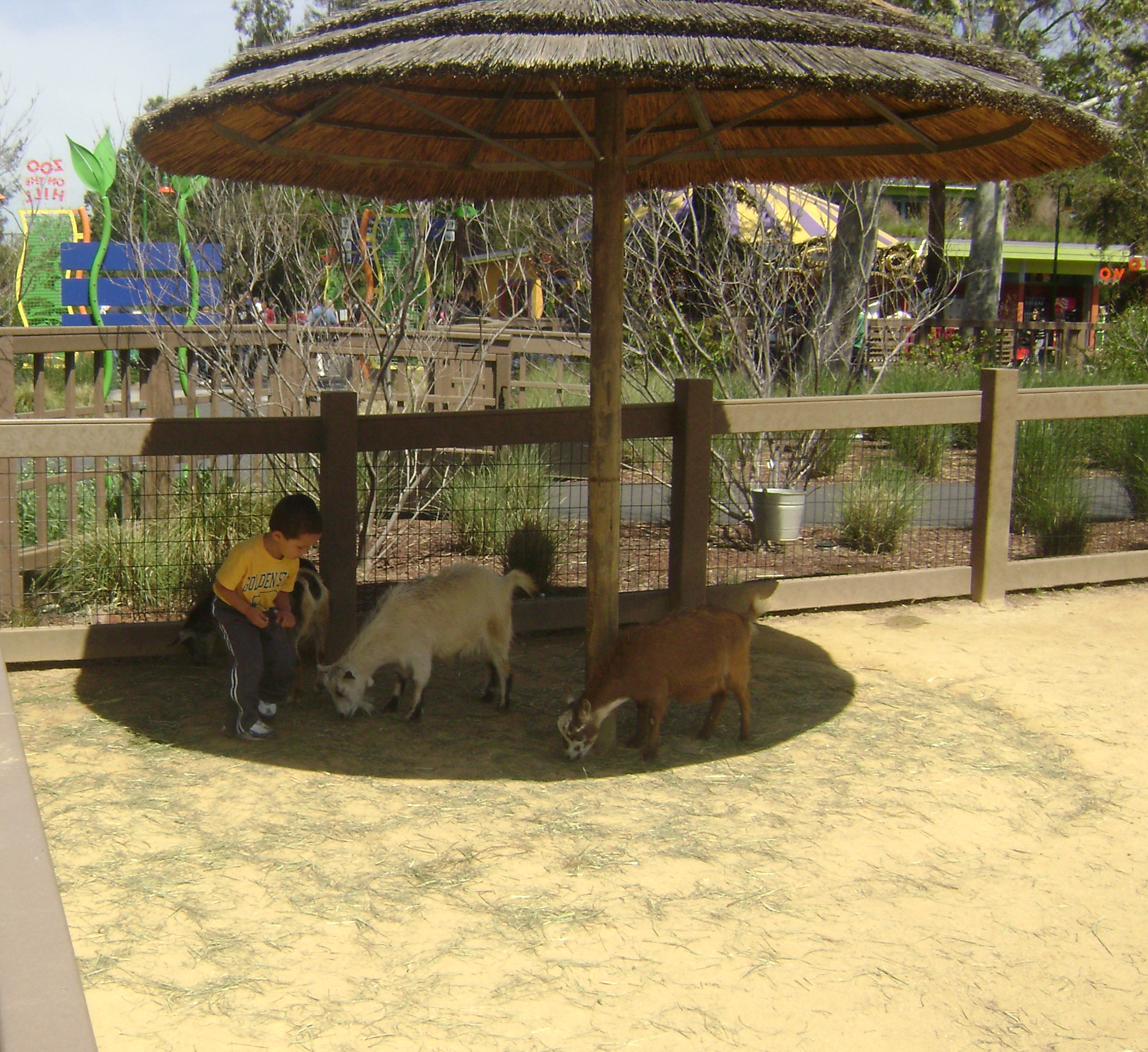
A corner of the animal petting area.

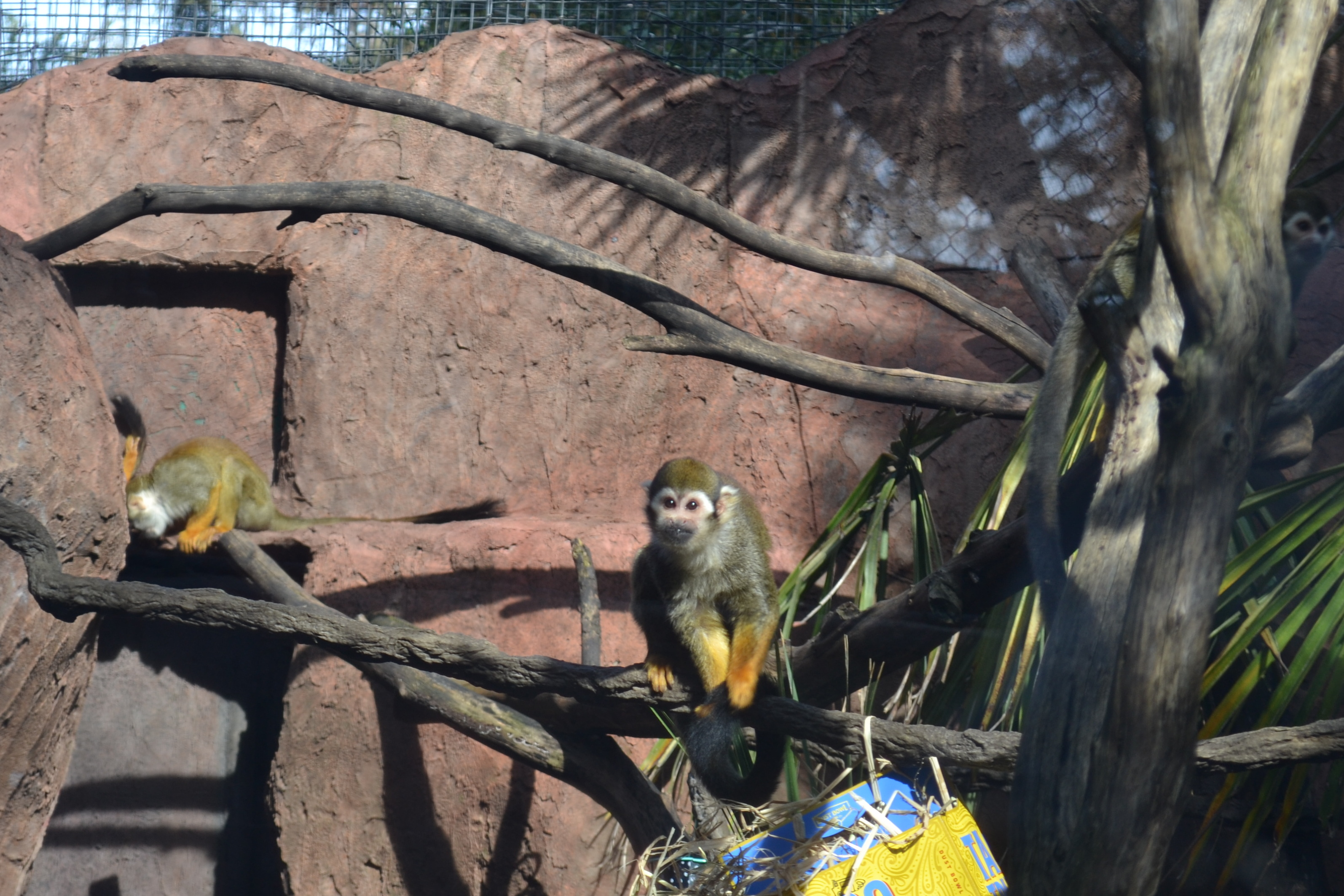
Monkeys at the zoo.

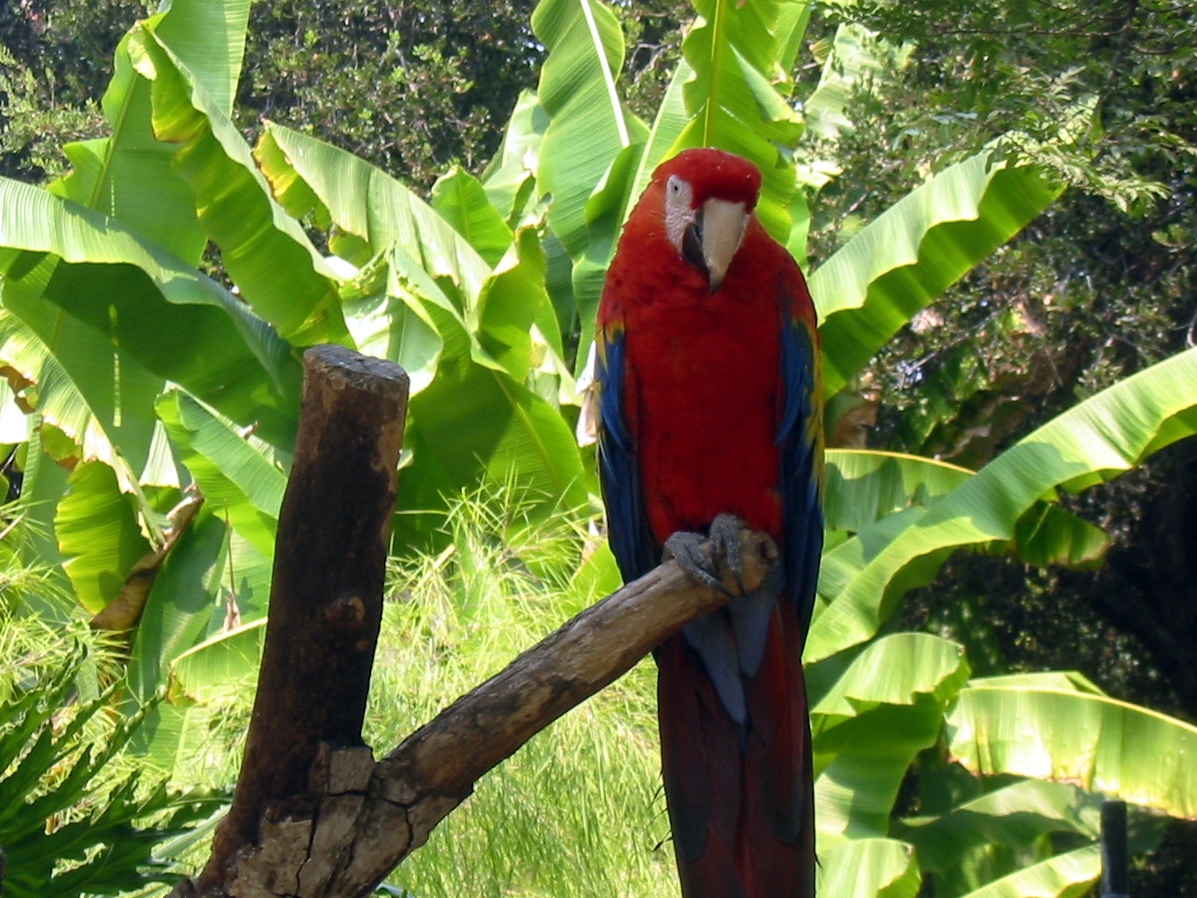
Scarlet macaw (Ara macao).

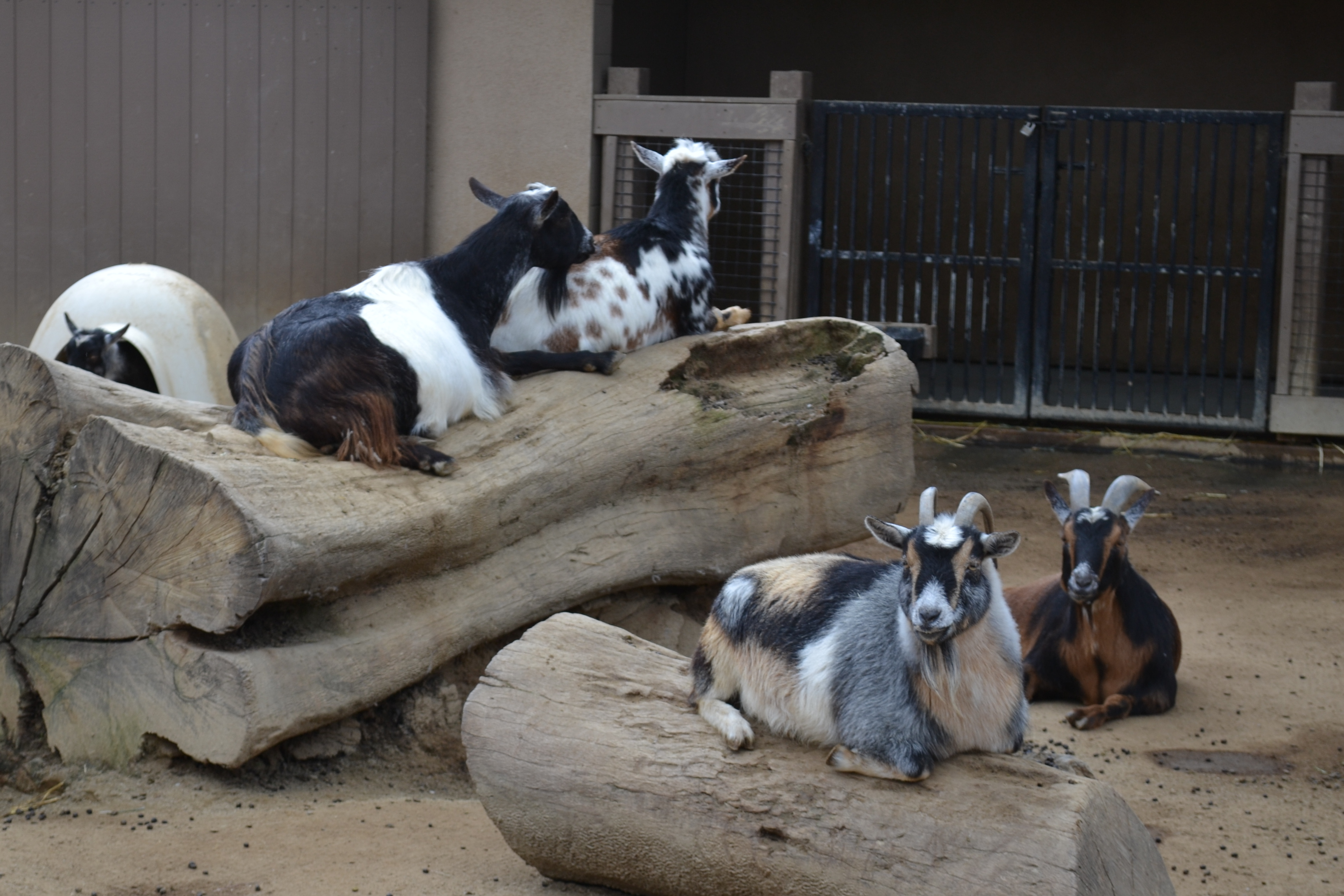
Goats.

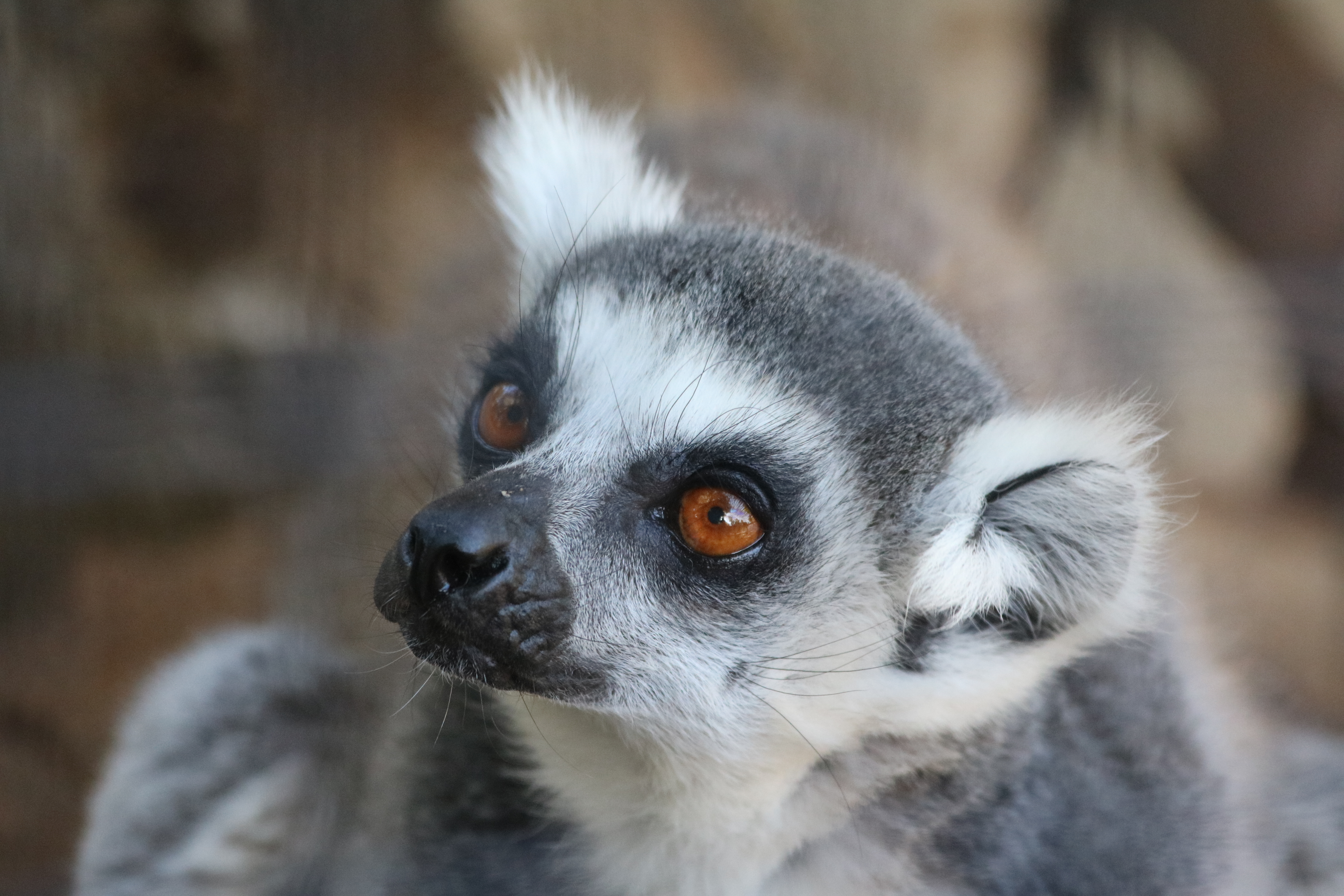
Lemur.
