= Clyde Arbuckle =

American historian (1903–1998)

Clyde Arbuckle (1903–1998) was an American historian of, and lifelong resident of, San Jose, California. He is the author of Clyde Arbuckle's History of San José. This 500 page book has been extensively referenced by historians.

== Early life ==
Arbuckle was the son of W. J. Arbuckle, and the brother of Roscoe "Fatty" Arbuckle, a silent film star. As a young man, Arbuckle played the banjo. Arbuckle was also a road bicycle racer with the Garden City Wheelmen, and a referee at the Burbank Velodrome. In 1922 he set a national cycling speed record.

== Career ==
Arbuckle was the founder and curator of the San José Historical Museum (now called History San Jose). He was secretary of the San Jose Historic Landmarks Commission.

Arbuckle was San Jose's official historian for more than fifty years. During this time he amassed a large collection of photographs of the area, which are now housed at the San Jose Public Library. The photographs have been used to illustrate many history books.

== Death and legacy ==
A biography of Arbuckle's life, Clyde Arbuckle: A 90 Year Biography, was written by Leonard McKay published by Memorobilia of San Jose in 1993. Arbuckle died in 1998. San Jose residents have named a public school in his memory.

== Publications ==
- Santa Clara County Ranchos, 1968
- Oil Boring in Santa Clara Valley, 1959
- Clyde Arbuckle's history of San Jose, 1985.
- History of San José: Transportation - Volume 5, 2004
- New Almaden Mercury Mines: A Long Perspective and History, 1965, with A. C. Innes and R. Burton Rose.
