= Kelley Park =

Park in California, United States of America

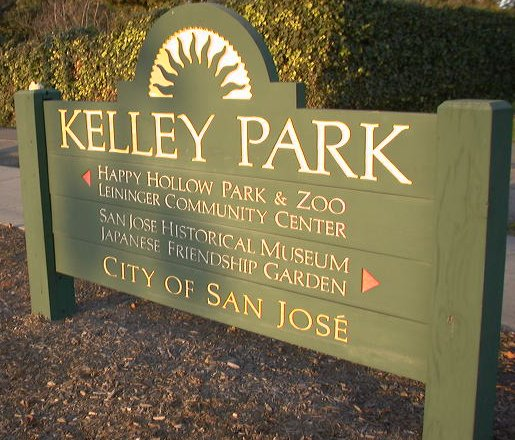
- Kelley Park welcome sign
- Interactive map of Kelley Park
- Location: 1300 Senter Road
- Nearest city: San Jose, California
- Coordinates: 37°19′26″N 121°51′43″W
- Public transit: VTA Route 73
- Website: Official website

Kelley Park is a 156-acre (63 ha) city park in San Jose, California, United States.

Selected locations in and near Kelley Park, San Jose
- Parks
- Points of Interest
- Schools
- Stadia
1 Happy Hollow Park & Zoo
2 Japanese Friendship Garden
3 History Park
4 Kelley Park Disc Golf Course
5 Spartan Stadium
6 Solar4America Ice (was Sharks Ice)
7 San Jose Municipal Stadium
8 Yerba Buena High School
9 Kelley House

== Location and facilities ==
Kelley Park is bounded by Story Road (on the northwest), Senter Road (on the southwest), Roberts Street (on the northeast), and Yerba Buena High School and Phelan Avenue (on the southeast) in East San Jose. Coyote Creek winds through much of the park, which is part of the larger Coyote Creek Park Chain in San Jose.

Kelley Park encompasses other facilities such as:

- Happy Hollow Park & Zoo
- Japanese Friendship Garden
- History Park at Kelley Park (a.k.a. History San Jose), which itself includes:
  - Portuguese Historical Museum
  - Viet Museum

The Leininger Center, just south of Happy Hollow, is the central location where citizens apply for city park permits and reservations. Most of the rest of the park is picnic areas, lawns, groves of trees, and plenty of pathways in between. There is also an 18-hole disc golf course in the walnut orchard behind History park

== History ==
The land was once a farm owned by Mrs. Louise Archer Kelley who inherited the land from her father Judge Lawrence Archer, a local pioneer and former mayor of San Jose. Kelley called the land "AR-KEL Villa" in honor of her father (ARcher) and her husband (Frank KELley). Pillars marked "AR-KEL" can still be seen on the pepper-tree drive off Senter.

=== Archer and Kelley family ===
In California, the Archers first settled in Sacramento, then briefly in San Francisco before arriving at San Jose in January 1853.

Judge Lawrence Archer was elected Mayor of San Jose in 1856. After one term, he was elected county judge in 1867, from which he resigned in 1871. He was elected mayor again in 1877. With his first wife, he had a daughter (also named Louise, born c. 1863) before his wife Louise died in 1869. He remarried in 1870, to the former Alice B. Bethell, and they had three more children together.

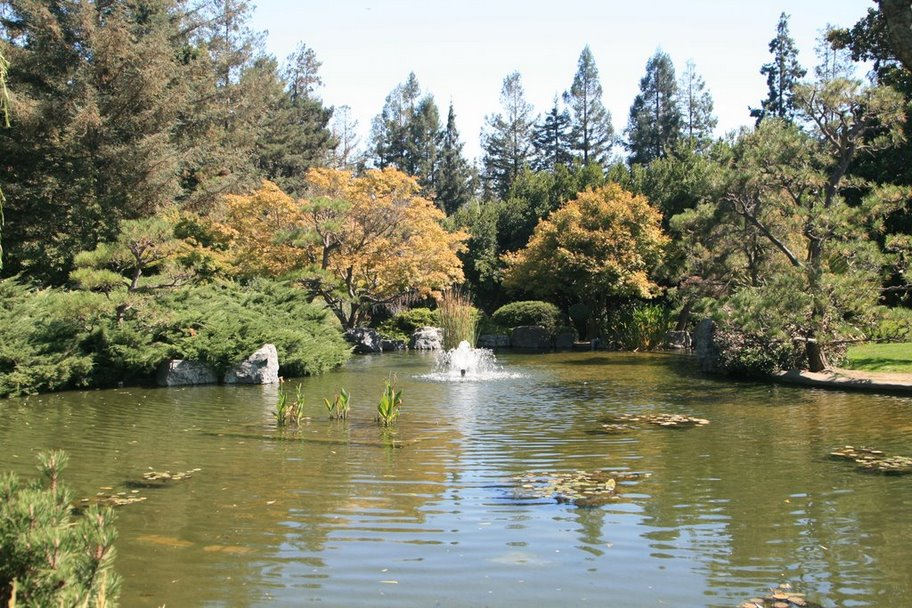
Japanese Friendship Garden at Kelley Park

The land that would become Kelley Park was purchased by Archer in 1861, and he planted 30 acres (12 ha) with cherry, apricot, and prune trees. He is credited with being the first farmer in Santa Clara County to use women and children to pick fruit. The 4 acres (1.6 ha) planted with cherry trees yielded an average annual income of US$3,000 (equivalent to $110,000 in 2025). Archer named his estate Lone Oak. The estate house he constructed was destroyed in a fire in May 1909, and a new estate house was completed on February 16, 1910, the day before Archer died.

His daughter Louise Archer married Martin J. Flavin (1849–1893) at Lone Oak in 1883; after Flavin's death, she married Frank Kelley (1858–1924), owner of the Star-Peerless Wallpaper Mills, in Chicago, where they lived with her four sons (Martin Flavin, 1883–1967; Frank Kelley Jr., 1894–1965; Kenneth Kelley; and Lawrence A. Kelley, 1897–1955).

The Kelley family moved back to California around 1910, as Louise inherited Lone Oak after the death of Judge Archer. Louise retained Charles Sumner Greene to design a conservatory, tile fountain, and servants' quarters for AR-KEL Villa, which were completed by the end of 1930.

=== City purchase ===
The house and 63 acres (25 ha) of land were sold to the City of San Jose in August 1951, to be used as a public park with the condition that Louise Kelley be allowed to live there for the rest of her life. According to History San José, Alden Campen, a prominent landowner and Jaycee in San Jose, learned the Kelley family was planning on selling the orchard in 1951 for a housing development, and since the city already owned the land east of Coyote Creek, he thought it could create a municipal golf course by purchasing the Kelley property and merging the parcels. However, the city lacked the funds, and so Campen joined with fellow Jaycees Ernie and Emily Renzel to purchase the initial 63-acre plot at a price of US$142,000 (equivalent to $1,760,000 in 2025), to be resold to the City on an annual basis. Louise Kelley died in February 1952 at the age of 89, and the city embarked on purchasing the rest of the AR-KEL/Lone Oak estate, eventually acquiring 156 acres (63 ha) bounded by Keyes Street (Story Road), Coyote Creek, Phelan Avenue, and Senter Road.

Campen and Renzel later approached the city to develop the Kelley property as a children's park in 1956, leading to the creation of Happy Hollow, which opened in 1961, followed by the Japanese Friendship Garden (1965), Leininger Center (1966), and the History Park Museum (construction started in 1965). Only the 1910 house and a later carriage house remain from the Archer/Kelley family's time owning the property. The 1910 estate house was damaged in a February 2012 fire, and portions of the roof and interior collapsed.
