= Viet Museum =

Museum in San Jose, California

Museum of the Boat People & the Republic of Vietnam
- Viện Bảo Tàng Việt Nam
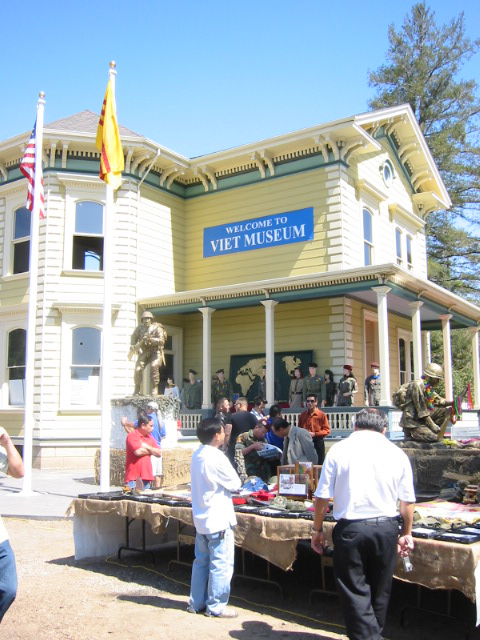
- Exterior of the Viet Museum (photo taken on the museum's opening day, August 25, 2007)
- Established: 25 August 2007
- Location: History Park at Kelley Park, San Jose, California
- Coordinates: 37°19′13″N 121°51′36″W
- Founder: Vũ Văn Lộc
- Public transit access: VTA Route 73

The Viet Museum (Vietnamese: Viện Bảo Tàng Việt Nam) or the Museum of the Boat People & the Republic of Vietnam is a museum focusing on the experience of Vietnamese Americans and their journey from Vietnam to the United States. It is located in Greenwalt House, a historical home relocated to History Park at Kelley Park in San Jose, California, United States, and was opened on August 25, 2007.

The museum was created by the San Jose-based nonprofit organization IRCC (Immigrant Resettlement & Cultural Center, Inc.), headed by Vũ Văn Lộc, a former colonel in the Army of the Republic of Vietnam. Planning for the Museum began in 1976, taking over 30 years to realize. It is believed to be the only museum in the world to exhibit artifacts related to the Vietnamese diaspora.

The Viet Museum's collections focus on three periods:

- 1950–1975: The Republic of Vietnam and the War in the name of Freedom
- 1975–1996: The "Boat People" and the quest for Freedom
- 1975–2007: Vietnamese Americans today and the building of Liberty
