= Portuguese Historical Museum =

Coordinates: 37°19′10.3″N 121°51′29.7″W

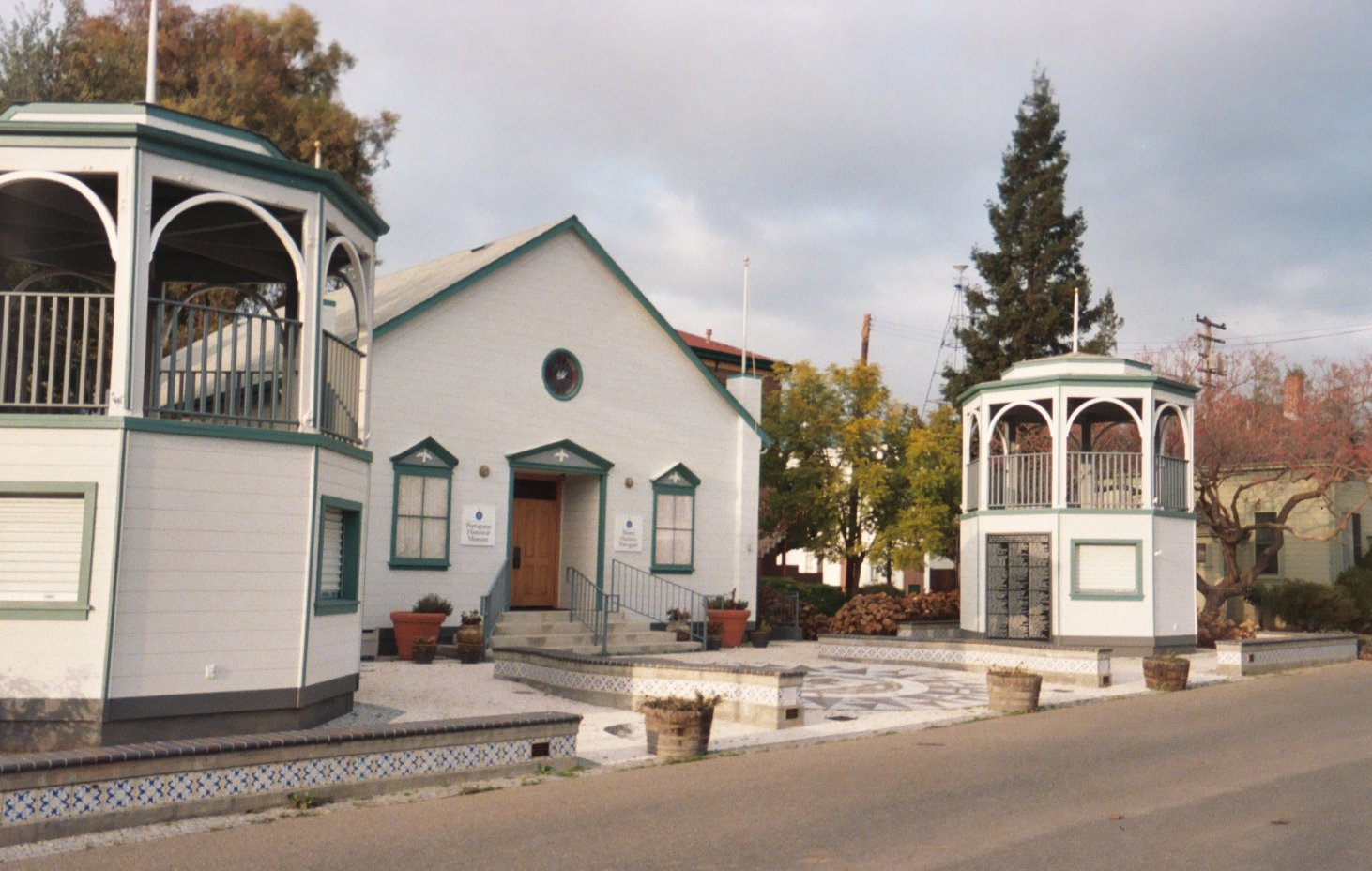
Portuguese Historical Museum

The Portuguese Historical Museum in San Jose, California, USA opened in 1997 and is a replica of the first permanent império (religious and cultural buildings primarily in the Azores) originally built in San Jose's Little Portugal district, c. 1915. It is one of the featured attractions within History Park at Kelley Park.

Exhibits start with Portugal as it was during the period of European colonization of the Americas and Portuguese immigration throughout the world, and it then narrows the focus to Portuguese immigration to the United States, then to California, and finally settling in the Santa Clara Valley.
