= Coyote Grange =

Coordinates: 37°13′02″N 121°44′23″W

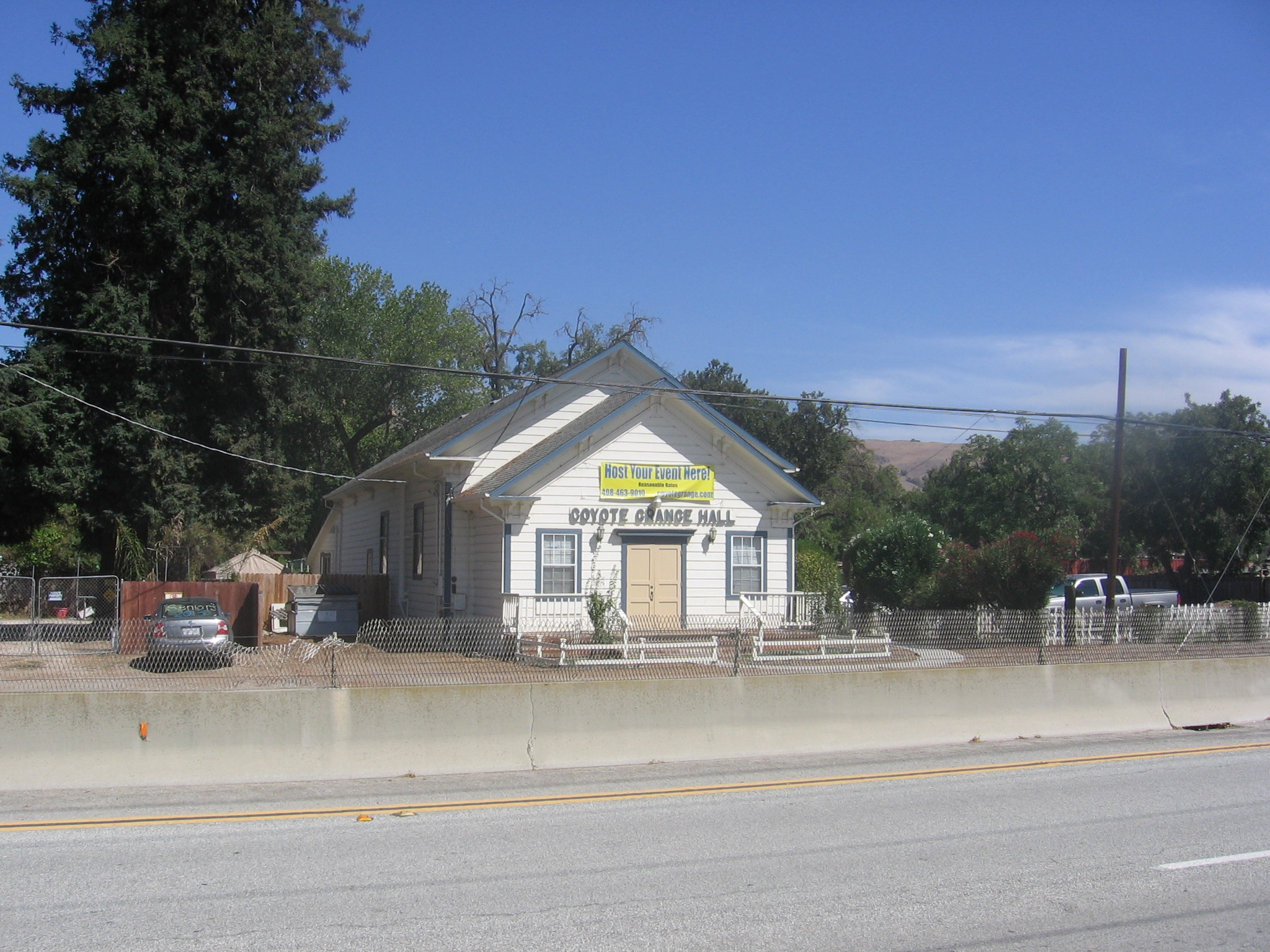
Coyote Grange Hall, September 22, 2012

Coyote Grange is Chapter 412 of the California State National Grange of the Order of Patrons of Husbandry. Its headquarters are an historic hall and gardens in Coyote, California, near San Jose.

The hall itself was built in 1902 on land deeded by Fiachro Fisher from his Coyote Valley estate. From its inception, the building was used as a community meeting place. The Coyote Grange Chapter was founded in 1925 and for many years rented the hall for its meetings. On May 5, 1949 the organization bought the building and surrounding gardens and still uses them today for its activities which include monthly dances, expeditions, potluck dinners, and a group for 13- to 17-year-olds, many of whom are home schoolers.

The Coyote Grange Hall is also used for meetings of the local 4-H club and other community organizations, and can be rented for private functions.

== Sources ==
- Coyote Grange on the official web site of the California State Grange. Retrieved 3 August 2014.
- 'A matter of heritage', Morgan Hill Times, December 27, 2002. Retrieved 8 June 2008.
- Timely Topics, Newsletter of the 4-H Youth Development Program, University of California's Santa Clara County Cooperative Extension Service and the Santa Clara County 4-H Club Council, April 2006. Retrieved 8 June 2008.
- History of Coyote, High Desert Drifters. Retrieved 8 June 2008.
