= Coyote, California =

Unincorporated community in California, United States

Coyote
- Unincorporated community
- Location within California Location within the United States
- Coordinates: 37°13′00″N 121°44′26″W
- Country: United States
- State: California
- County: Santa Clara
- Time zone: UTC-8 (Pacific (PST))
  - Summer (DST): UTC-7 (PDT)
- ZIP code: 95013
- Area codes: 408, 669
- GNIS feature ID: 252656

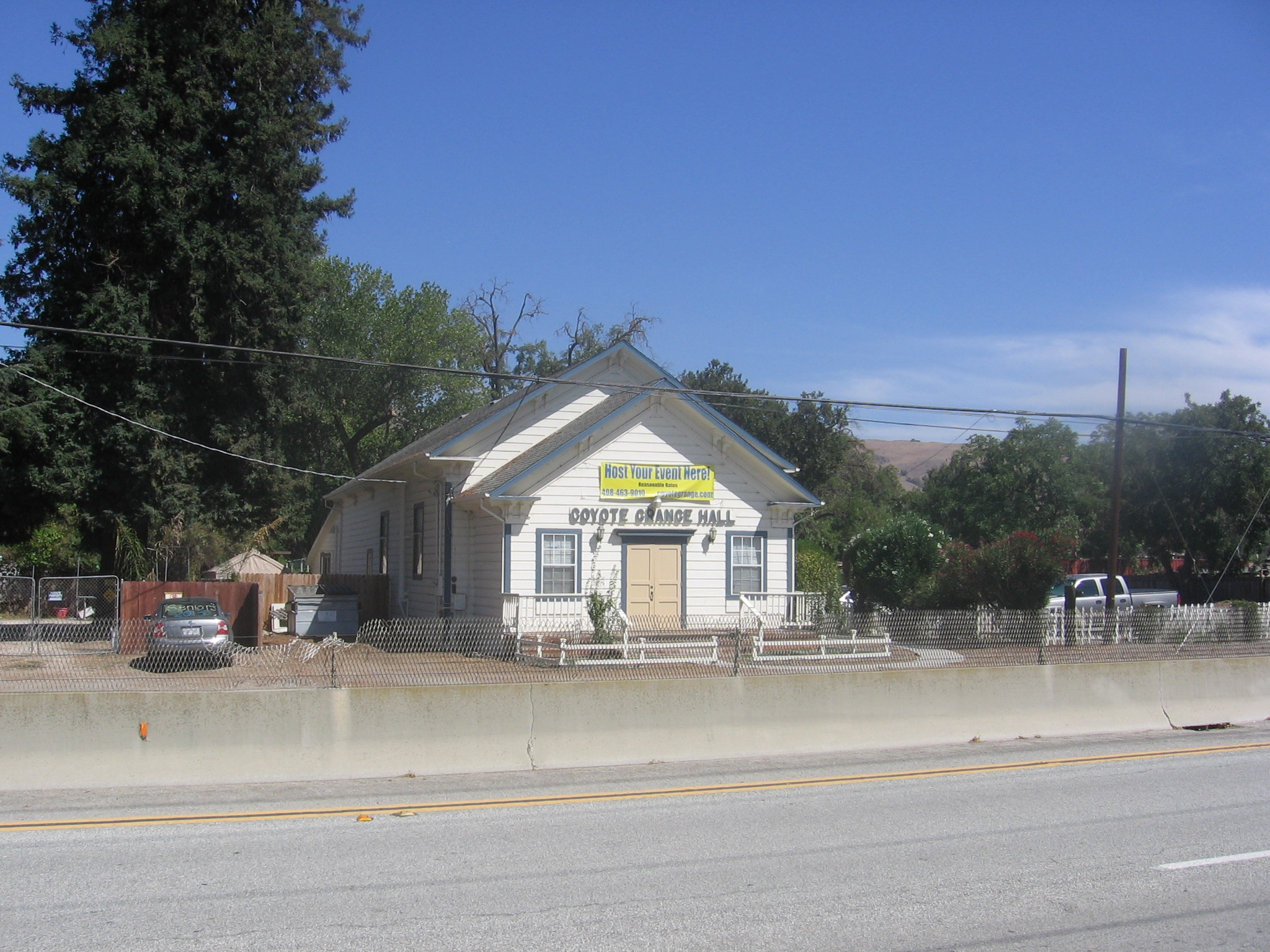
Coyote Grange Hall, September 22, 2012

Coyote is an unincorporated community in Santa Clara Valley astride Coyote Creek and between San Jose and Morgan Hill's Madrone district in Santa Clara County, California, United States. Part of Coyote is inside the city limits of San Jose. Its ZIP Code is 95013, and there is a small U.S. Post Office. It is inside telephone area codes 408 and 669.

== History ==
Once the site of the Twelve Mile House (a stagecoach station on the Butterfield Overland Mail route), Coyote is notable for its historic Grange Hall, close to the Post Office and the nearby Metcalf Energy Center. The town's name was changed from Burnett to Coyote because residents saw many coyotes in the area. The town nearly disappeared after U.S. Route 101 was rerouted as a freeway about one kilometer (0.6 mile) east of the town. The community was nearly absorbed by San Jose's urban sprawl, until the collapse of the dot-com bubble canceled the city's plans. San Jose, however, still owns much of the land in the area after purchasing it prior to 2001.

== Climate ==
Due to the moderating influence of the Pacific Ocean, Coyote enjoys a mild, Mediterranean climate. Temperatures range from an average midsummer maximum of 32.3°C (90.2°F) to an average midwinter low of 0.9 °C (33.6 °F). Average annual precipitation is 480 mm (18.9 in), and the summer months are typically dry. Snowfall is rare, about once every 20 years, and is light and short-lived when it occurs. Summer months are characterized by coastal fog which arrives from the ocean around 10 p.m. and dissipates the next morning by 10 a.m. Winter months have many sunny and partly cloudy days, with frequent breaks between rainstorms. The local terrain is inconducive to tornadoes, severe windstorms and thunderstorms. The local climate supports chaparral and grassland biomes, with stands of live oak at higher elevations.

== Transportation ==
- Bicycle path - Coyote Creek Trail

=== Major highways ===
- U.S. Route 101

== Education ==
The Morgan Hill Unified School District serves the community.

== See also ==
- Coyote station
