= Cycling in San Jose, California =

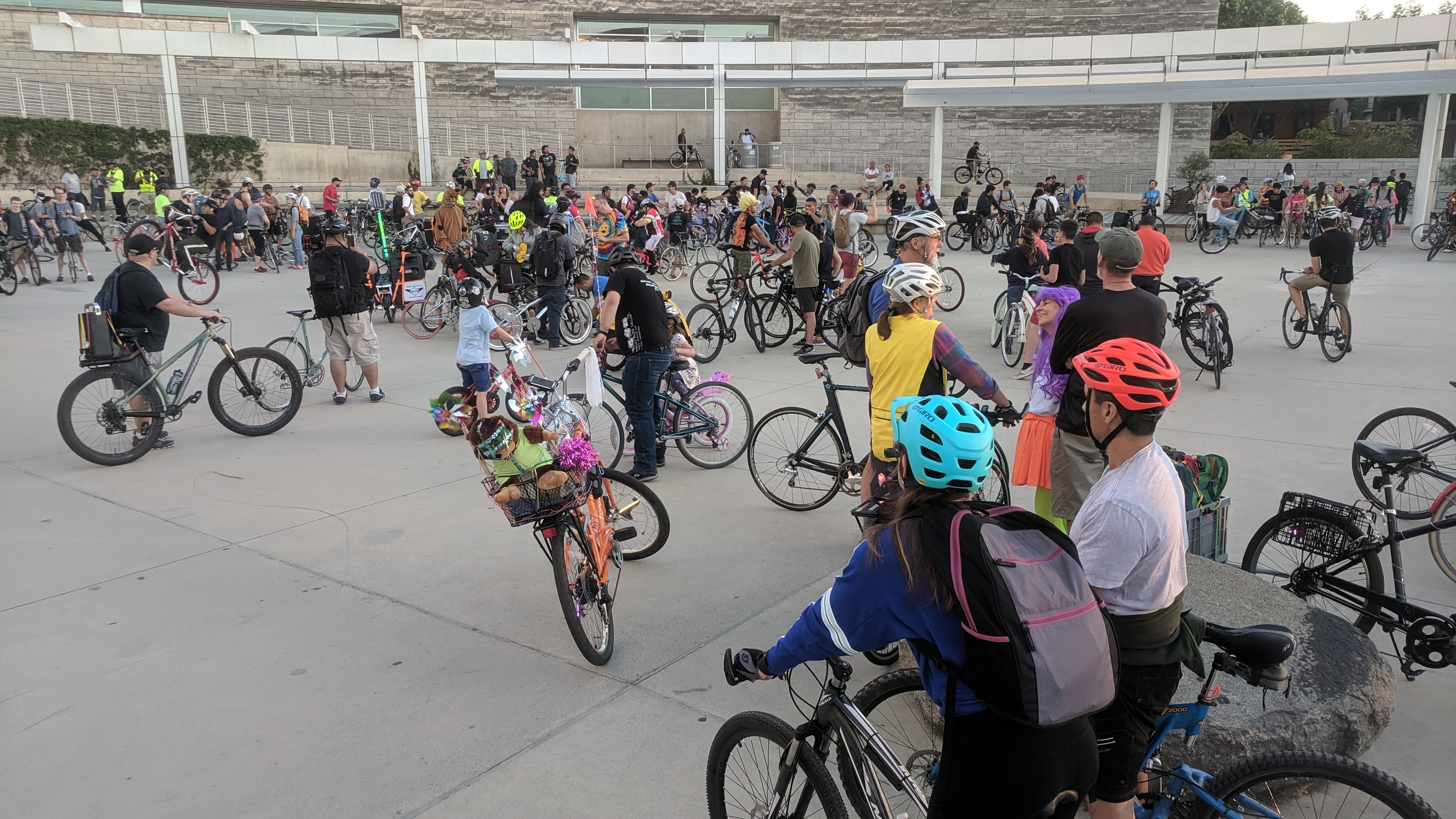
San Jose Bike Party gathers at San Jose City Hall in June 2019

The American city of San Jose, California has various cycling routes on roads and trails used by both commuters and recreational riders. The city has plans to expand the current 285 miles (459 km) of bike lanes to 400 miles (640 km), and the current 60 miles (97 km) of trails to 100 miles (160 km). San Jose was ranked as a bronze-level bicycle-friendly community by the League of American Bicyclists.

== City planning ==
Bicycle planning in San Jose is handled by the city's Department of Transportation.

=== San Jose Bike Plan 2020 ===
The San Jose City Council passed the "San Jose Bike Plan 2020" in November 2009. It was a set of goals intended to be implemented by 2020 if possible, or otherwise make progress in those directions. The goals were as follows:

- Complete 500 miles of the Bikeway Network by 2020
- Achieve 5% of all trips taken by Bike by 2020
- Reduce bike collision rate by 50% by 2020
- Add 5000 bike parking spaces by 2020
- Achieve Gold-level Bicycle Friendly Community status by 2020

City officials traveled to Copenhagen in 2014 to observe how that city achieved 50% of trips by bicycle.

The San Francisco Bay Area Planning and Urban Research Association (SPUR) reported from a panel discussion at an event they hosted in 2017 that the question came up why San Jose didn't see as much increase in cycling usage as expected after a round of bike lane construction. The panelists concluded that the unprotected bike lanes tend to only attract experienced riders. The panel said new less-experienced riders tend to want protected bike lanes before they will be attracted to ride more.

=== San Jose Better Bike Plan 2025 ===
The San Jose Better Bike Plan 2025 will supersede Bike Plan 2020. It has been in development since 2018. It is expected for release in early 2020.

== County-wide planning ==
Cycling in the city of San Jose can't just be viewed in isolation because it is bordered by other cities within Santa Clara County. County-wide bicycle and pedestrian planning is done by the Valley Transportation Authority (VTA) because it was formed by a merger of the county transit agency with the congestion management districts of the county and all the cities in the county.

== Cycling infrastructure ==
The city has plans to expand the current 285 miles (459 km) of bike lanes to 400 miles (640 km), and the current 60 miles (97 km) of trails to 100 miles (160 km).

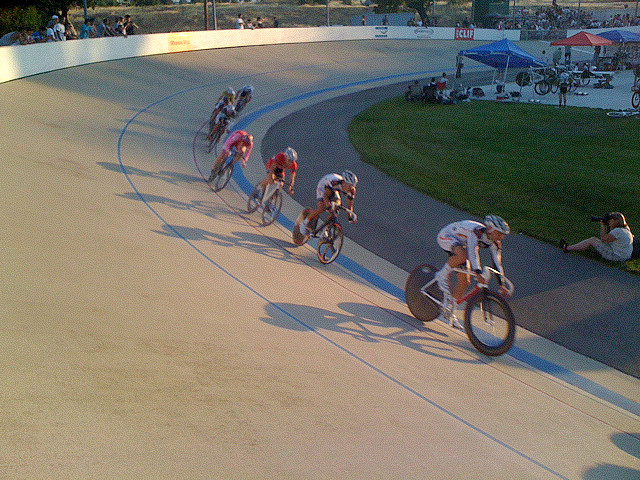
Hellyer Park Velodrome

Hellyer Park Velodrome is located in Hellyer County Park next to the Coyote Creek Trail. It was built in 1963. It served as the site of the 1972 US Olympic bicycling team tryouts. The velodrome was renovated in 2007. It is operated by the Northern California Velodrome Association, a 501(c)3 non-profit corporation.

San Jose International Airport has bicycle racks in both the Terminal A and B parking structures.

=== Bikes on transit ===
VTA buses have racks in front with capacity for 2 bikes. VTA light rail has 4 racks and room for 4 more cyclists holding their bicycles in each train car.

Bay Area Rapid Transit (BART), which is planned to open in San Jose at the Berryessa/North San Jose station and in Milpitas (next to the border of San Jose) at the Milpitas station in 2020, has rules for bicycles restricting using the first car at any time, the first 3 cars during commute hours, or any crowded car. Cyclists are also prohibited from using station escalators, and must instead use stairs or elevators.

Caltrain normally runs 2 or 3 bike cars per train. Cyclists are required to use the bike cars. Caltrain does not allow bicycles to be locked on board.

Amtrak California Capitol Corridor normally runs 2 bike cars per train. Other train cars have 3 bike racks on the lower level. Amtrak recommends locking bicycles to the racks.

=== Trail network ===
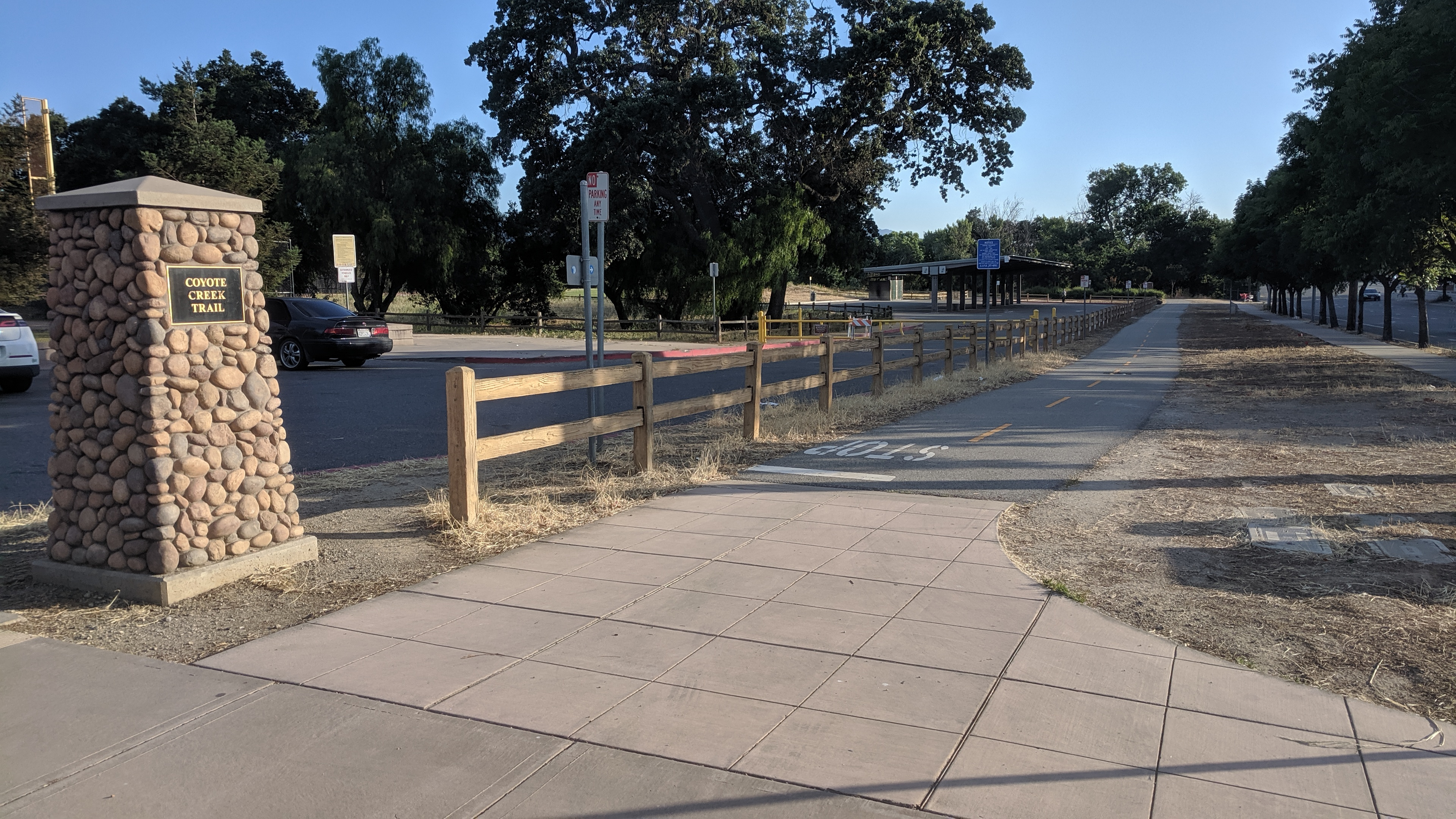
Coyote Creek Trail entrance at Tully Road

The off-street trail network in San Jose consists mostly of routes along waterways and highways.

- Coyote Creek Trail, from Tully Road in East San Jose to Anderson Dam in Morgan Hill
- Guadalupe River Trail, in two disconnected segments from Alviso to downtown and Highway 85 to Almaden Lake Park
- Highway 87 Bikeway, along Highway 87 from Tamien train station to Highway 85
- Highway 237 Bikeway, along Highway 237 in North San Jose connecting to Milpitas, Santa Clara and Sunnyvale
- Los Alamitos Creek Trail, in the Almaden Valley from Almaden Lake Park
- Los Gatos Creek Trail, two disconnected segments in downtown San Jose and from Meridian Avenue to Vasona Lake County Park and downtown Los Gatos
- Penitencia Creek Trail, in the Berryessa district from Alum Rock Park to the Berryessa BART Station
- Three Creeks Trail, a rail trail in the Willow Glen district

=== Commercial bicycle rental ===
Besides rentals available at bike shops, the City of San Jose has also permitted Bay Wheels (formerly known as Ford GoBike) to operate a bike sharing system in the city. As of December 2019, the bike sharing system does not have permits from any other city in the county.

== Events and organizations ==
Various bicycling events and organizations in San Jose include social riding, commuting and bicycle advocacy.

=== San Jose Bike Party ===
San Jose Bike Party has since 2007 done monthly rides on the 3rd Friday of the month, which can attract thousands of riders in Summer months. Bike Party is a social event, not a protest.

=== Silicon Valley Bicycle Coalition ===
Silicon Valley Bicycle Coalition (SVBC) is a bicycle advocacy organization covering Santa Clara and San Mateo Counties.

=== Bike to Work Day ===
Bay Area Bike to Work Day encourages commuters to try out cycling. "Energizer Stations" sponsored and operated by various local organizations or companies scattered along various commute routes hand out food, drinks and swag bags. In Santa Clara County, the local organizer of Bike to Work Day is SVBC.

=== Viva Calle San Jose ===
Since 2015 and now held each Spring and Fall, Viva Calle San Jose is a street festival where a pre-announced route of several miles of streets is temporarily closed for hours during the day to vehicle traffic and opened to pedestrians, bicycles, scooters, skateboards, etc.

== See also ==
- Bicycle law in California
- Complete streets
