= Malaguerra Winery =

Historic house in Santa Clara County, California, United States

- U.S. National Register of Historic Places
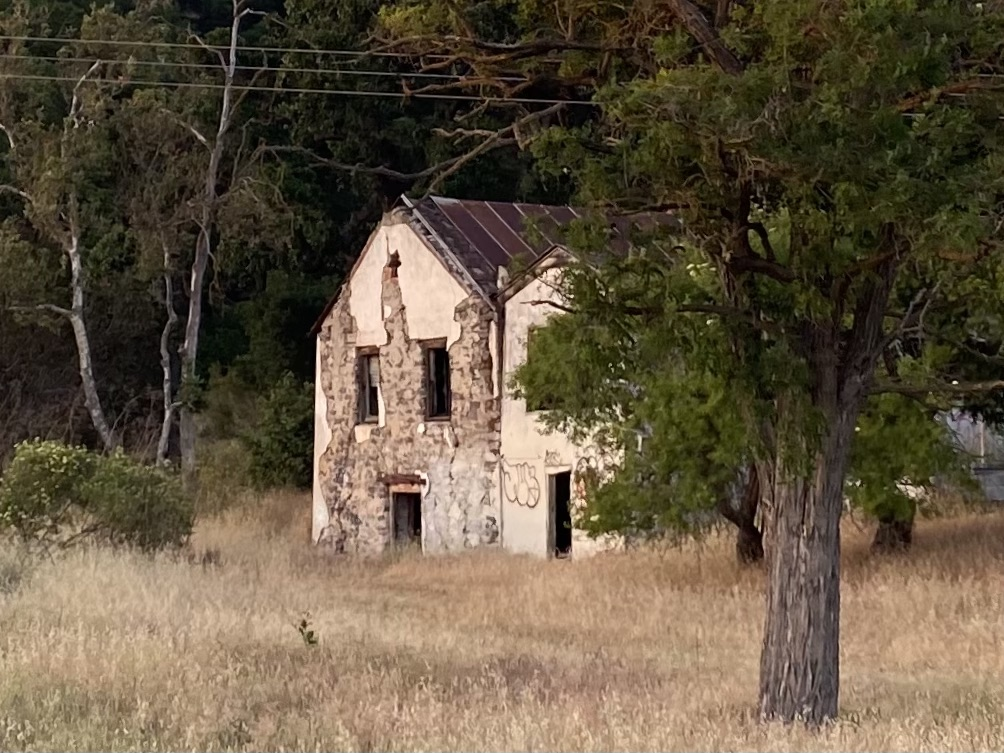
- Malaguerra Winery

- Location within California Location within the United States
- Location: N. of Morgan Hill on Burnett Ave., Morgan Hill, California, US
- Coordinates: 37°10′09″N 121°39′19″W
- Area: 15 acres (6.1 ha)
- Built: 1869
- NRHP reference No.: 80000858
- Added to NRHP: October 23, 1980

The Malaguerra Winery is a historic winery located in Morgan Hill, California. The two-story winery is the oldest remaining winery structure in Santa Clara County, which stands at the eastern edge of the Valley and the foothills of the Diablo Range. It was constructed in 1869 for ranchero José María Malaguerra. The Malaguerra Winery was placed on the National Register of Historic Places on October 23, 1980.

== History ==
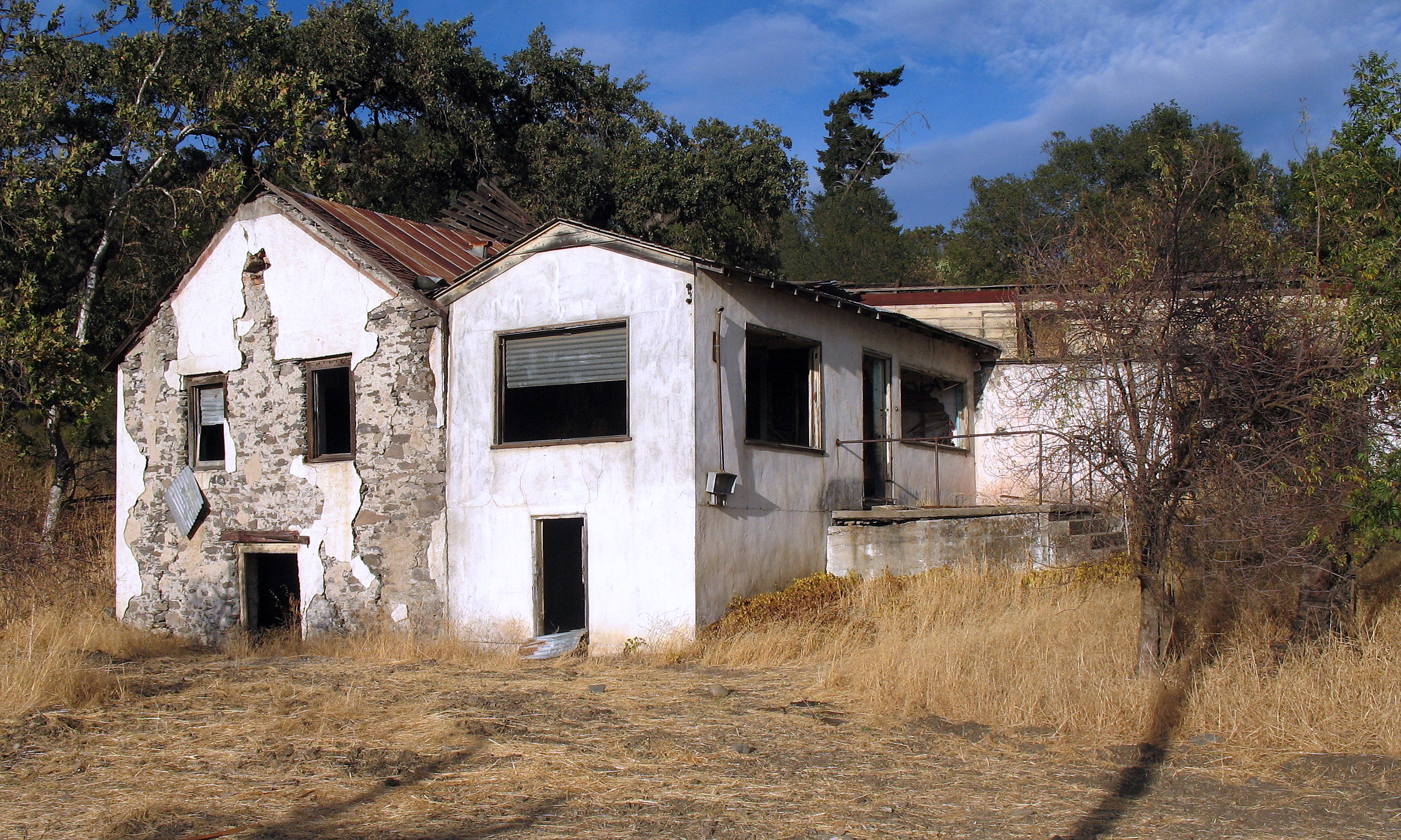
The oldest part of the structure built in 1869 is on the left. The newer part on the right was built after 1904.

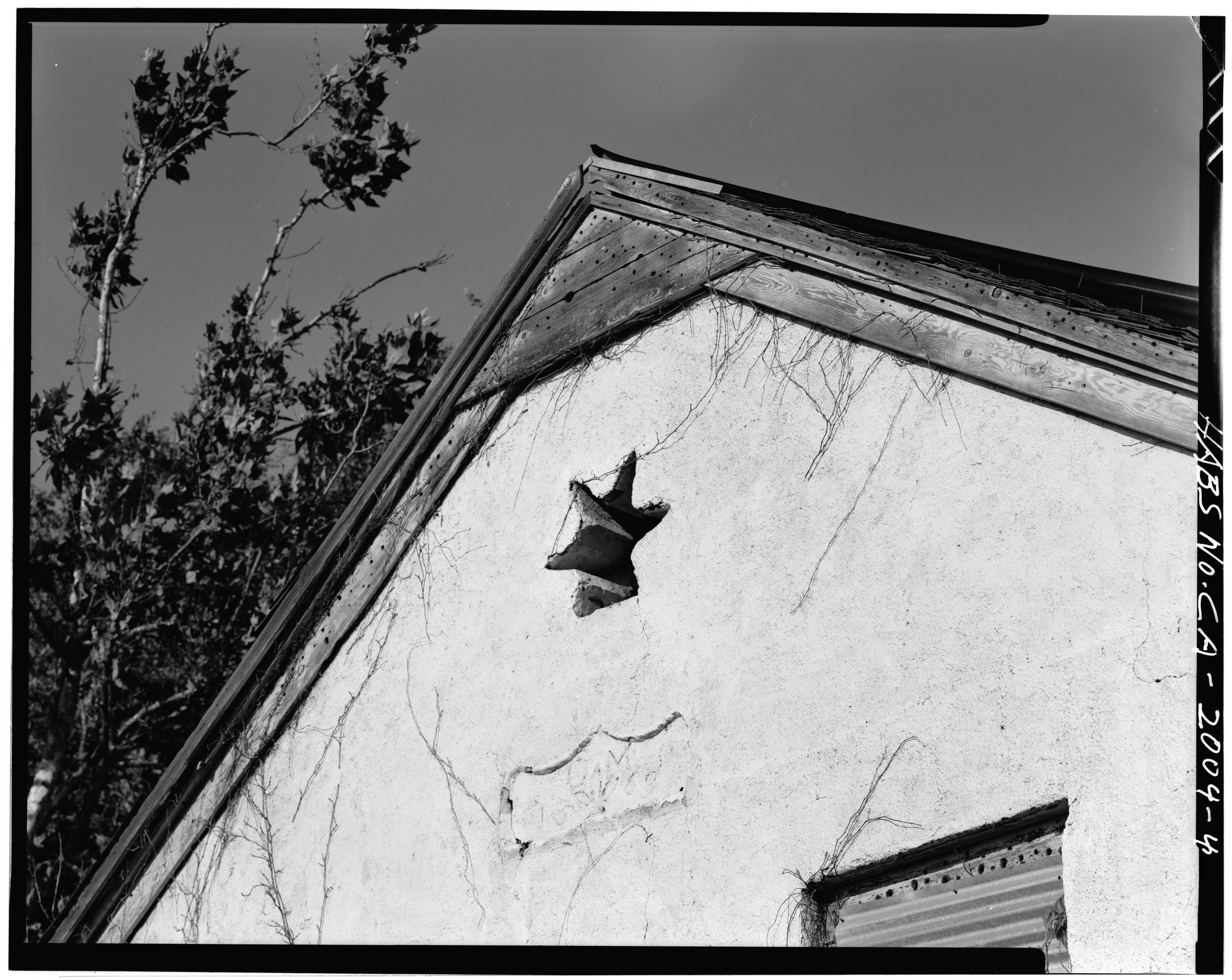
Star In West Gable and Plaque with initials C M and 1869.

By the late 1850s, Swiss immigrant and Californio ranchero José María Malaguerra began cultivating vineyards in Madrone, Morgan Hill, California, then an independent township just north of Morgan Hill. In 1861, Malaguerra and his wife, Alvina, acquired a 200 acres (81 ha) parcel of Rancho Refugio de la Laguna Seca from Liberata Piatti, the widow of Californio pioneer William Fisher. In a collaborative effort, they cultivated grapevines and tomato plants, tended to hogs. Over the years, the Malaguerras brought up 11 children.

In 1869, he founded the Malaguerra Winery, the oldest existing winery in Santa Clara Valley. The Malaguerra Winery is situated at the eastern border of the Santa Clara Valley, with the foothills of the Diablo Range rising just behind it. The original northwest section of the Malaguerra Winery also served as a space for the family to air-cure homemade sausage and salami, suspending the pork casings from the rafters within the building. While other wineries from the same era have gone on to produce nationally renowned wines, the majority of their original winery buildings have been replaced over time. The cultivation of grapes on a commercial scale commenced in this region during the early 1850s, and by 1860, Malaguerra was one of the twenty-six winemakers in the county. The Malaguerra Wine enterprise can be viewed as a representative example of the viticultural development in Santa Clara County.

During the mid-1890s, a national economic downturn and this, combined with the "Wine War," a period characterized by excessive grape planting following the resolution of the Phylloxera problem, led to the closure of many local wineries, including the Malaguerra business's demise in 1898. The Malaguerra operation, however, experienced a revival and expansion at the turn of the 20th century under the management of Augustino A. Guglieri. The involvement of Italian immigrants in the wine production industry became a hallmark of Santa Clara County, as exemplified by the Malaguerra Winery. In 1920, the Guglieri family sold the property to John Traverse, who owned and oversaw it until 1950. Subsequently, for nearly fifteen years, the former Malaguerra Wine operation functioned as a chicken farm during the 1960s.

Since 1971, the Malaguerra estate has been under the supervision of the County of Santa Clara, acting as a connection between Anderson Lake and the Coyote Creek Parkway. The entire property was granted a lease by the County of Santa Clara to the Friends of the Winemakers. Reports from the late 1970s described the group as being committed to renovating the building into a functioning wine museum and redesigning the grounds with historically accurate grape varieties, all with some degree of collaboration with the California Department of Parks and Recreation.

== Design ==
Malaguerra Winery, Burnett Road, Morgan Hill, Santa Clara County, CA.

The Malaguerra Winery is on an unevenly shaped 15 acres (6.1 ha) tract of land. The Winery complex consists of four distinct sections. Of these, two hold historical significance: the initial rubblestone winery building, dating back to 1869, and an adjoining rubblestone barn added in 1904. The remaining two sections are modern additions that will be eliminated as part of the planned restoration.

The two-story winery building is positioned within the northwest section of the Malaguerra Winery complex. It has an almost square layout, measuring 22 feet (6.7 m) by 24 feet (7.3 m), and is constructed from basalt rubblestone sourced from the nearby Coyote Creek. The exterior walls have been finished with stucco and painted white. The gable roof of this structure is largely concealed by the expansive roof of the adjoining barn. There is no chimney present, but the kitchen features gas-fired space heaters for warmth. On the north side, there's an aluminum-framed casement window that opens into the kitchen. All the windows feature generously recessed interior reveals.

On the west side of the building, a double wooden door grants entry to the basement. The basement comprises a spacious single room, divided by four wooden posts that provide support for the floor above. Access to the main floor, at the upper level of the winery building, can be found on the south side through a contemporary stuccoed frame addition.

Around the turn of the century, the barn was added to the complex. Given the sloped terrain on which it stands, the original winery building was designed without an interior staircase, as both the basement and main floors of the barn are accessible at ground level. The rectangular barn measures 31 feet (9.4 m) by 88 feet (27 m) and is founded on basalt stone foundations. The basalt rubblestone walls, extending up to a height of 8 feet (2.4 m), have been painted white. Above this, a 4 feet (1.2 m)-high wooden frame wall, clad with ship-lapped siding, completes the structure. The barn features a spacious single interior area. Its roof is supported by an exposed, rugged truss system, which includes a tie beam, queen posts, collar beam, two diagonal struts above the collar beam, and, at irregular intervals, diagonal braces that bolster the lower section of the system. The barn's roof extends over and effectively covers almost the entire roof of the original stone winery building.

Between 1930 and 1950, an extension comprising a living and sitting room was integrated into the 1869 structure. The main floor has served as a living space and is sectioned into three rooms by wooden partitions, which do not seem to be part of the original structure. All four interior walls have been plastered, and the floor is composed of 2 inches (50.8 mm)-wide soft wooden boards. On the main floor's west-facing facade, there are two one-over-one sash windows. There's also a star-shaped unglazed opening in the gable of this facade, likely designed for attic ventilation. Below the star is a cartouche that bears the initials "C-M" and the date 1869. Given that Malaguerra's wife was Alvina Collins, it's plausible that these initials "C-M" could represent their combined monogram.

== Historical significance ==
Registration for the Malaguerra Winery to be placed on the placed on the National Register of Historic Places dates back to December 2, 1976. The winery was placed on the National Register on October 23, 1980. This winery holds historical significance under the criteria of Agriculture and Industry. The Malaguerra Wine operation represents the early stages of wine cultivation in Santa Clara County, and for demonstrating the role played by Italian immigrants in shaping the local wine production industry.

== See also ==
- National Register of Historic Places listings in Santa Clara County, California
