= Vasona Reservoir =

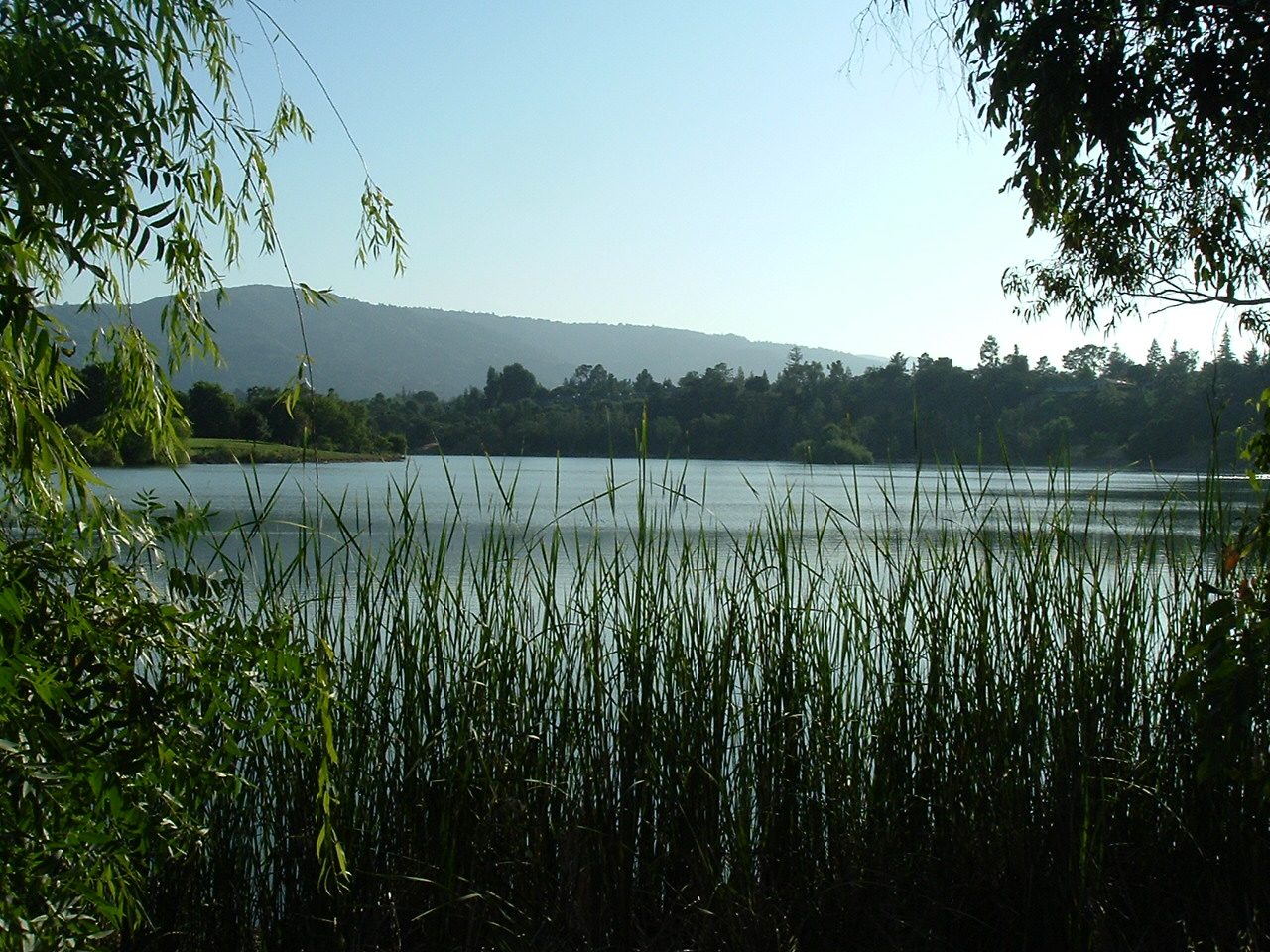
- June 2006

- Location within California Location within the United States
- Location: Los Gatos, California
- Coordinates: 37°14′48″N 121°57′54″W
- Type: Reservoir
- Primary inflows: Los Gatos Creek
- Primary outflows: Los Gatos Creek
- Catchment area: 44.2 sq mi (114 km^{2})
- Basin countries: United States
- Managing agency: Santa Clara Valley Water District
- Surface area: 57 acres (23 ha)
- Water volume: 495 acre⋅ft (611,000 m^{3})

Vasona Reservoir is an artificial lake located in Los Gatos, California, United States. A 152-acre (62 ha) county park surrounds the reservoir and provides limited fishing ("catch and release"), picnicking, and informal play activities. Although swimming is not allowed, human-powered boating is permitted in the reservoir.

== History ==
The reservoir was formed by the Vasona Percolating Dam, built in 1935 (91 years ago) across Los Gatos Creek. It is the smallest reservoir owned by the Santa Clara Valley Water District.

Albert August Vollmer, who came to the area in 1887, named the area after a pony he had had as a child.

== Vasona Dam ==
Vasona Dam is an earthen dam 34 feet (10 m) high and 1,000 feet (300 m) long. Its crest is 307 feet (94 m) above sea level. New gates were installed in the dam in 1997.

== Vasona Lake County Park ==
Vasona Lake County Park is one of 28 Santa Clara County Parks. The 152-acre (62 ha) park surrounds the reservoir, with Oak Meadow Park adjacent to the west. The reservoir offers fishing for black bass, crappie, catfish and bluegill.

== See also ==
- List of dams and reservoirs in California
- List of lakes in California
- List of lakes in the San Francisco Bay Area
