= Santa Clara County Parks and Recreation Department =

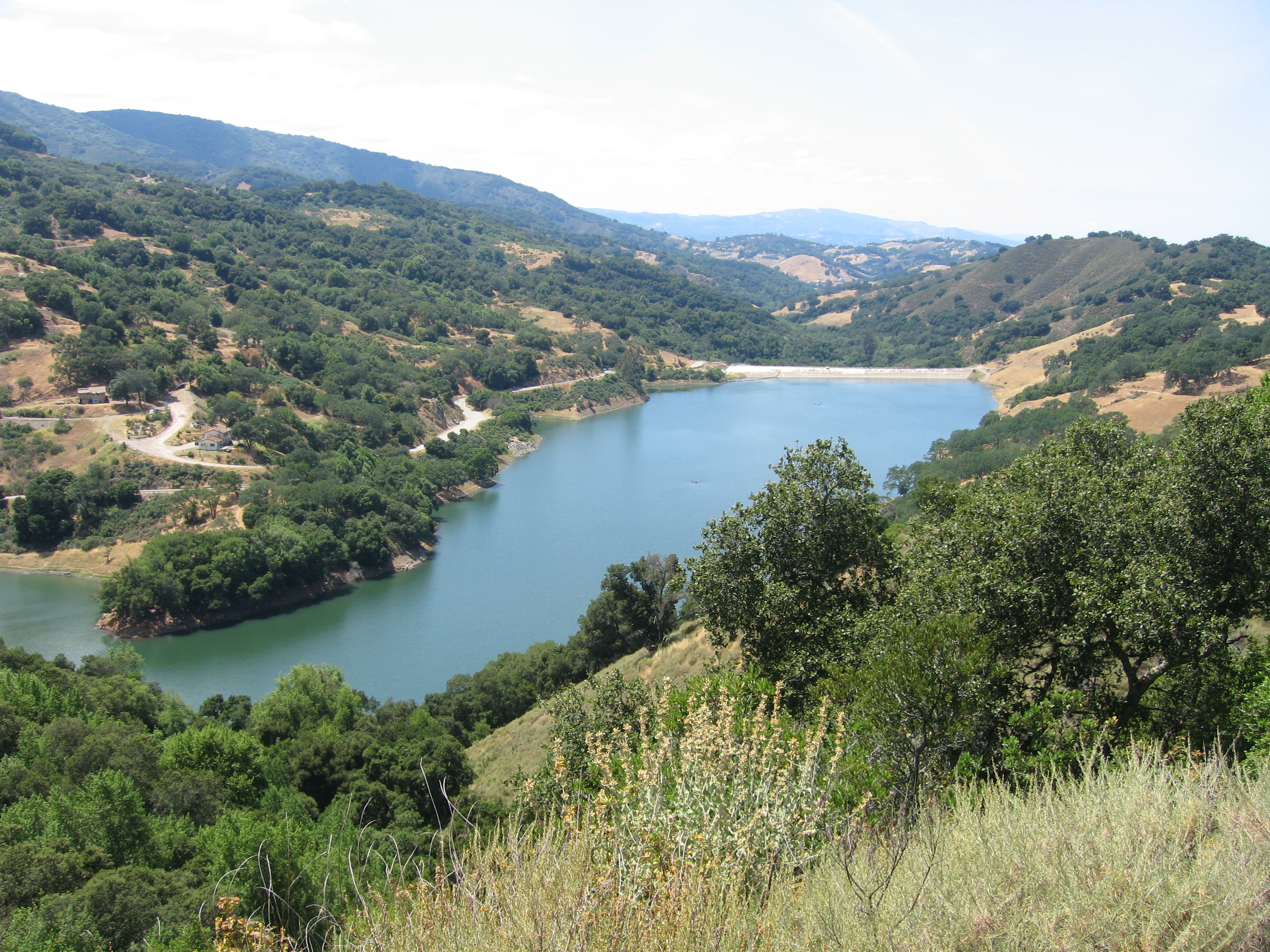
- Guadalupe Reservoir, in Almaden Quicksilver County Park

Agency overview
- Formed: 1956
- Headquarters: 5965 Silver Creek Valley Road San Jose, California 95138; 37.2439°N 121.9648°W
- Website: www.sccgov.org/sites/parks/Pages/Welcome-to-Santa-Clara-County-Parks.aspx

Santa Clara County Parks and Recreation Department, sometimes referred to as Santa Clara County Parks Department or Santa Clara County Parks, is a government department in Santa Clara County, California. The department manages 28 parks with a total area over 55,000 acres (22,000 ha).

== History ==
Santa Clara County's first parkland was purchased in on January 24, 1924 from Joseph M. Mac Donough and Bessie P. MacDonough, a 400-acre (160 ha) parcel near Cupertino which eventually became Stevens Creek County Park. Mount Madonna park was acquired in 1927. The Parks and Recreation Department was founded in 1956. A major expansion with numerous additional parks became possible in the 1970s with the availability of state funds and voter-approved tax setasides. A Master Plan was adopted in 1972 which called for major regional parks throughout the area as well as recreational corridors along creeks. In 1995 the county adopted a Master Plan for trails emphasizing connections between park trails and trails of other agencies.

A separate agency, established in 1993, is the Santa Clara Valley Open Space Authority (SCCOSA). While the jurisdiction of the SCCOSA lies entirely in Santa Clara County, it is not directly a part of county government.

== Parks ==
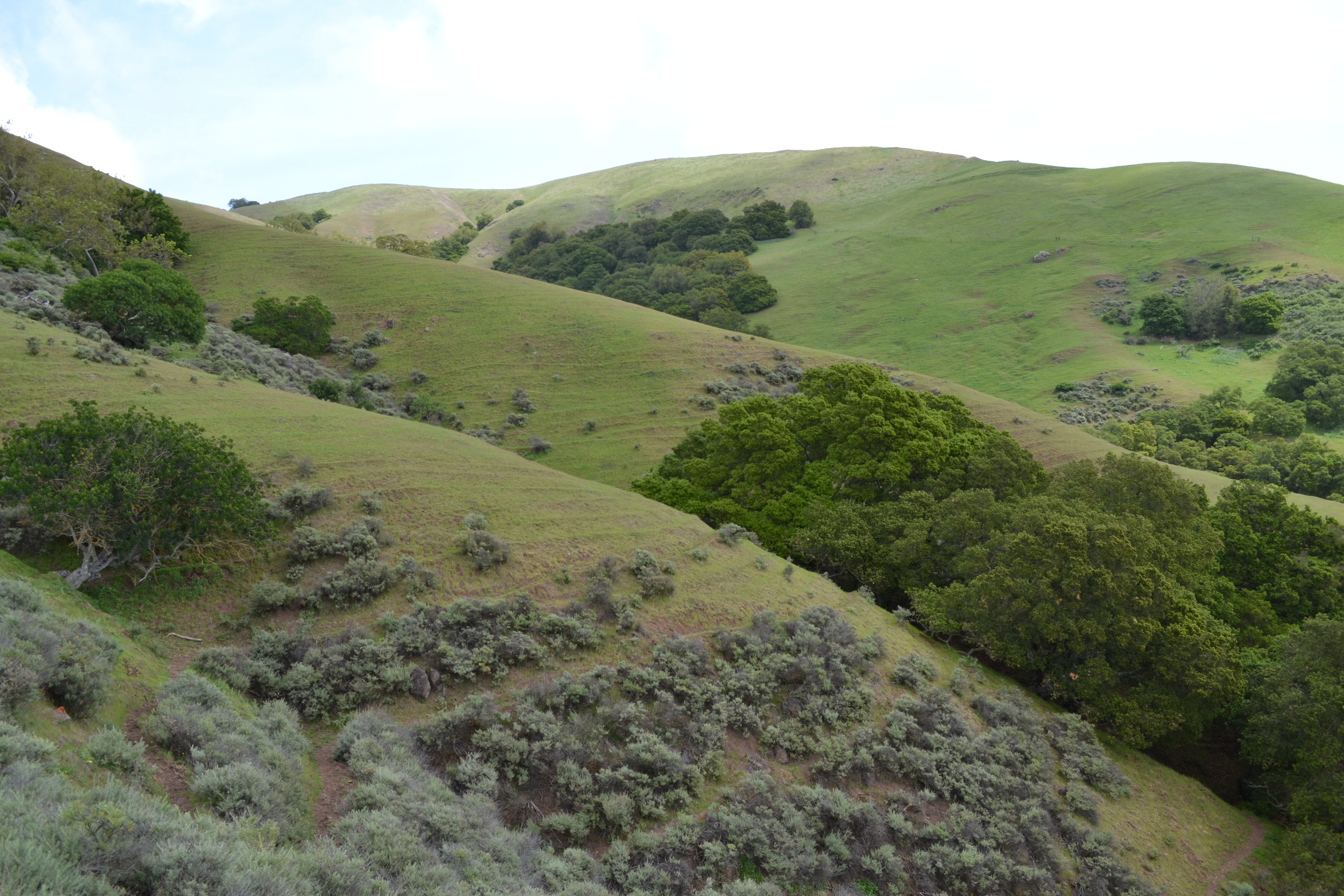
Diablo Range in Ed R. Levin County Park

Coyote Peak in Santa Teresa County Park

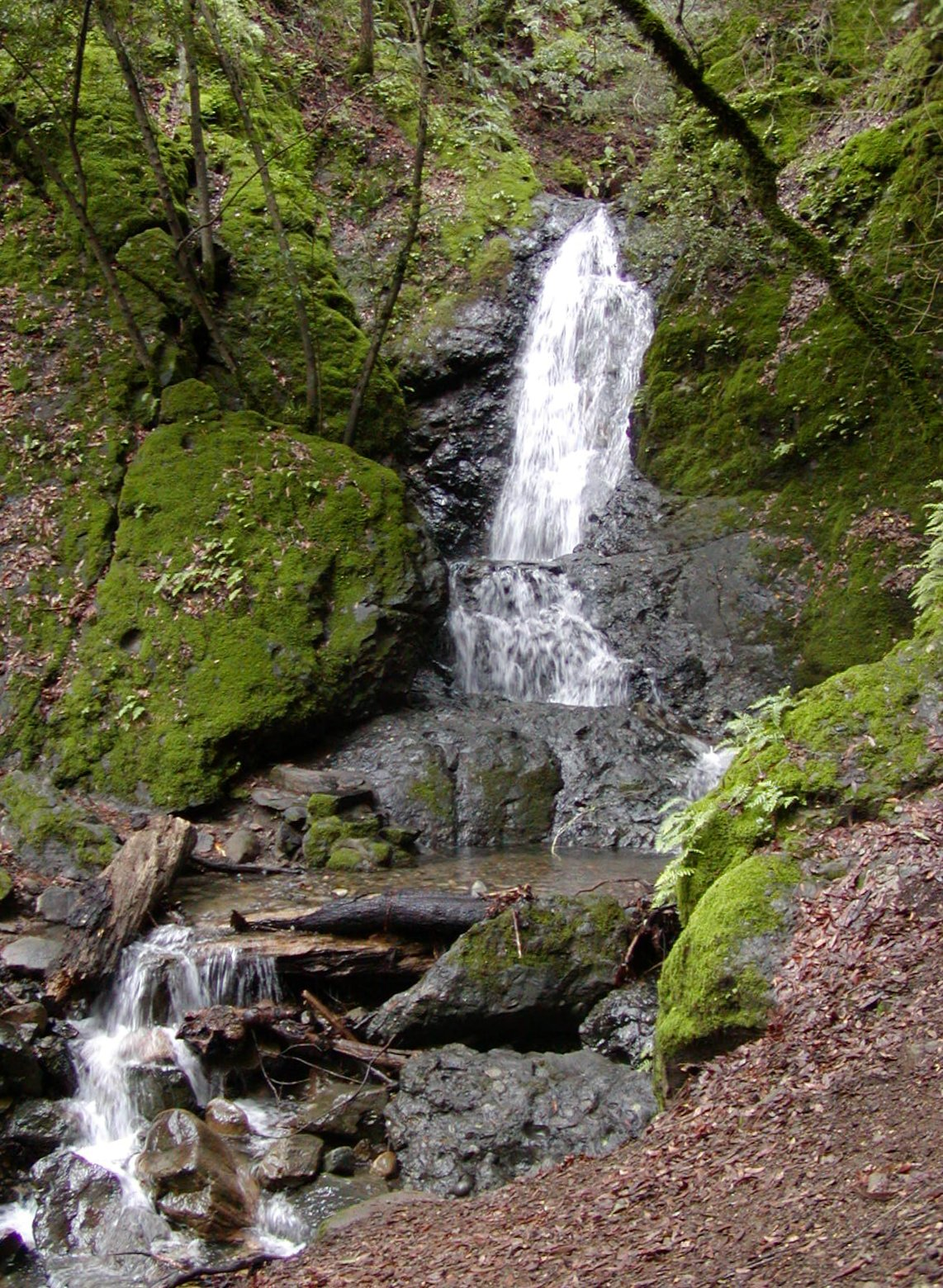
Basin Falls in Uvas Canyon County Park

The parks managed by the department are:

- Almaden Quicksilver County Park, including the Guadalupe Reservoir: former site of the New Almaden mercury mine; purchased by the County in 1976. In 1978 the County also purchased the historic Casa Grande and converted it into the New Almaden Quicksilver Mining Museum.
- Alviso Marina County Park
- Anderson Lake County Park
- Calero County Park
- Chesbro Reservoir County Park
- Chitactac-Adams Heritage County Park
- Coyote Creek Parkway
- Coyote Lake Harvey Bear Ranch County Park
- Ed R. Levin County Park
- Field Sports Park
- Hellyer County Park
- Joseph D. Grant County Park
- Lexington Reservoir County Park
- Los Gatos Creek County Park
- Martial Cottle Park
- Motorcycle County Park
- Mt. Madonna County Park
- Penitencia Creek
- Rancho San Antonio County Park (operated by Mid-Peninsula Regional Open Space)
- Sanborn County Park
- Santa Teresa County Park
- Stevens Creek County Park
- Sunnyvale Baylands (operated by the City of Sunnyvale)
- Upper Stevens Creek County Park
- Uvas Canyon County Park
- Uvas Reservoir County Park
- Vasona Lake County Park
- Villa Montalvo County Park

== Park Ranger Division ==
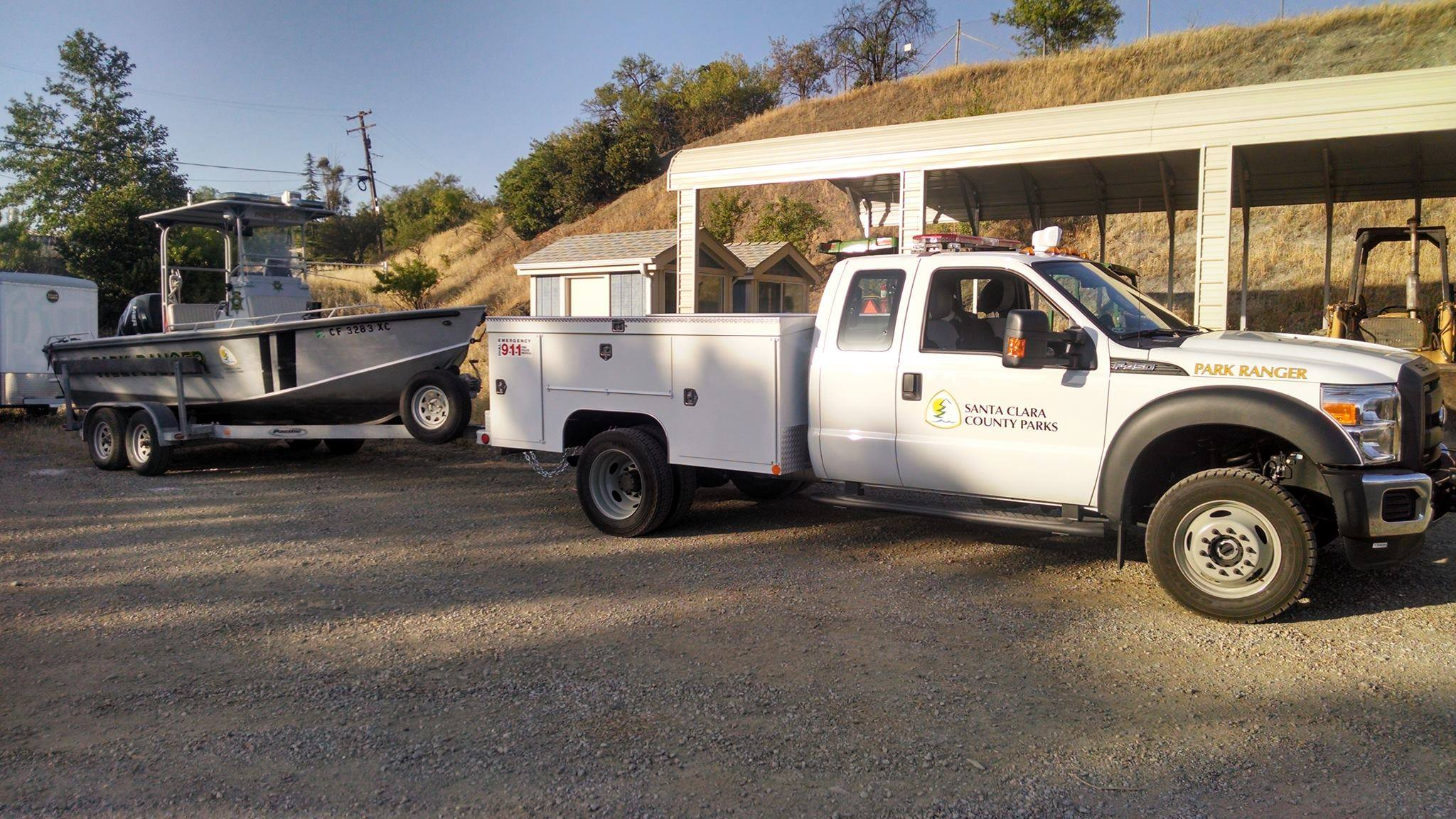
Santa Clara County Park Ranger patrol truck and patrol boat

County Park Rangers act as the public safety branch for the Santa Clara County Parks, ensuring the safety of park visitors and protection of park resources. County Park Rangers are considered "generalists" and perform the full range of Park Ranger duties including enforcing State laws and Department rules as peace officers, providing information to visitors, checking in campground and picnic reservations, conducting interpretive and public education programs, responding to medical emergencies and accidents to provide medical aid, performing search and rescue activities, fighting wildland fires within County Parks, managing volunteer events, performing resource management work in the areas of habitat conservation & restoration, and performing maintenance work. Park Rangers patrol the parks by truck, foot, boat, bike, and motorcycle. County Park Rangers also serve as boating safety officers and investigate vessel accidents and boating under the influence (BUI) violations on County reservoirs.

=== Junior Ranger program ===
Since 1998 the Park Rangers have offered an after school "Junior Ranger program" for children ages 9–11. Jr. Rangers meet in four two-hour sessions and learn about Park Ranger duties, wildlife, habitats, and the Ohlone Native American culture. At the end of the program students are invited to overnight campout with Park staff. Graduates of the program age 12 through 17 may move on to the Jr. Ranger II Program.

== Interpretive facilities ==
Santa Clara County Parks operates a number of interpretive facilities. The Almaden Quicksilver Mining Museum at Casa Grande showcases the history of the mercury (quicksilver) mining operations that occurred during the Gold Rush in the area of what is now Almaden Quicksilver County Park, Casa Grande being the former home of the mine superintendents. Chitactac-Adams Heritage Park offers a unique view into the Native American culture of Santa Clara County before and after the arrival of the Spanish, and includes a self-guided interpretive walk and a replica of a tule hut used by the Ohlone Indians. The Bernal-Joice-Gulnac Ranch at Santa Teresa County Park is a former home of the owners of the Rancho Santa Teresa land grant, operated by the Bernal family from 1834 until its acquisition by Santa Clara County in 1980.

== In the news ==
Santa Clara County bought 490 acres for $4 million to expand Mt. Madonna County Park.

Restored Casa Grande landmark reopens at Santa Clara County Park, November, 2010.

14 miles of new trails coming to Santa Clara County park.

Silicon Valley holdout: 287-acre farm in the heart of sprawl on the way to becoming public park.

Gilroy Dispatch: County to explore takeover of Coe Park
