= Hellyer Park Velodrome =

Velodrome in San Jose, California

Coordinates: 37.28809°N 121.81339°W

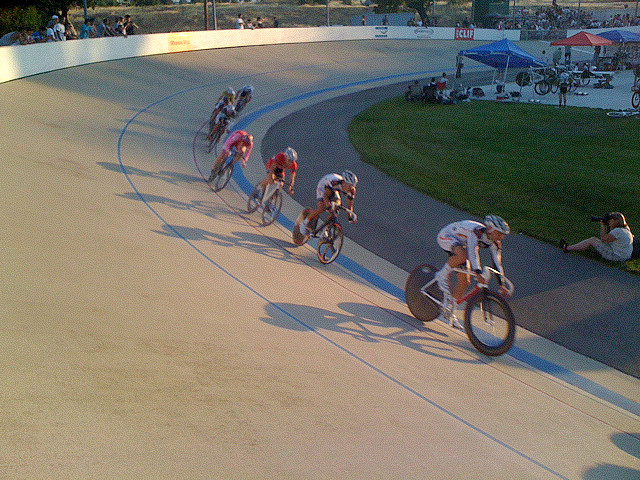
Bikers racing in July 2009

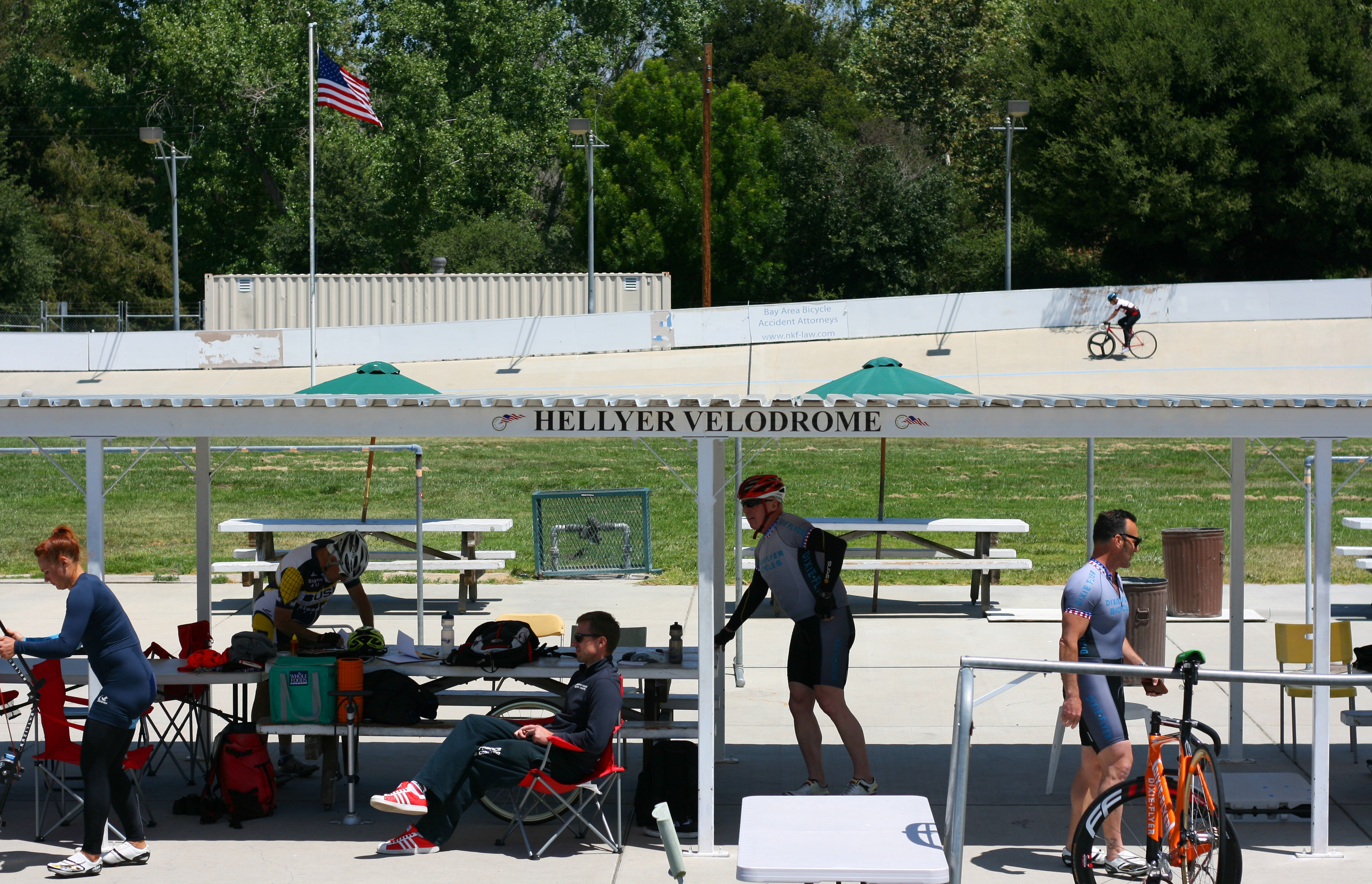
Pit stop at Hellyer Velodrome

Hellyer Park Velodrome is a velodrome in Hellyer County Park at San Jose, California, United States. It is a 335 metres (1,099 ft) track with turns at a maximum banking of 23 degrees built in 1963. It is located next to the Coyote Creek Trail and considered part of the county's Coyote Creek Parkway chain of parks along the creek.

In 1972, the Hellyer Velodrome hosted the US Olympic Bicycling Trials.

The velodrome is operated by the Northern California Velodrome Association (NCVA), a 501(c)3 non-profit corporation.

== See also ==
- Cycling in San Jose, California
- List of cycling tracks and velodromes
