= Hellyer County Park =

Park in San Jose, California

Coordinates: 37.2835°N 121.8121°W

Hellyer County Park is one of 28 Santa Clara County Parks. The park is located just off of Highway 101 in San Jose, California, United States. The 178-acre (72 ha) park is home to Hellyer Park Velodrome and Cottonwood Lake. Other recreational opportunities at the park include picnicking, hiking, fishing, biking, and a playground. Coyote Creek Parkway is a multi-use trail that is paved for 15 miles (24 km) south to Anderson Lake County Park. Coyote Creek Parkway is a jurisdiction of the Santa Clara County Parks. Coyote Creek Trail continues to the north along Coyote Creek under the jurisdiction of San Jose city parks.

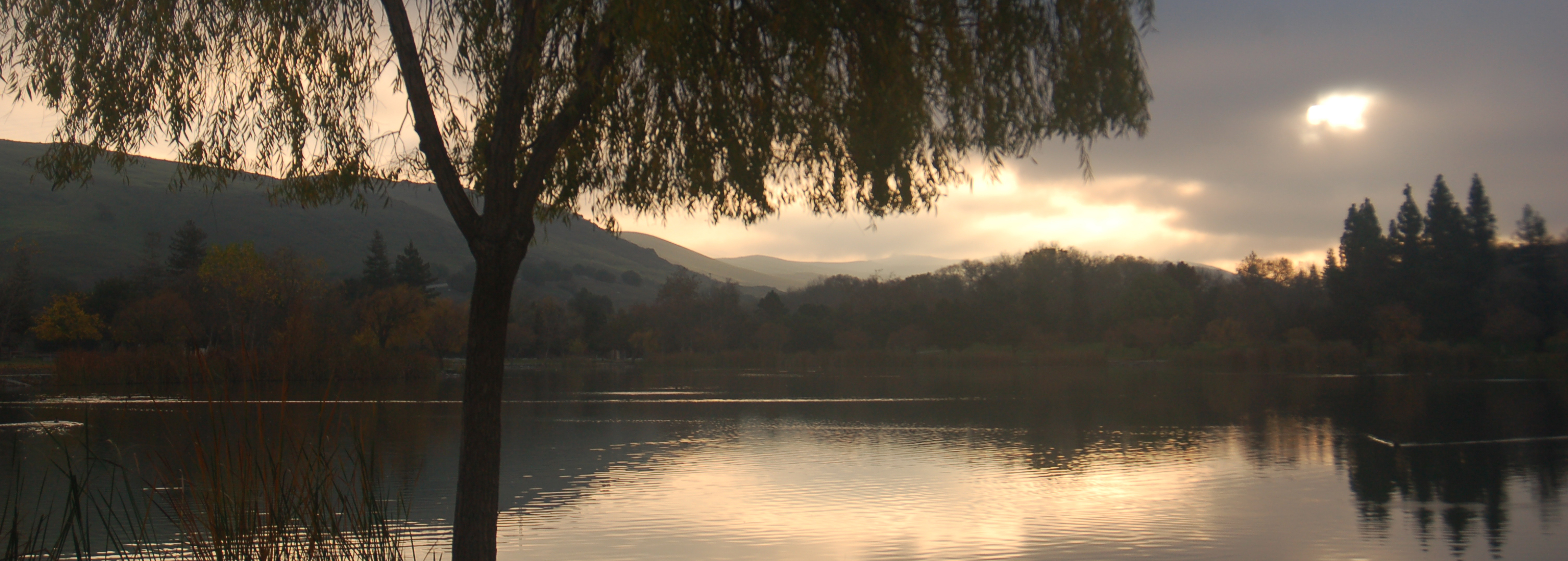
Hellyer County Park in December 2012
