= Vasona Lake County Park =

Park in Los Gatos, California, United States

- The Alvernaz Family; Vasona Lake Park
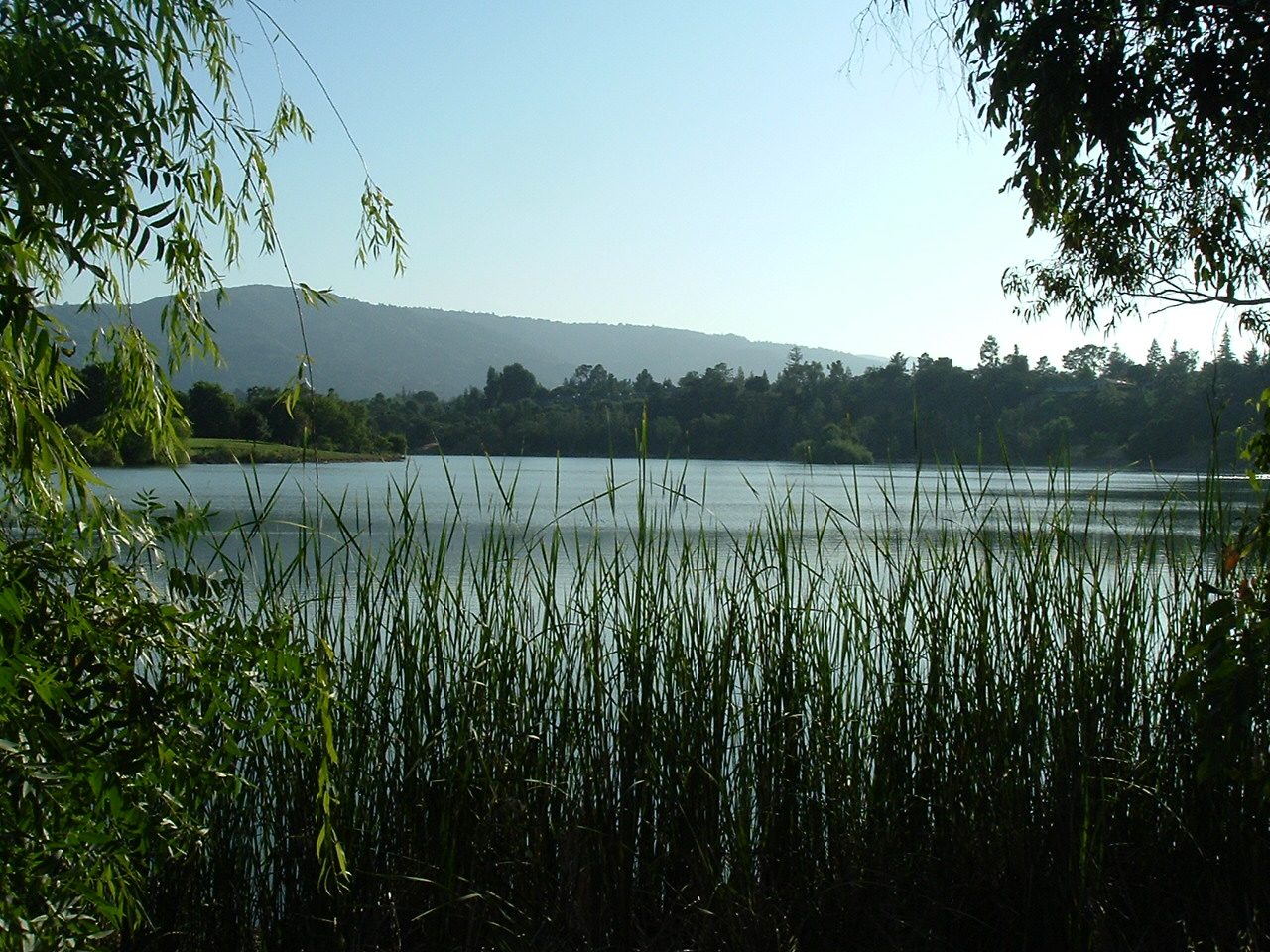
- Vasona Park Lake

- Location within California Location within the United States
- Location: Los Gatos, California
- Coordinates: 37°14′24″N 121°58′07″W
- Website: Vasona Lake County Park

Vasona Lake County Park is a park located in Los Gatos, California and part of the Santa Clara County Parks system. Vasona Park surrounds the Vasona Reservoir. Adjacent to the park are the Billy Jones Wildcat Railroad, a ridable miniature railway, and the W.E. "Bill" Mason Carousel, both at the Oak Meadow Park.

== History ==
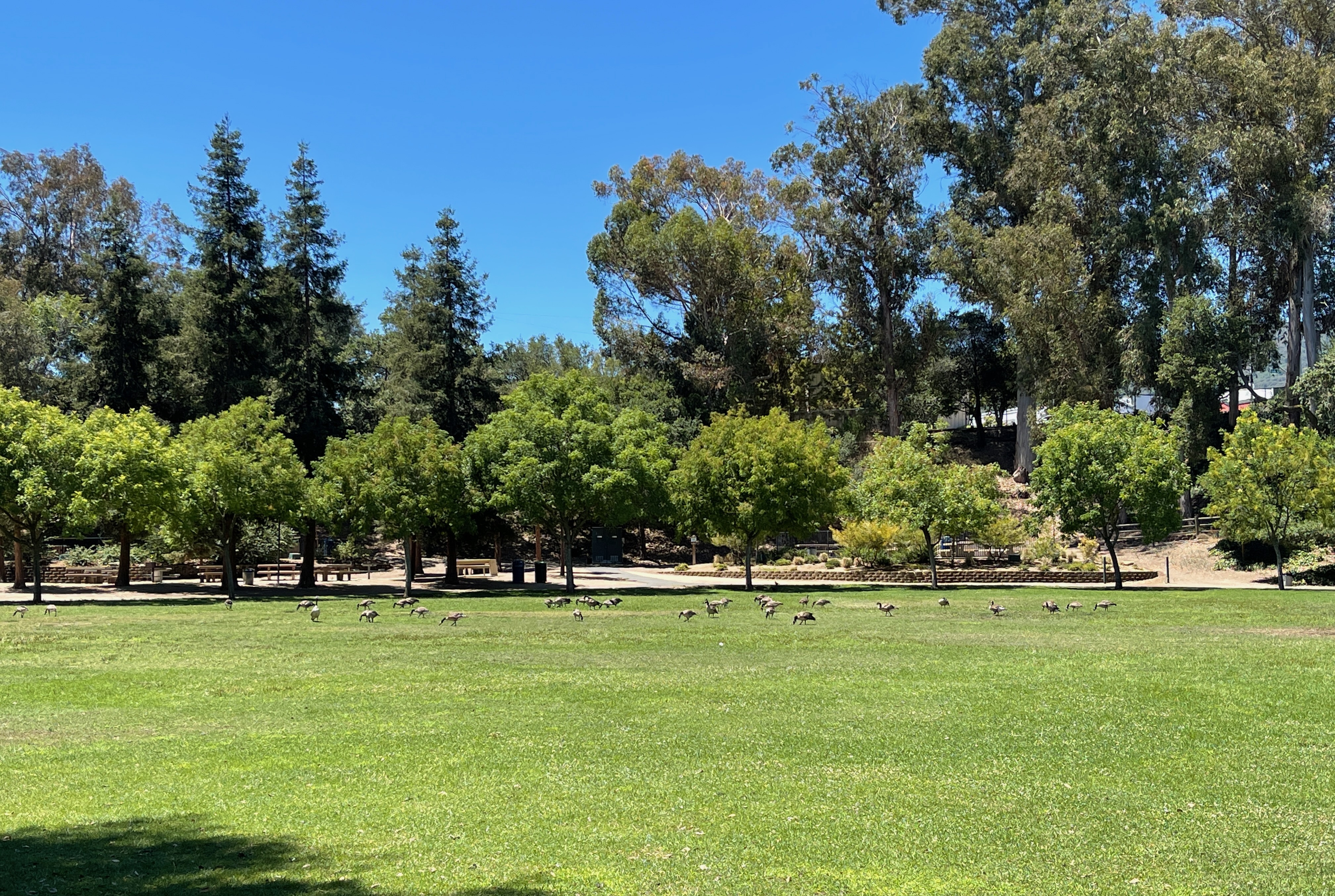
Vasona Lake County Park meadow with geese.

The land within the park's boundaries is among the most historic in Los Gatos. The grantees of the Rancho Rinconada de Los Gatos, Jose Hernandez and Sebastian Peralta, constructed an adobe house on what is now one of the park's lawns. It was the first structure built in the area.

The 3 ft (914 mm) narrow gauge South Pacific Coast Railroad once traversed the western edge of the park en route to downtown and over the Santa Cruz Mountains to Felton and Monterey Bay at Santa Cruz Wharf. The Southern Pacific Railroad later acquired the South Pacific Coast Railroad and converted the line to standard gauge after the turn of the century. A farmer near Pollard Road, Albert August Vollmer, contacted the Southern Pacific asking for a flag stop to be established to allow a more convenient place to board the train. The railroad not only agreed but allowed him to name the stop. He chose the name "Vasona", which was the name of his favorite pony during his childhood. "Vasona Junction" was the point on the line where the tracks split off from the San Jose-Campbell-Los Gatos mainline with the Vasona Branch through the Cupertino Hills to Palo Alto, allowing more direct travel to San Francisco. The name "Vasona" has reappeared locally ever since, including in the naming of the park. The dam was completed in 1934, and the railroad continued to run along the Western side of the reservoir until 1959. The railroad right-of-way over the reservoir is now University Avenue.

=== Other owners of property ===
Owners of property have been the Alvernaz Family, Vasona Lake Park, dairy farming through the Great Depression era. José Alvernaz started Sun Ray Dairy in Los Gatos in 1933 and was a well-respected member of his community.

=== Years: 1903 — 1993 ===
José Pereira Alvernaz, who was born in 1903, on Faial Island, Azores, arrived in Providence, Rhode Island in 1916 at age 13. After a week with relatives, he set out for California. After working at various jobs, including working at the University of Santa Clara, he was able to buy a dairy in 1933 that became known as Sun Ray Dairy in Los Gatos. The dairy was in what is now Vasona Lake Park, which includes a man-made lake. The house in which José lived was located on the hill near what is now Hwy 17. The house has been torn down to make way for a new visitors’ center.

Sun Ray Dairy was very successful and grew. José sold his milk, and those who did not have much money were allowed to pay him by bartering with eggs, vegetables, meat, or other products. He took very good care of his customers during those difficult years. One of his customers was Sarah Winchester.

When the stock market crashed and the banks were forced to close, José was doing well -- having $1,000 in the bank and money coming in daily. He was well-respected by the community for providing a great dairy for the town's residents. José was naturalized as an American citizen in 1930.

José was also a member of: The Lions Club, the Luso-American Fraternal Federation (Past President), and he attended Five Wounds Portuguese National Church. He assisted in the building of the church by delivering supplies, and his uncles helped by volunteering their labor. He was also a leading member of the Santa Clara Dairymen's Association. He was the first to purchase a pasteurizing machine for his dairy in Los Gatos.

== Mini Train and Carousel ==
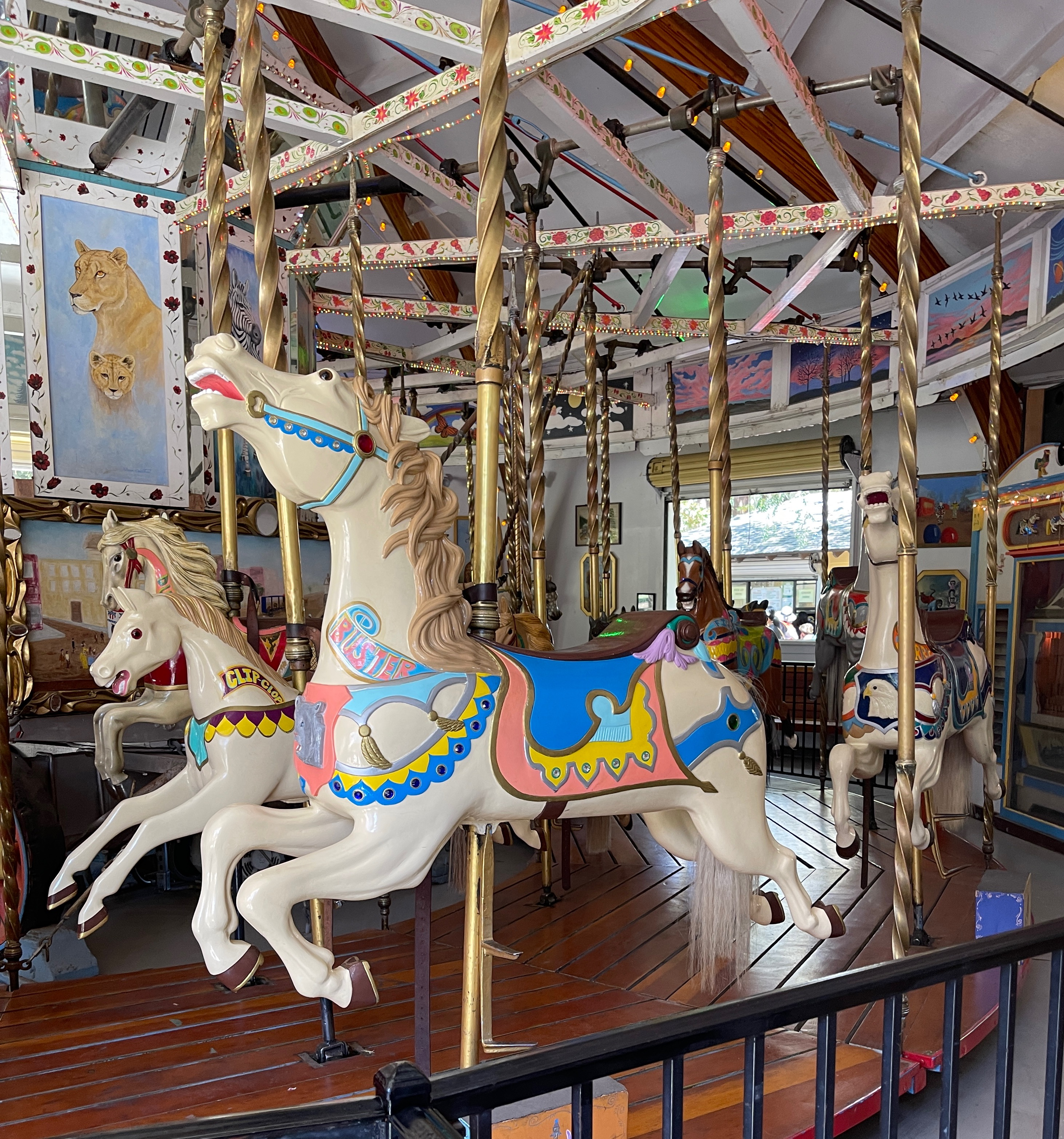
W.E. "Bill" Mason Carousel

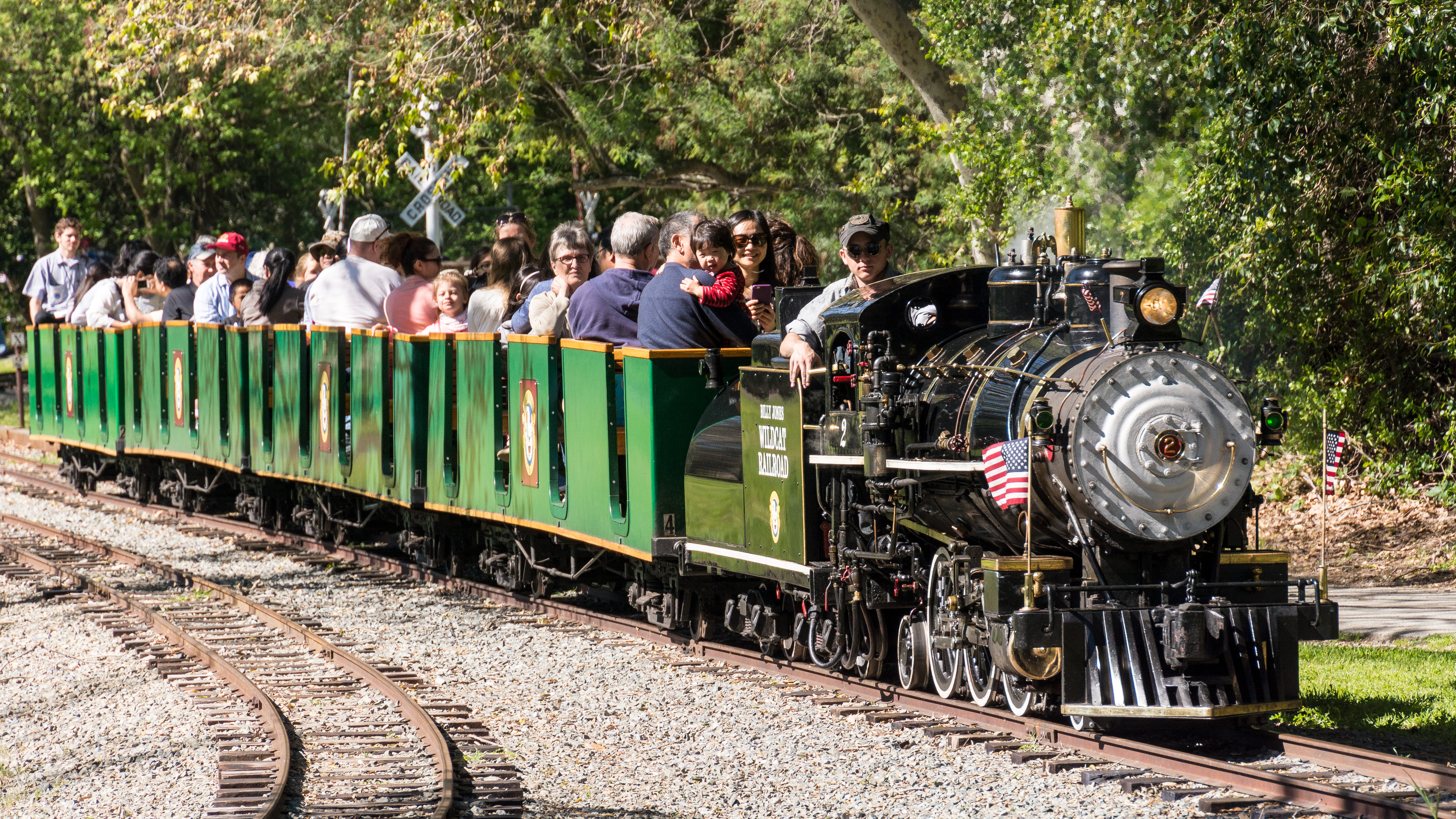
Billy Jones Railroad in Vasona Lake Park (2016)

After the death of Southern Pacific engineer Billy Jones in 1968, a volunteer-led movement secured part of the park's southern end for the reconstructed, 18 in (457 mm) gauge Billy Jones Wildcat Railroad (BJWRR), a miniature railway which Jones ran around his prune orchard on Winchester Boulevard and Daves Avenue. The depot and engine house, concessions and souvenir stand, and W.E. "Bill" Mason Carousel are all in Oak Meadow Park, a short walk from adjacent Vasona Park. The railroad operates weekends year-round as well as daily during school summer vacations. Steam locomotive No. 2, 100 years old in 2005, was once again made operable after being reboilered over the course of about a decade. The carousel building also houses a custom built band organ that plays from Wurlitzer 150 rolls. The organ was extensively rebuilt and upgraded to include a MIDI interface in 2012.

In 2013, the park's picnic areas were renovated.

== Location ==
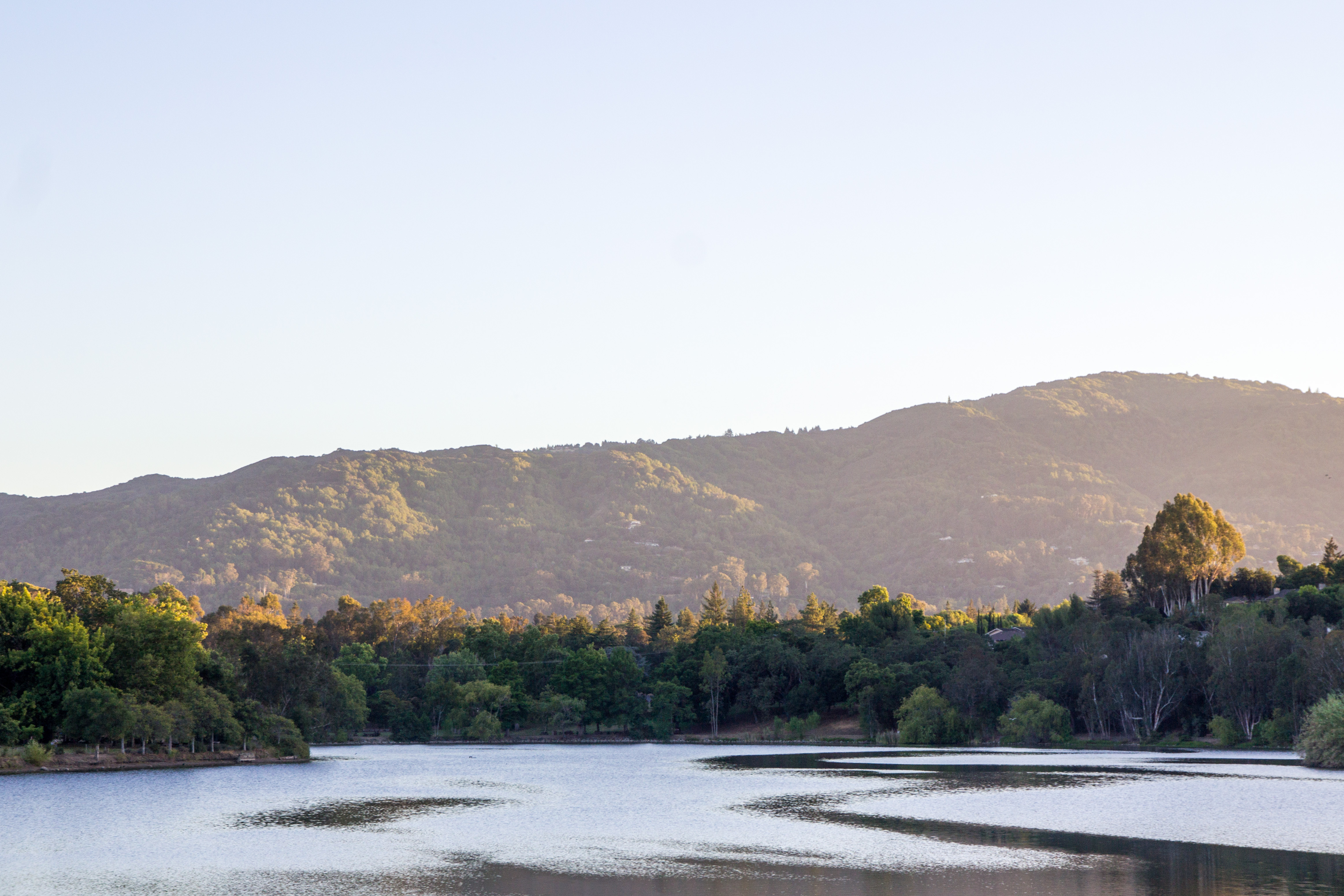
The Vasona Reservoir (2014)

Vasona Park surrounds Vasona Reservoir, which is along with the Lexington Reservoir located in Los Gatos's southern edge, was formed by damming Los Gatos Creek.

The adjacent Oak Meadow Park is owned by the Town of Los Gatos.

== Animal life ==
A bald eagle was spotted in the Vasona Lake County Park in early 2017.

== Public activities ==
The reservoir is host to non-power recreational boating, and a marina on site has pedal boats for public rental. Other popular water sports in the reservoir include kayaking and standup paddleboarding. Watercraft from outside the park or swimming is not allowed. The park is also home to the Youth Science Institute, several picnic pavilions, and several hiking/biking trails. The popular Los Gatos Creek Trail, which runs from Lexington Dam to western downtown San Jose in two segments, passes through the park. It is one of the most popular parks in the south bay.

Since 1999, the Park organizes the annual event Vasona Fantasy of Lights. During the month of December, the park is filled with light-powered holiday scenes, imageries, and animations which illuminate the park. The park also co-hosts the annual Pianos in the Park event organized by the Santa Clara County Parks.

== Vasona Science and Nature Center ==
Opened in 1980, the Youth Science Institute - Vasona Science and Nature Center is a youth science and nature education facility operated by the Youth Science Institute. The center features natural history exhibits, live animals found in the Guadalupe Watershed region and a native plant trail. The center offers nature and science school and group programs, after-school science and summer camp programs.

The Vasona center is the administrative headquarters for the Youth Science Institute.
