= Coyote Creek Trail =

Cycling and pedestrian trail in San Jose and Santa Clara County, California

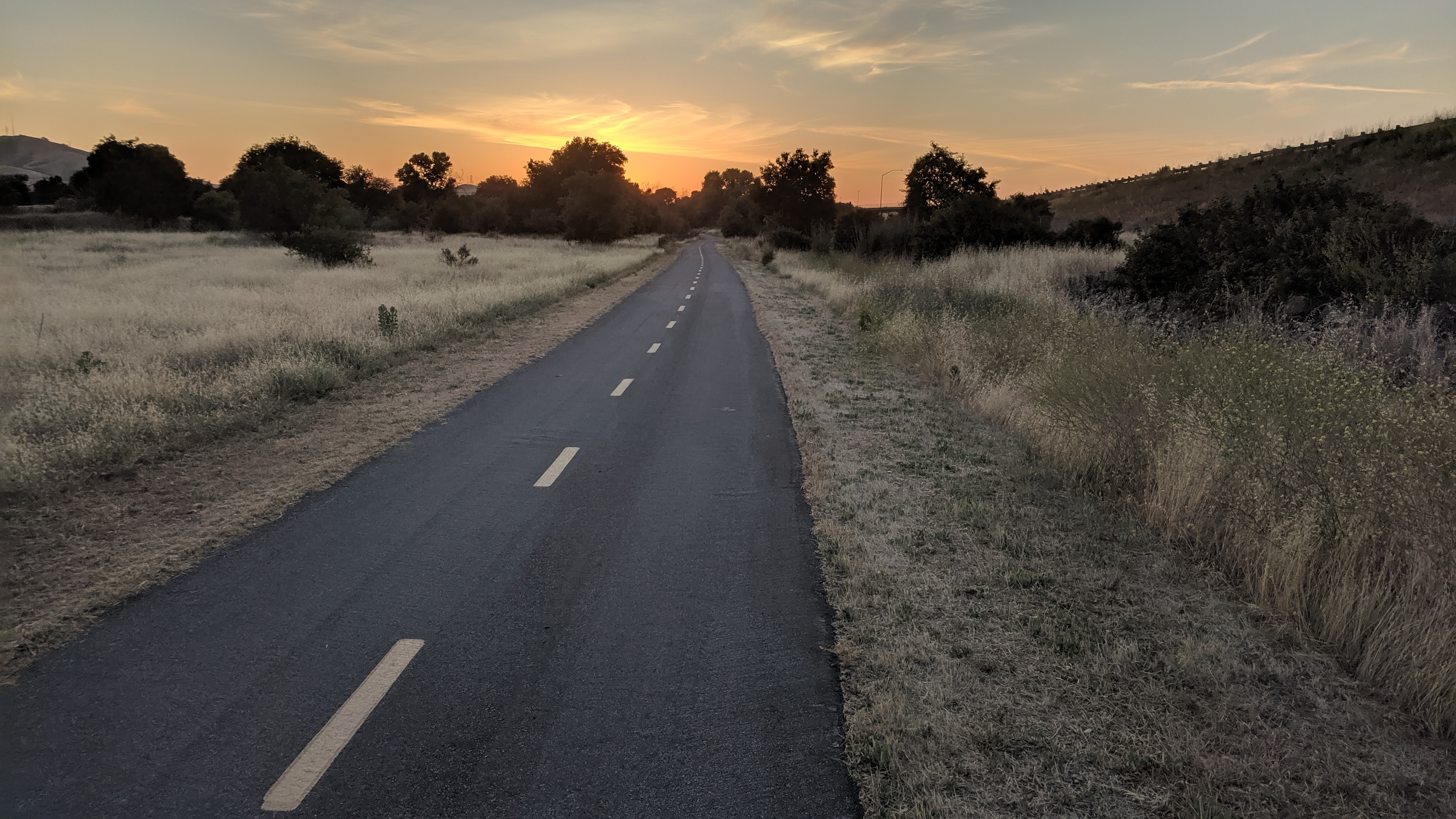
- Coyote Creek Trail near Bailey at sunset
- Length: 18.7 miles (30.1 km)
- Location: Santa Clara County, California
- Designation: National Recreation Trail
- Surface: paved

The Coyote Creek Trail is a pedestrian and cycling trail along Coyote Creek in San Jose, California, which continues into Coyote Valley and northern Morgan Hill. The Coyote Creek Trail was designated part of the National Recreation Trail system in 2009. It is also part of the Bay Area Ridge Trail system.

== Coyote Creek Trail in San Jose ==
National Recreation Trail

The northern portion of the trail is in the San Jose city limits. The northernmost point is at the southern tip of San Francisco Bay. The trail is not yet continuous within San Jose. A paved section exists between the Highway 237 Bikeway and Tasman Drive. A short disconnected segment is at Berryessa Road at the San Jose Flea Market and Berryessa BART Station. The trail is paved from Tully Road south for 2 miles to the end of the city-maintained segment at Hellyer County Park, where the paved county section continues.

Ecological artist Deborah Kennedy was commissioned by the San Jose Public Art Program to work alongside sculptor Diana Pumpelly Bates in 2004 on completion of a community project for the Coyote Creek Trail. Their public artworks, including Kennedy's 'Ripple Effect' and Bates 'Run River Run', are used to promote public awareness of a concrete landing pad and ramp leading to a levee where strollers, wheelchairs, and bicyclists have greater accessibility to the site.

== Coyote Creek Parkway ==
The southern county-maintained portion of the Coyote Creek Trail is part of the Coyote Creek Parkway, which includes the trail and a chain of county parks along the creek. The county portion is 15 miles of paved trail from Hellyer Park to Anderson Lake.

== Landmarks ==
- City of San Jose
  - North San Jose segment (1.0 mile (1.6 km))
    - Highway 237 Bikeway
    - VTA light rail Cisco Way station
  - Berryessa District segment (.25 miles (0.40 km))
    - San Jose Flea Market
    - Berryessa BART Station
  - South San Jose segment (2.5 miles (4.0 km)) - contiguous with county portion of trail
    - connects to Hellyer County Park
- Santa Clara County (15 miles (24 km))
  - Hellyer County Park
  - Hellyer Park Velodrome
  - Coyote, California
  - Santa Clara County Model Aircraft Skypark
  - Anderson Lake County Park

== Gallery ==
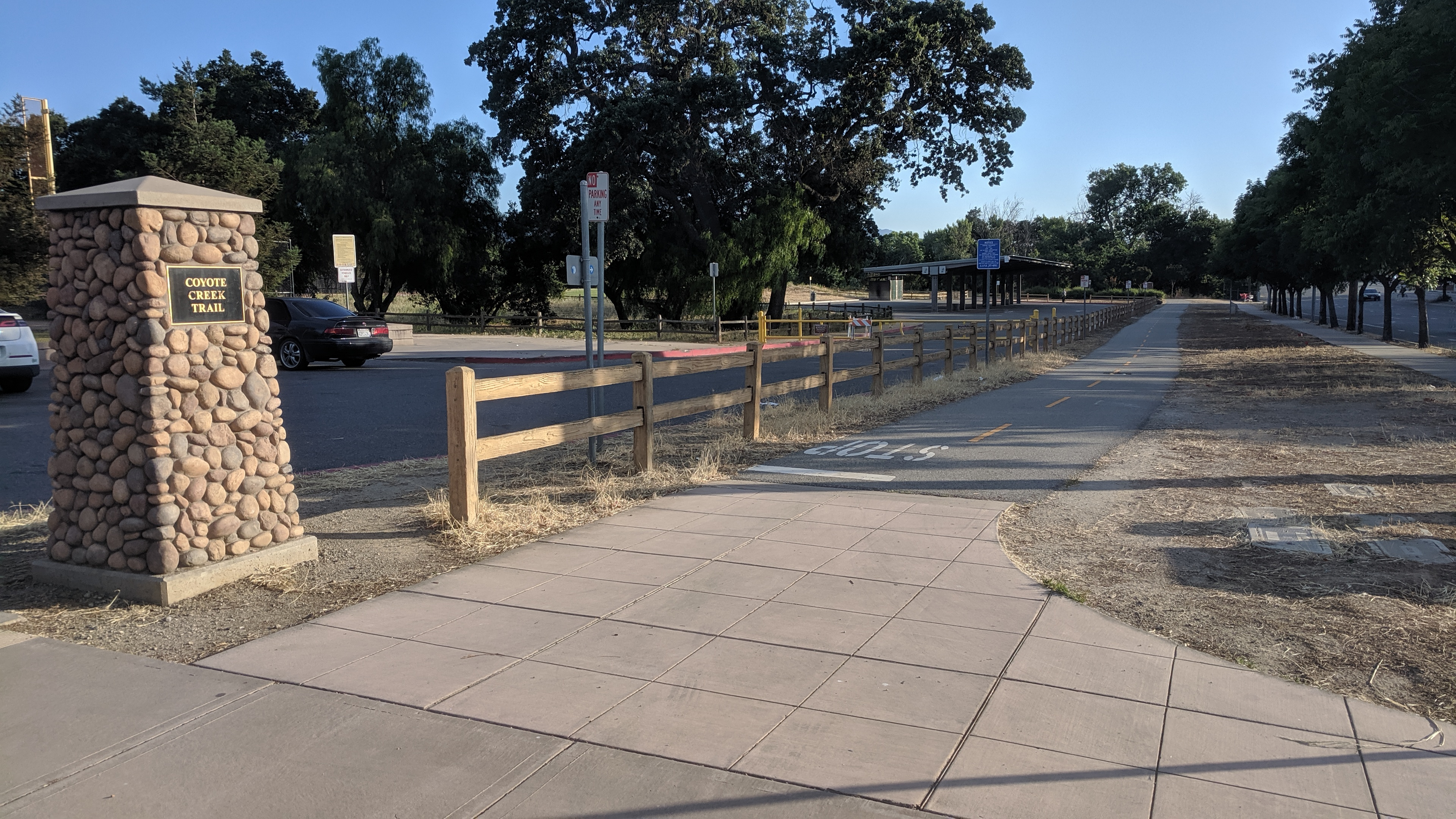
Tully Road trailhead of the Coyote Creek Trail in San Jose

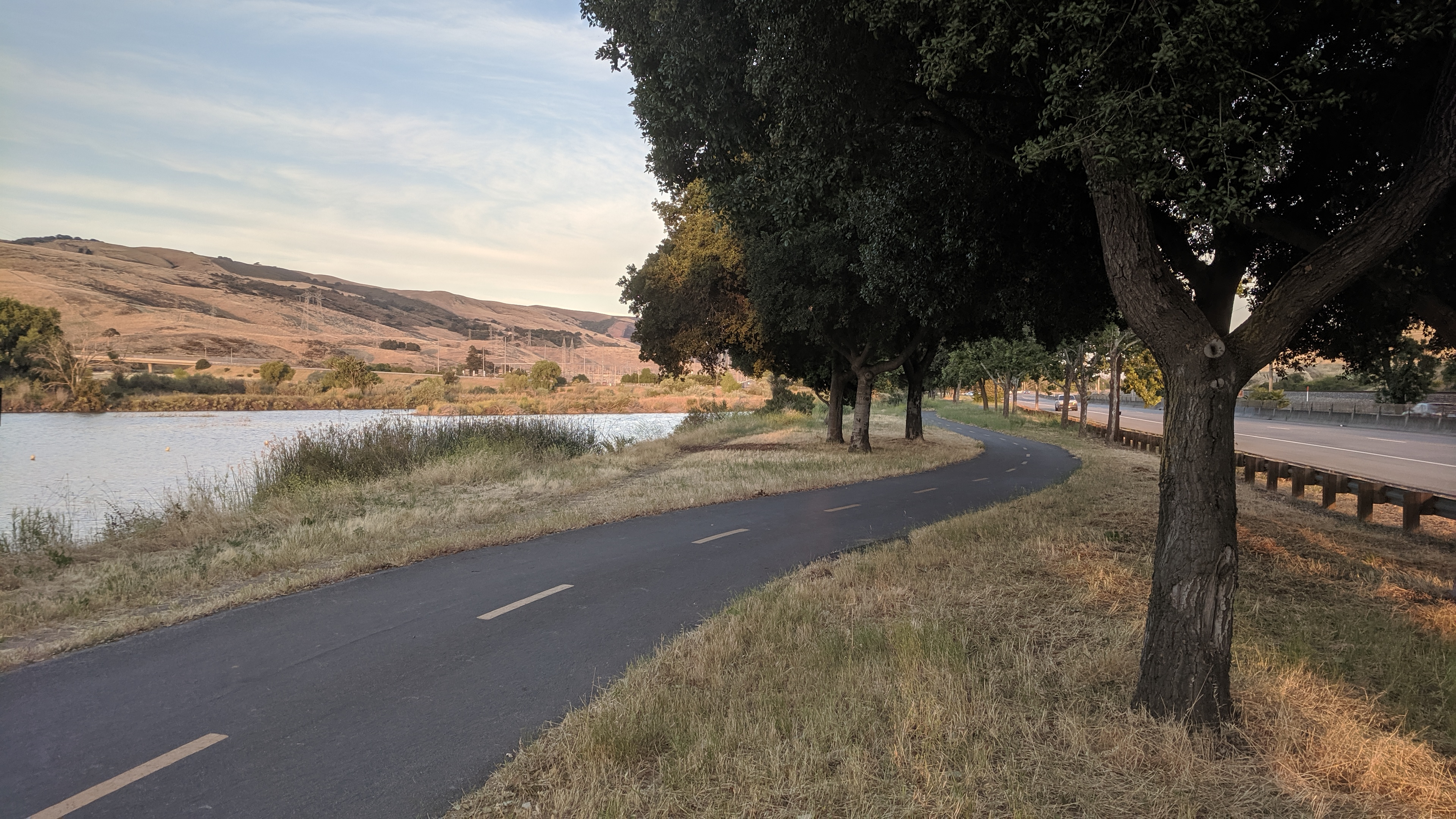
Coyote Creek Trail at Coyote Creek Lake

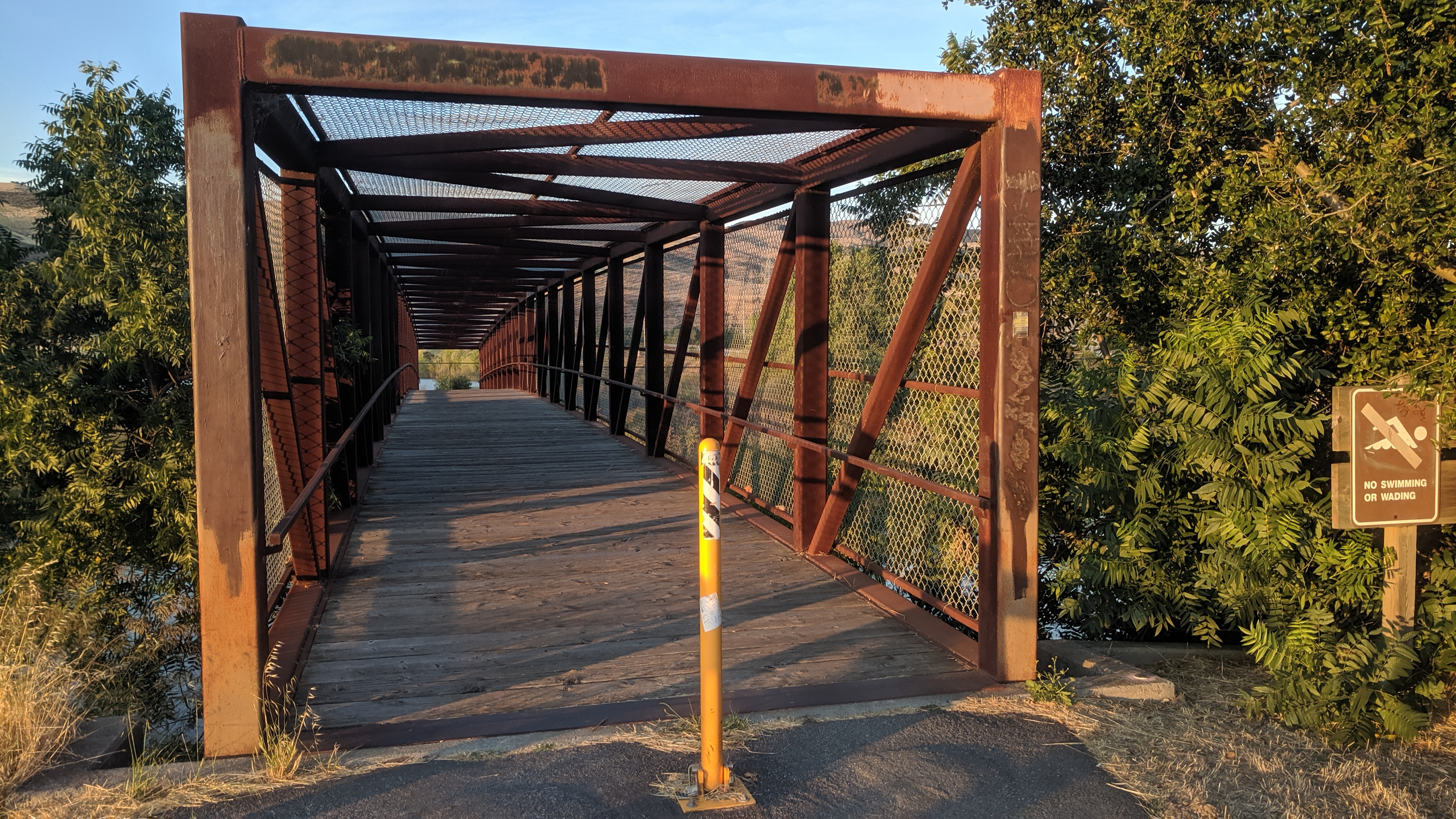
Bridge over Coyote Creek on the Coyote Creek Trail

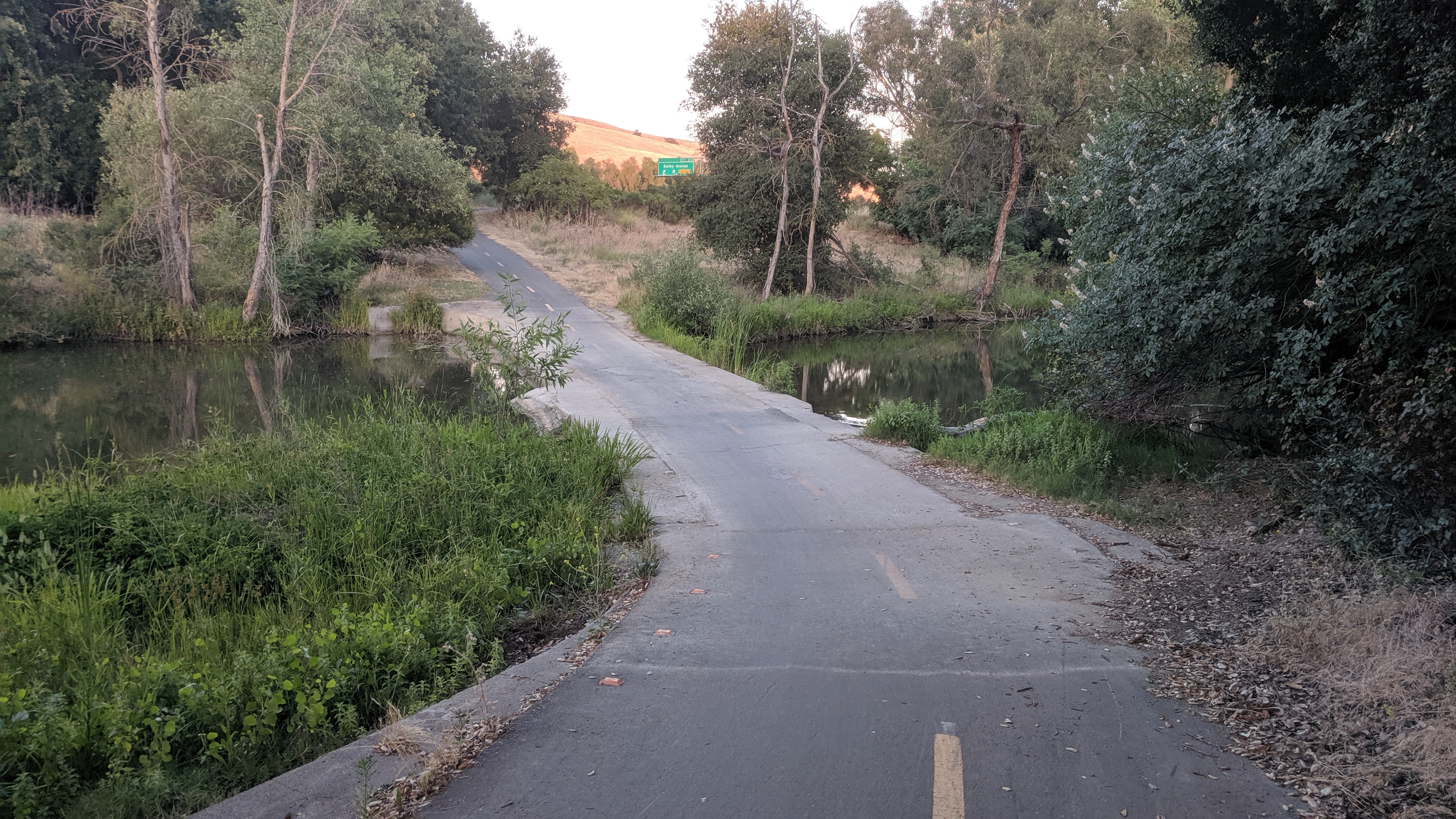
Coyote Creek Trail crosses the creek near Bailey Avenue
