= Anderson Lake (California) =

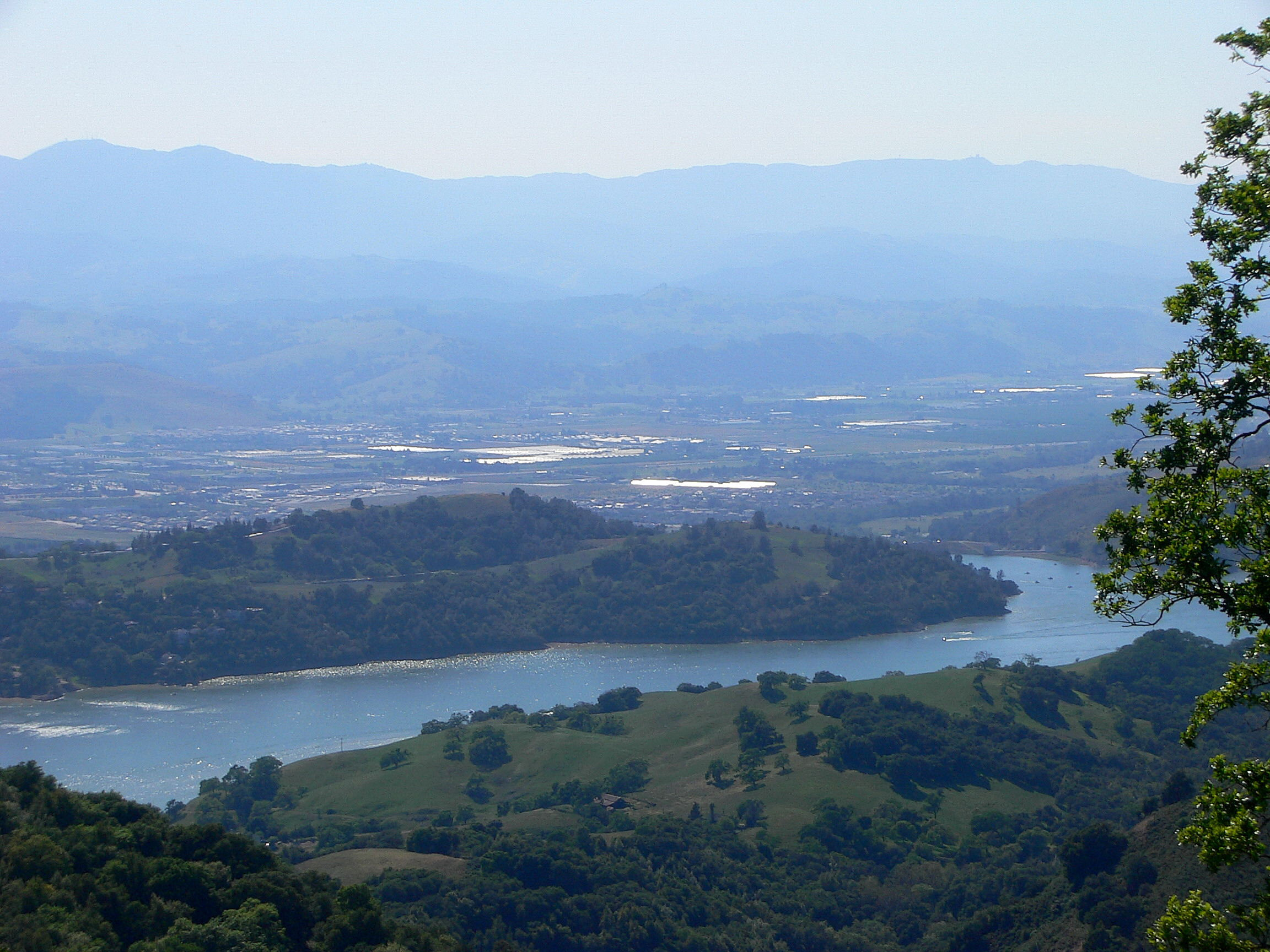
- April 2008

- Location within California
- Location: Santa Clara County, California
- Coordinates: 37°10′17″N 121°37′10″W
- Type: Reservoir
- Primary inflows: Coyote Creek
- Primary outflows: Coyote Creek
- Catchment area: 194.4 sq mi (503 km^{2})
- Basin countries: United States
- Managing agency: Santa Clara Valley Water District
- Max. length: 41,184 ft (12,553 m)
- Max. width: 3,840 ft (1,170 m)
- Surface area: 1,271 acres (5.14 km^{2})
- Water volume: 91,300 acre-feet (0.1126 km^{3})
- Surface elevation: 627 feet (191 m)

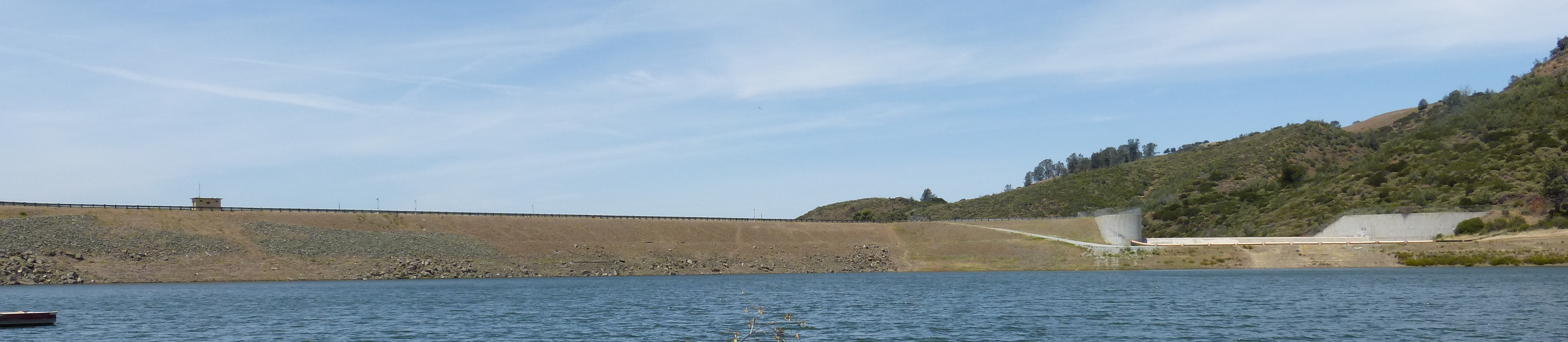
Anderson Dam with the spillway visible to the right.

Anderson Lake, also known as Anderson Reservoir, is an artificial lake in Morgan Hill, located in southern Santa Clara County, California. The reservoir is formed by the damming of Coyote Creek just below its confluence with Las Animas Creek. A 4,275-acre (1,730 ha) county park surrounds the reservoir.

== History ==
The reservoir was created in 1950 (76 years ago) by the construction of the Anderson Dam across Coyote Creek in the foothills of the Diablo Mountains east of Morgan Hill. The reservoir and dam were named after Leroy Anderson, a key founder and first president of the Santa Clara Valley Water District (not to be confused with the music composer of the same name). It is the largest reservoir owned by the district.

=== Risk of dam failure ===
In January 2009 a preliminary routine seismic study suggested a small chance that a large-magnitude earthquake (6.6 with the dam at the epicenter, or 7.2 up to a mile away) could result in flooding in Morgan Hill and as far away as San Jose. In response, the Santa Clara Valley Water District (SCVWD) lowered the water level to 74 percent of capacity and announced a further analysis of the situation, which could possibly result in retrofitting the dam if necessary. Updated findings in October 2010 indicated that the dam could fail if a magnitude 7.25 earthquake occurred within 2 kilometres (1.2 mi) of the dam, potentially releasing a wall of water 35 feet (11 m) high into downtown Morgan Hill in 14 minutes, and 8 feet (2.4 m) deep into San Jose within three hours. In response SCVWD lowered the water to 54% full, which was 60 feet (18 m) feet below the dam crest.

In July 2011 SCVWD issued a report stating that the seismic stability study on Anderson Dam was completed. The storage restriction that had been in place since October 2010 was adjusted, allowing 12 additional feet of storage, which increased the holding capacity to 68 percent. The water district initiated a capital project for a seismic retrofit by the end of 2018. The operating restriction was to remain in place until the project was complete. Remediation of the problem was expected to cost as much as US$100 million.

In December 2016 SCVWD reported that further geotechnical analysis indicated that considerably more work would need to be performed on the dam, essentially removing it and rebuilding it. The existing dam had been built on alluvial deposits which could liquefy during an earthquake. Accordingly, the estimated cost rose to US$400 million and the start of work was rescheduled to 2020, with completion planned for 2023–2024.

After years of additional studies and interim actions, the Federal Energy Regulatory Commission dismissed the Water District's plans as insufficient to address the risk of catastrophic failure and in February 2020 ordered the lowering of the reservoir to deadpool storage, commencing no later than October 1. The letter noted that the district's "actions to date do not demonstrate an appropriate sense of urgency" regarding the risk of catastrophic failure in the case of an earthquake.

In 2020, the reservoir was drained to 3% of its capacity. This enables the water district to disassemble and rebuild the dam. It had the effect of increasing San Jose's reliance on imported water.

=== San Jose flooding ===
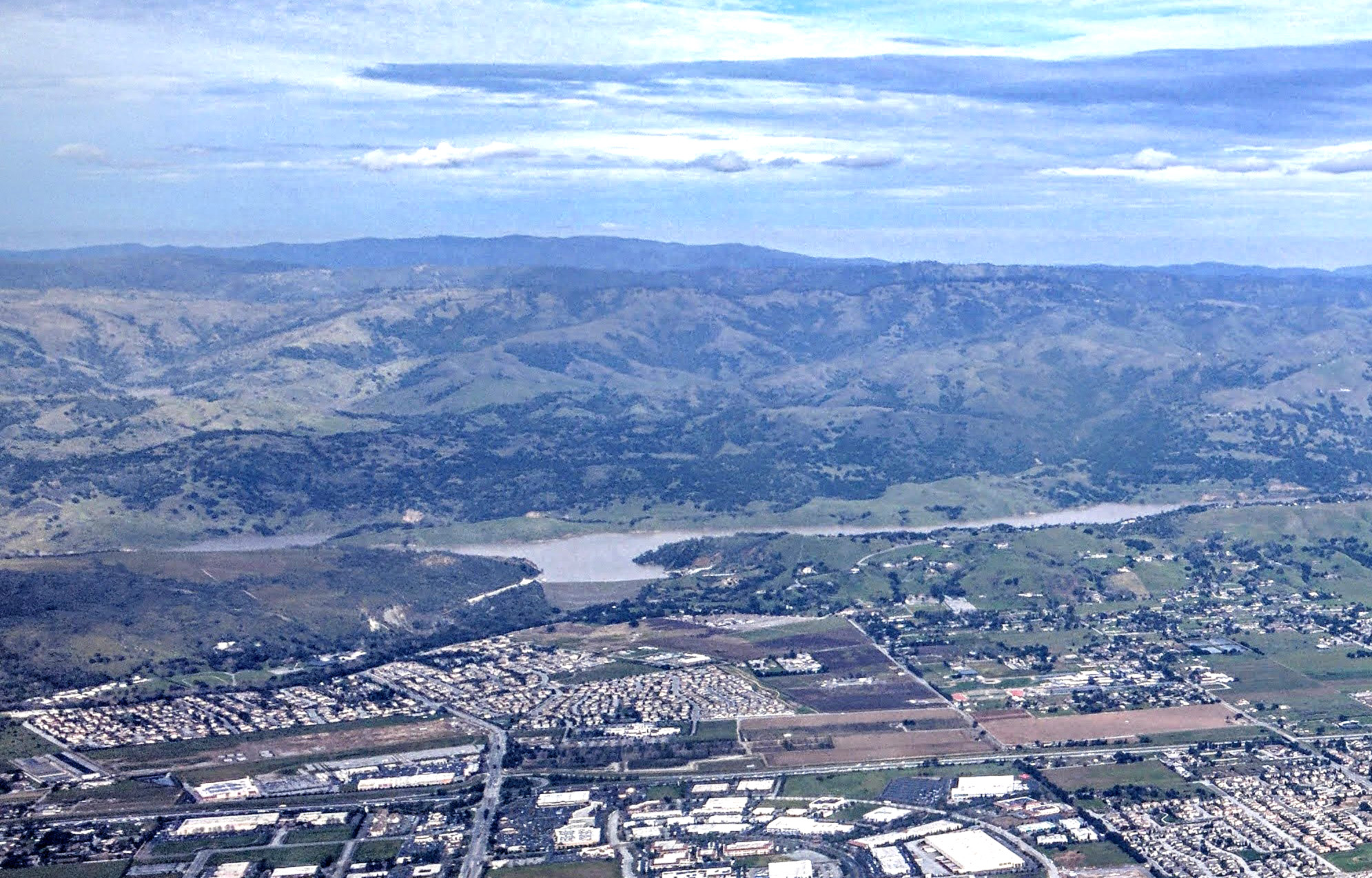
Anderson Reservoir, above Morgan Hill and San Jose, California, near capacity, two weeks after its overflow flooded neighborhoods in San Jose.

On February 21, 2017, during the 2017 California floods, the reservoir reached as high as 104% of capacity, creating a large flow over the spillway into Coyote Creek, which overflowed and flooded the Rock Springs/Summerside, Olinder, Naglee Park, Roosevelt, Wooster-Tripp and Berryessa neighborhoods of San Jose along US Highway 101 between the reservoir and the south San Francisco Bay.

== Anderson Dam ==
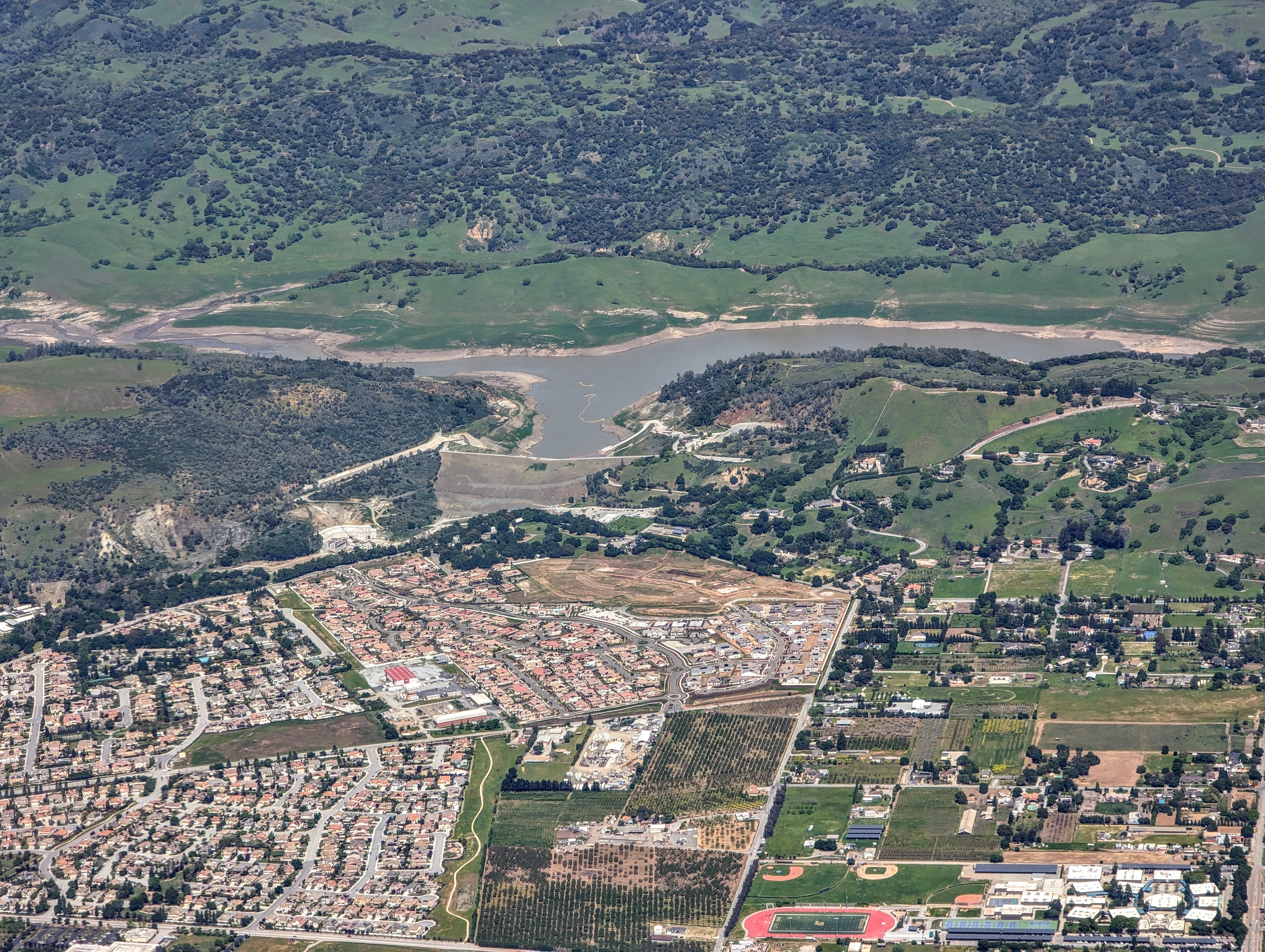
Anderson Dam with lake at low level in 2024

The 235-foot-high (72 m) earthen dam measures 1,430 feet (440 m) long by 900 feet (270 m) wide and sits along the Coyote Creek Fault on Coyote Road, east of Morgan Hill. The reservoir itself is situated parallel to the Calaveras Fault, which runs from Hollister to Milpitas. It holds over 90,000 acre-feet (110,000,000 m^{3}) of water when full, more than the other nine reservoirs in the county combined.

The California Office of Environmental Health Hazard Assessment has issued a safety advisory for any fish caught in Anderson Lake due to elevated levels of mercury and PCBs.

== Anderson Lake County Park ==
The 4,275-acre (1,730 ha) Anderson Lake County Park is managed by the Santa Clara County Parks and Recreation Department. In addition to the county's largest reservoir is the Coyote Creek Parkway multiple-use trails, the Jackson Ranch historic park site, the Moses L. Rosendin Park, the Burnett Park area, and Anderson Lake Visitors Center. Coyote Creek Parkway, a paved trail along Coyote Creek that heads 15 miles (24 km) north to Hellyer County Park, is used for hiking, jogging, bicycling, horseback riding, and skating.

The lake provides limited fishing ("catch and release"), picnicking, and hiking activities. Although swimming is prohibited, boating, water-skiing, and jet-skiing are permitted in the reservoir.

== See also ==
- List of lakes in California
- List of lakes in the San Francisco Bay Area
- List of dams and reservoirs in California
