= Seal of California =

U.S. state seal

The Great Seal of the State of California
- The Great Seal of the State of California, adopted by the state constitutional convention in 1849
- Armiger: State of California
- Adopted: 1849 (followed by minor changes in 1883, 1891, and 1937)
- Motto: Eureka

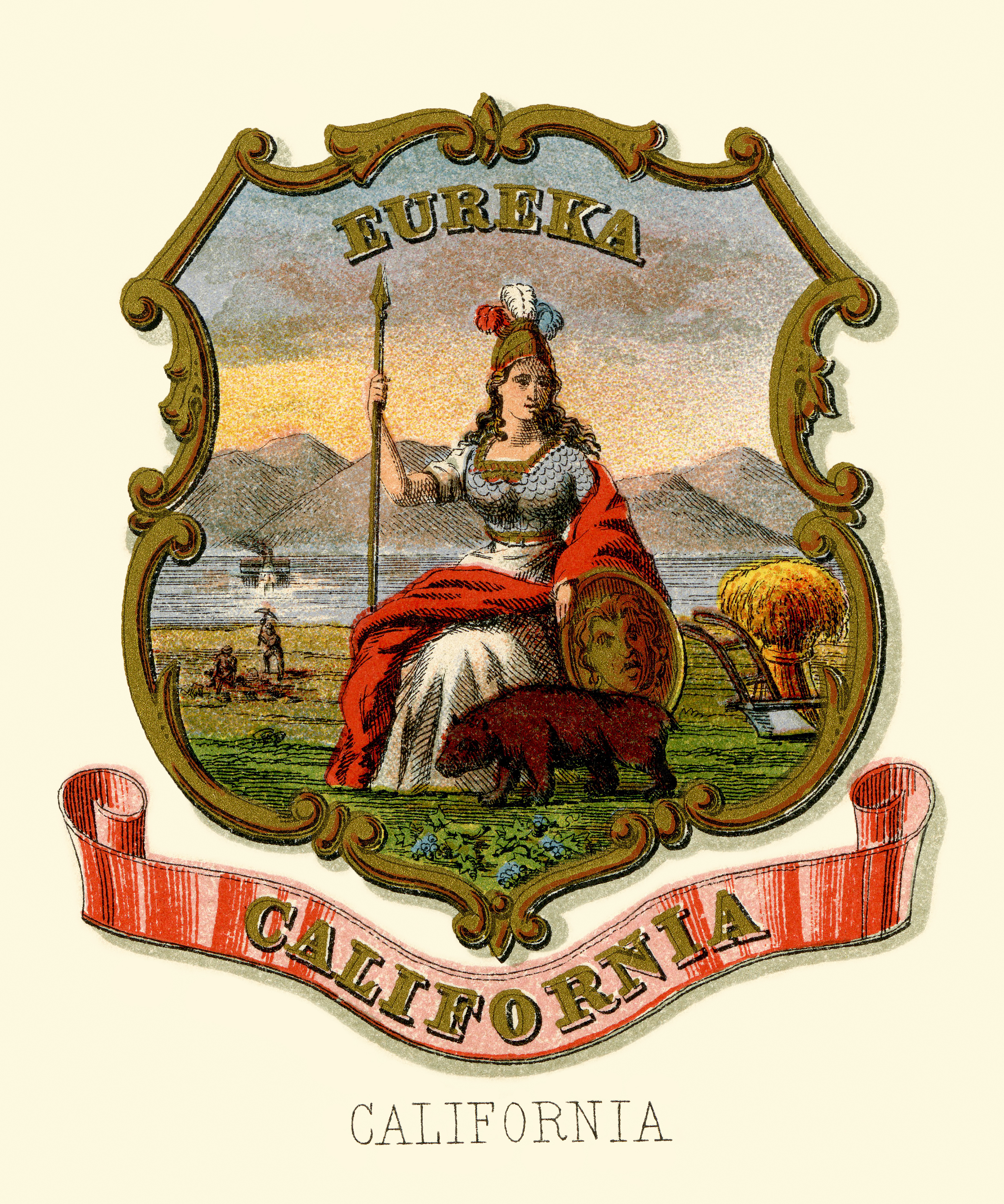
California historical coat of arms (illustrated, 1876)

The Great Seal of the State of California was adopted at the California state Constitutional Convention of 1849 and has undergone minor design changes since then, the last being the standardization of the seal in 1937. The seal shows Athena in Greek mythology (alternately Minerva in Roman mythology), the goddess of wisdom and war, because she was born an adult, and California was never a territory; a California grizzly bear, the official state animal, feeding on grape vines, representing California's wine production; a sheaf of grain, representing agriculture; a miner, representing the California Gold Rush and the mining industry; and sailing ships, representing the state's economic power. The word Eureka (εύρηκα in Greek), meaning "I have found it", is the California state motto.

The original design of the seal was by U.S. Army major Robert S. Garnett and engraved by Albert Kuner. However, because of the friction then in existence between the military and civil authorities, Garnett was unwilling to introduce the design to the constitutional convention, so convention clerk Caleb Lyon introduced it as his own design, with Garnett's approval. Garnett later became the first general to be killed in the Civil War, where he served as a Confederate.

== Overview ==
The Great Seal, or the Great Seal of the State of California as it is officially called, is the impression made on "all commissions, pardons and other public instruments to which the signature of the Governor is required" with the attestation of the Secretary of State; the impression, with or without "wafer," is made by a master die and counter die of an officially adopted design fixed in a seal press capable of exerting great pressure upon the document placed between the two parts of the die; it is also the impression made by the Secretary of State on papers certified over his signature. For the Governor's papers the Great Seal serves the same purpose as a notarial seal on civil documents. This impression is the Great Seal. There have been many redesigns and reproductions of this seal – they are not the Great Seal but only reproductions of it in many forms, sizes and even colors.... There has been and is only one Great Seal, there have been many redesigns and reproductions of the seal – but there is only one Great Seal. There have been four designs and four master dies [1849, 1883, 1891, and 1937], all basically the same with variations in some minor details and in detail relations.

— J. N. Bowman (Historian, Central Record Depository), "The Great Seal of California", California Blue Book (Sacramento: State Printing Office, 1950), 162, 170

=== Legal definition ===
The legal definition of the Great Seal of the State of California is found in the California Government Code, Sections 399–405.

=== Original 1849 description ===
1849 illustration of the Seal of California that accompanied Bayard Taylor's description

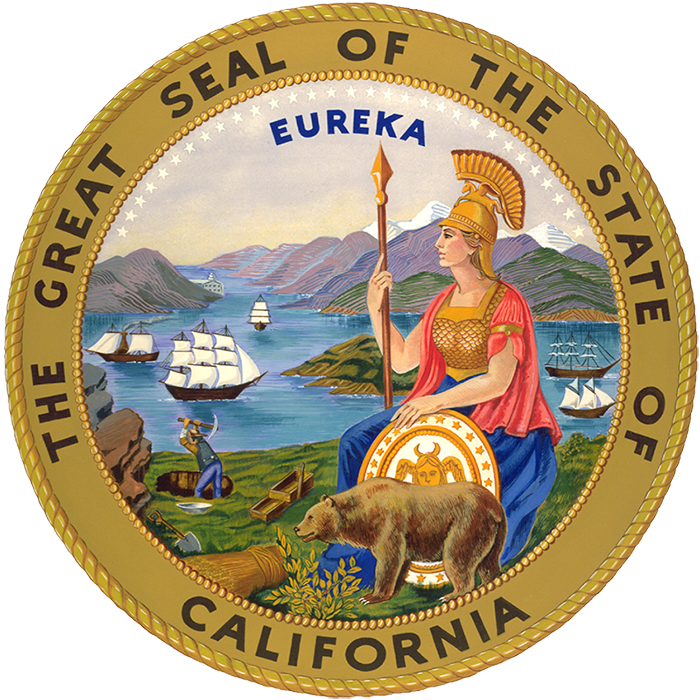
Modern day full-color illustration of the Seal of California

Around the bevel of the ring are represented thirty-one stars, being the number of the States of which the Union will consist, upon the admission of California. The foreground figure represents the goddess Minerva [Greek: Athena], having sprung full-grown from the brain of Jupiter [Greek: Zeus]. She is introduced as a type of the political birth of the State of California, without having gone through the probation of a Territory. At her feet crouches a grisly [grizzly] bear, feeding upon clusters from a grape vine, which, with the sheaf of wheat, are emblematic of the peculiar characteristics of the country. A miner is engaged at work, with a rocker and bowl at his side, illustrating the golden wealth of the Sacramento, upon whose waters are seen shipping, typical of commercial greatness; and the snow-clad peaks of the Sierra Nevada make up the back-ground. Above, is the Greek motto "Eureka," (I have found it,) applying either to the principle involved in the admission of the State, or the success of the miners at work.

— Bayard Taylor, "Bayard Taylor's Letters, No. XXVII – The Great Seal of the State of California", New York Weekly Tribune, 22 December 1849, 1

=== The geography of the Seal ===
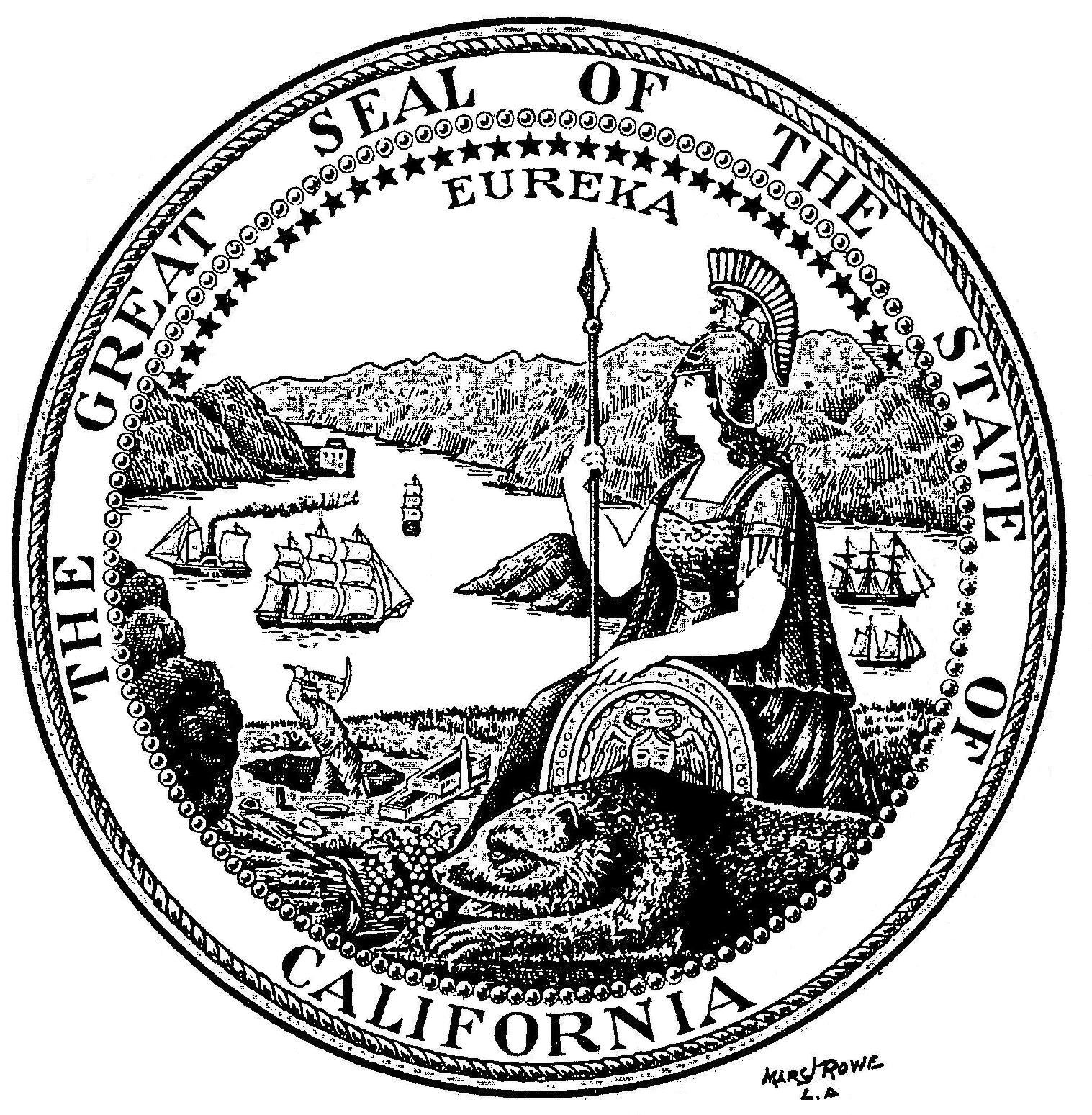
Marc J. Rowe's interpretation of the Seal of California

Although the waters were described in 1849 as being "of the Sacramento" and the mountains in the background as being "the snow-clad peaks of the Sierra Nevada", other, very early descriptions referred to the body of water as San Francisco Bay. In a letter to Lyon dated two days before the seal was approved by the convention, Garnett described the landscape as a "view of the Bay of San Francisco and its vessels", and in 1899, Garnett's brother referred to the mountain as Mount Diablo, supports Robert's view, if Minerva is placed in San Francisco and 'up' is toward the east.

In 1928, due to the number of incorrect details that had appeared in the seal over the years, with the earliest being pointed out as in 1914), state printer Carroll H. Smith was authorized to prepare a new and correct seal. This seal was drawn by Los Angeles heraldic artist Marc J. Rowe who, among other corrections, narrowed the growing break in the mountains so that it appeared to be the Sacramento River, "fringed by snow-capped Sierra, and not an arm of San Francisco Bay, as the old seal made it appear". San Franciscans considered this change to be "a slight on their city in favor of Los Angeles". His design was not adopted as the official seal, although it was used by the State Printing Office. Nine years later, the 1937 standardized seal once again featured a widened gap of Golden Gate proportions, although it did keep Rowe's snow-capped Sierra Nevada that had replaced the barren foothills of previous editions of the seal. Both features have stayed in the official seal.

The 1937 standardization came about when state employees, wishing to print the seal on blotters for the State Fair, could not find any official design of the seal. This prompted a new law (Statutes of California, 1937, chapter 380), which "established for the first time a definite pictured design with which the master die was 'substantially' to conform, and at the same time established the legality of all previous seals which were essentially the same as this one."

The full color version, accepted as official, was created in 1978 by Jane Van Doren, Graphic Artist for the California State Printing Office (now the California Office of State Publishing). The location of the original painting is unknown.

== Popular beliefs and urban legends ==
=== Depiction of Fort Point ===
In the 1937 standardized seal there is a building on the far left rear hill that has been interpreted in a variety of ways. The building, along with the break in the mountains, may have been added to give San Francisco Bay a stronger claim on its location being the landscape portrayed in the seal. This building first appeared in unofficial versions of the seal as early as 1875, and in most of these, the building was clearly meant to represent Fort Point in San Francisco.

Interpretations as Fort Point

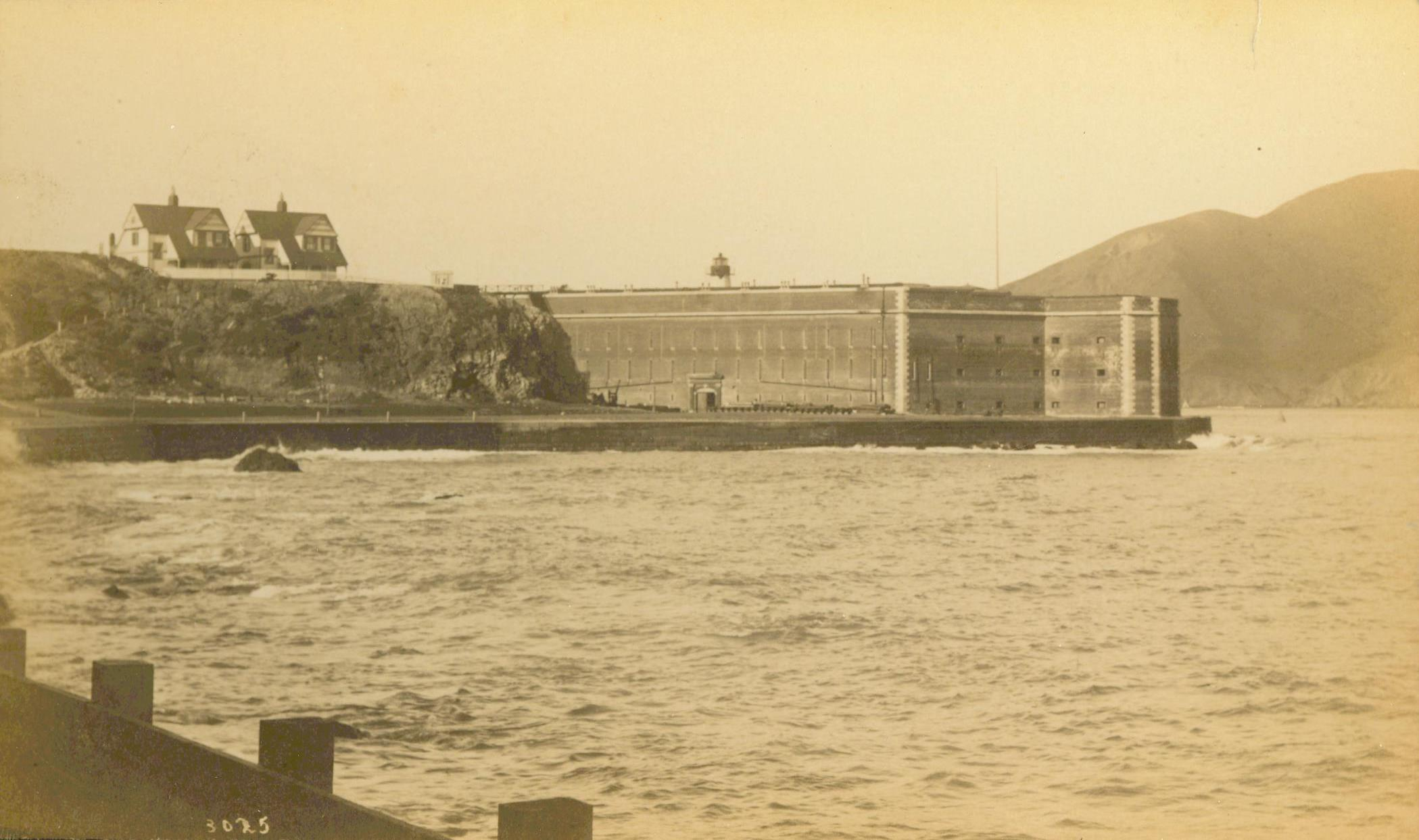
A circa 1888 image of Fort Point for comparison with representations of the fort on the following renditions of the Seal of California

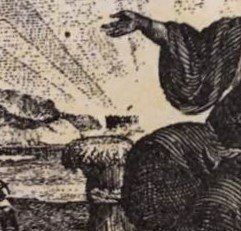
An 1875 image from a sample book by San Francisco lithographer Grafton Tyler Brown

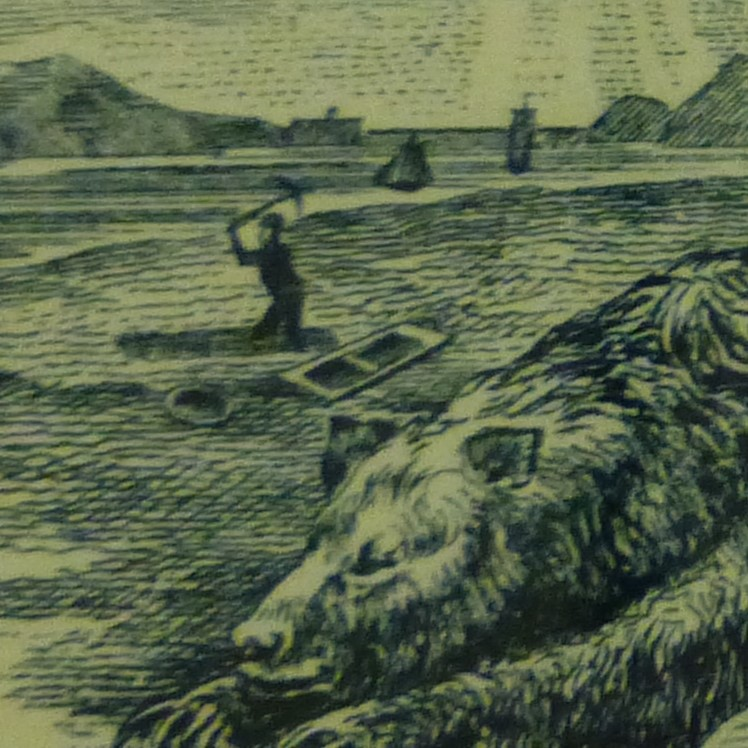
California State Letterhead (1886): Printed by a San Francisco lithographer

James Lick Pioneer Monument, San Francisco (1894)

So-called Dollar HK-249: Issued for the 1894 Midwinter Fair held in San Francisco. Notice the lighthouse and flagpole which appear in the circa 1888 image of the actual fort.

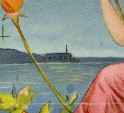
1895 cigar box label from an Oakland manufacturer

Spanish–American War flag at the California State Archives, Sacramento (c. 1898): Given to American soldiers on their way to the Philippines via the Presidio in San Francisco

However, the structure was given an apparent dome in the 1895 edition of the California Blue Book, and it was in this configuration that the building appeared in the 1937 standardization of the official seal. Fort Point has no dome, and it is unknown what building the 1895 artist was attempting to portray. Two years later, Harold F. Wilson, in his interpretation created for the old State Building in Los Angeles (now located inside the Ronald Reagan State Building in that city), retained the dome. In 1952, the structure, again with dome, was cast in bronze in the large seal at the west steps of the California State Capitol in Sacramento.

Versions of the Building with a Dome

California Blue Book (1895). The building is identical here to the way it appears in the 1937 standardized seal.

Ronald Reagan State Building, Los Angeles (1939)

On the west steps of the California State Capitol, Sacramento (1952)

There is a widespread rumor that the building in the seal found in front of the State Capitol had never appeared in any previous incarnation of the seal, and was meant to represent the chapel at San Quentin State Prison. The rumor states it was added as a "signature" of the prison inmates who cast it, as their alleged request to add their actual signatures was supposedly refused. The unsanctioned addition, so the story goes, was not noticed until it was too late to do anything about it, and so was left as is. Although this 3,400 pound, nearly ten foot wide seal was created in the foundry at San Quentin, the building depicted is not the chapel. If the building is taken as San Quentin and if the break in the mountains is taken to be the Golden Gate, then the view must be of the San Francisco Bay Area, looking from east to west. That would the building on the wrong side of the Gate to be San Quentin. No building in this form, including the chapel, has ever existed at San Quentin. The building first appeared in artistic renditions of the seal as early as 1875, decades before this seal was cast in 1952, and was officially added in 1937. The configuration of the building on this seal is very similar to its appearance in the 1937 standardization, which itself was based on the 1895 Blue Book rendition. Four detailed, post-1952 accounts of the seal make no mention of the rumor. One of those, a 1959 newspaper article written more than seven years after the placement of the seal, reported that "[t]he only criticism of the convicts' rendition of the seal is that they made the nose of [Minerva] too straight" and that the work "turned out so well it was planned to have the governor, Earl Warren, write the convicts commendations."

Resources Agency Building (1964)

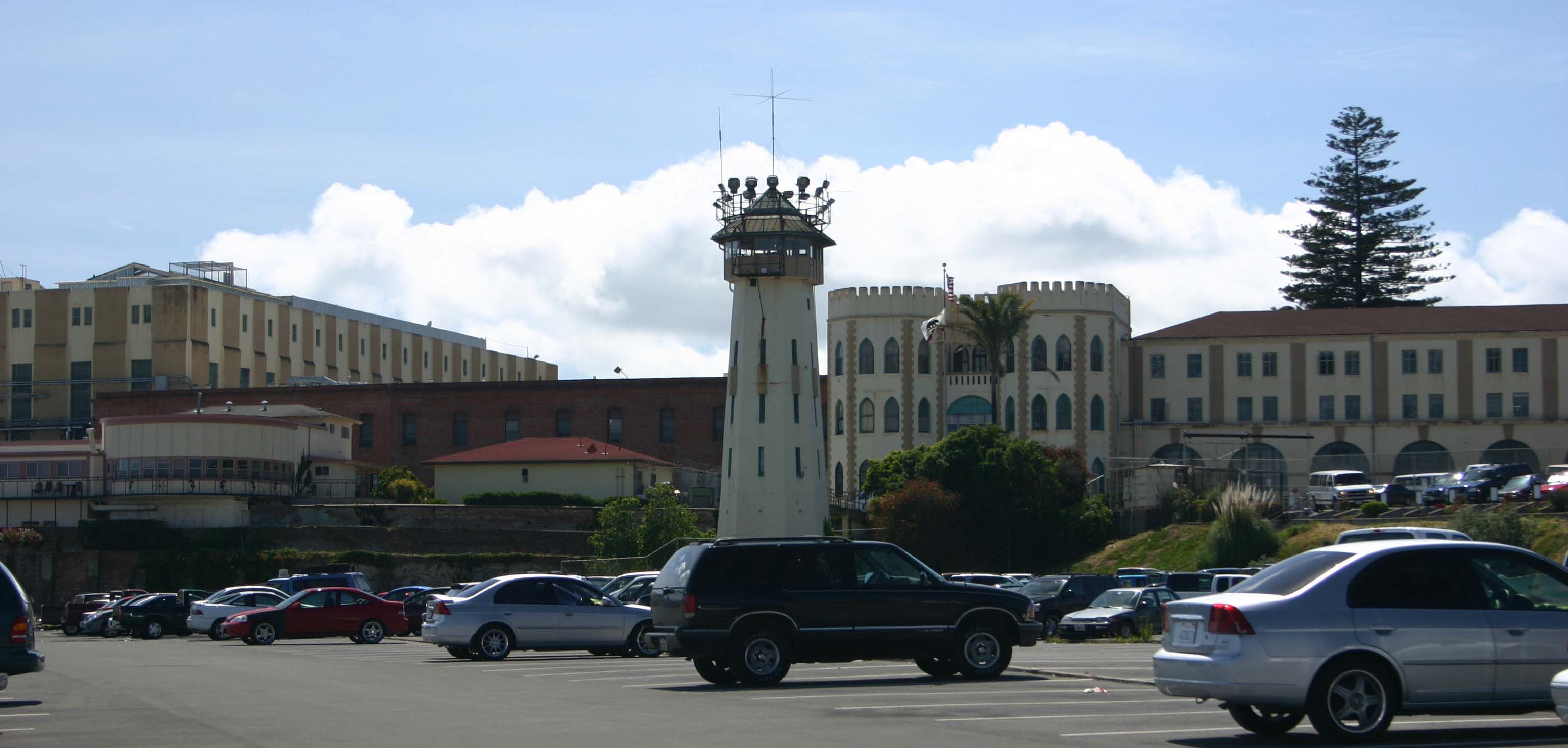
San Quentin State Prison

A possible source of the rumor

The source of this story is unknown, although it is possibly related to the large seal attached to the Resources Building in downtown Sacramento, placed in 1964, four years before the earliest known reference to the rumor in 1968. This seal features what appears to be two structures combined into one. The right half somewhat resembles the front gates of San Quentin State Prison has been said to resemble Folsom State Prison's Greystone Chapel. It is unknown why the artist chose this depiction. If the artist did mean for the building to be San Quentin and Folsom prisons, the rumor being mistakenly attached to the seal in front of the Capitol may have stemmed from a confusion of the two seals, which are blocks away from each other. A postcard dated 2000 shows an image of the State Capitol at night, with an inset image of the seal. The seal used is the one on the Resources Building. The official color scheme for the seal (e.g., "the spear of Minerva shall be Oakwood, Cable No. 70094 and the tip white"), passed in 1967—thirty years after the structure was officially added—does not mention the building.

Other interpretations of the building
Because there is no official designation of the identity of the building, artists have interpreted the building in a number of ways.

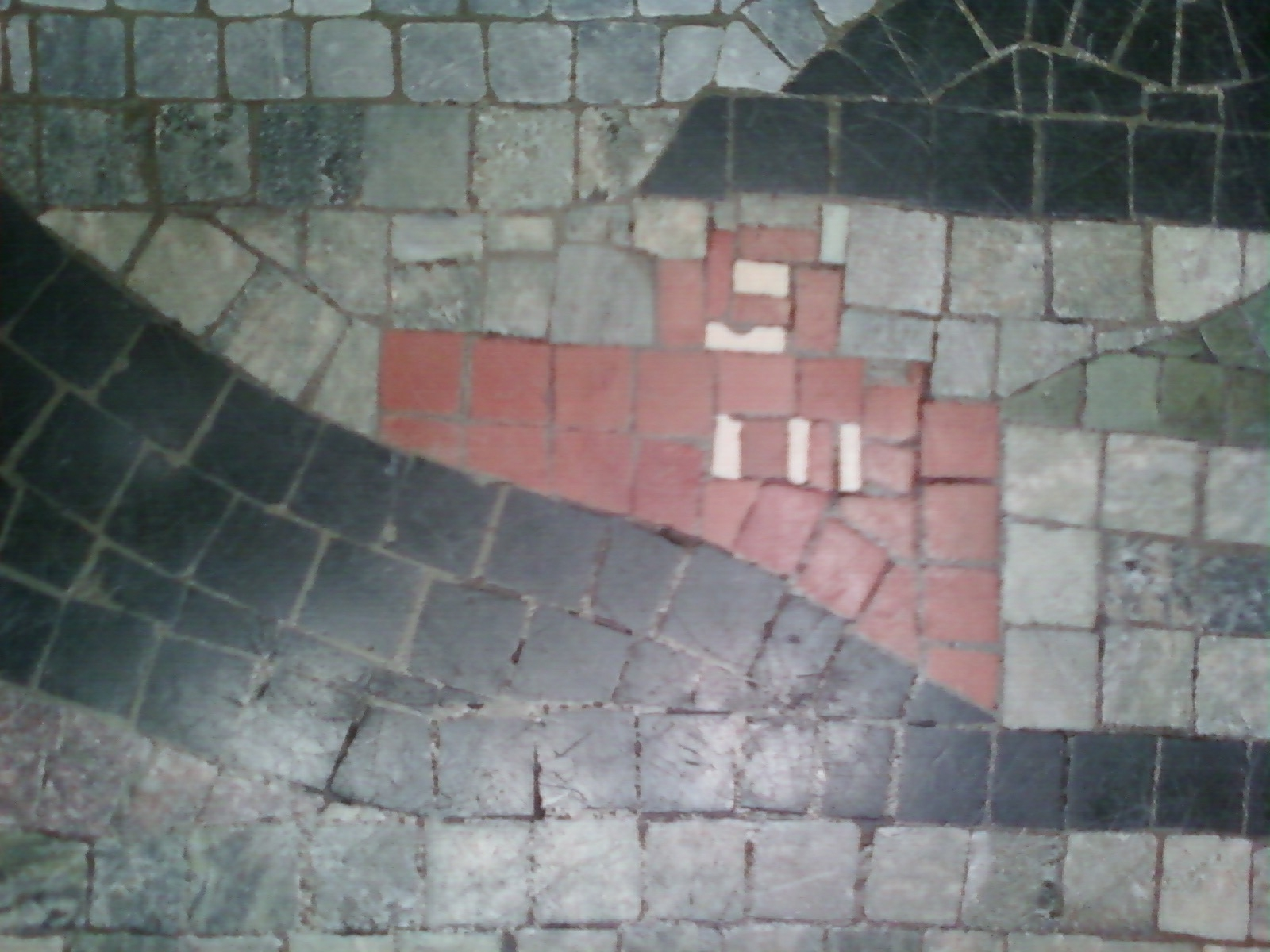
San Mateo County History Museum, Redwood City (1910)

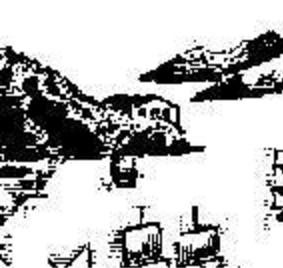
Veteran's Welfare Bond (1925): Here the building looks somewhat like the old State Capitol in Benicia.

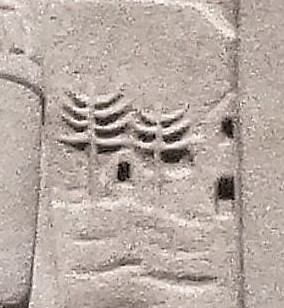
Above the entrance to the San Diego Museum of Art in Balboa Park, this 1926 seal places the building behind Minerva.

Room 500, Library and Courts I, Sacramento (c. 1928)

Marc J. Rowe's redesign (1928)

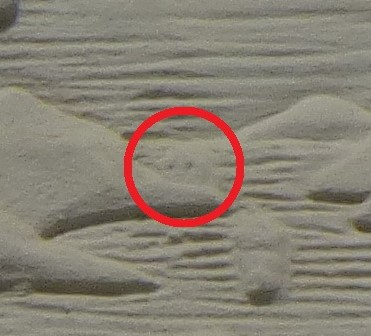
Berkeley Veterans Memorial Building (1928)

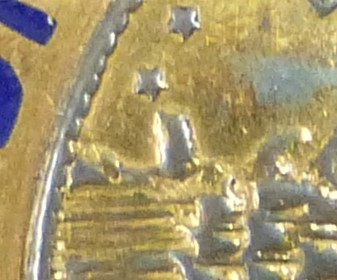
Division of Motor Vehicles inspector's badge (c. 1921–1931) in the collection of the CHP Museum in West Sacramento

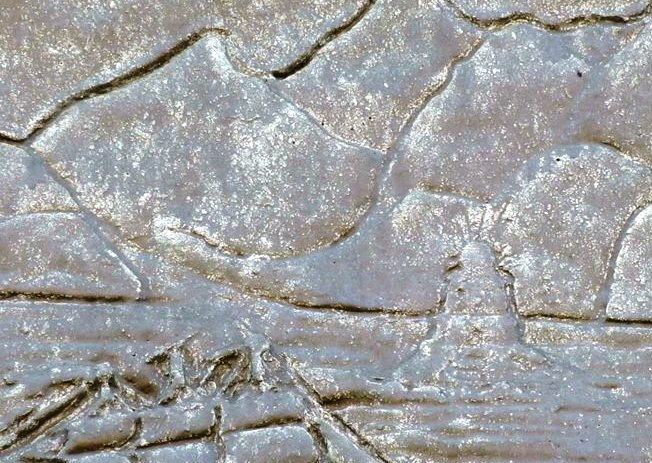
The reproduction of the medal the Los Angeles-based Helms Bakery won in 1934, showing a building that looks like the Los Angeles Harbor Light, which may explain the location of the structure on an island, away from its usual spot on the mainland, similar to the light house

Lucile Lloyd Mural in Room 4203, California State Capitol, Sacramento (1937)

East Entrance, California State Capitol, Sacramento (1950): Here in the O. C. Malmquist panels, the building takes on more of a Spanish mission look, exchanging the dome for a similarly shaped curved roof line.

State Personnel Board, Sacramento (1954): After more than fifty years, is this interpretation meant to be a return to Fort Point? Despite the difference in design from the previous image, this seal was also created by O. C. Malmquist.

California State Archives, Sacramento (c. 1956): Another possible throwback to Fort Point?

1304 O Street, Sacramento (1960): Many seals found on state buildings from approximately 1960-1980 do not show the building, which might explain why the 1967 official color scheme makes no mention of it.

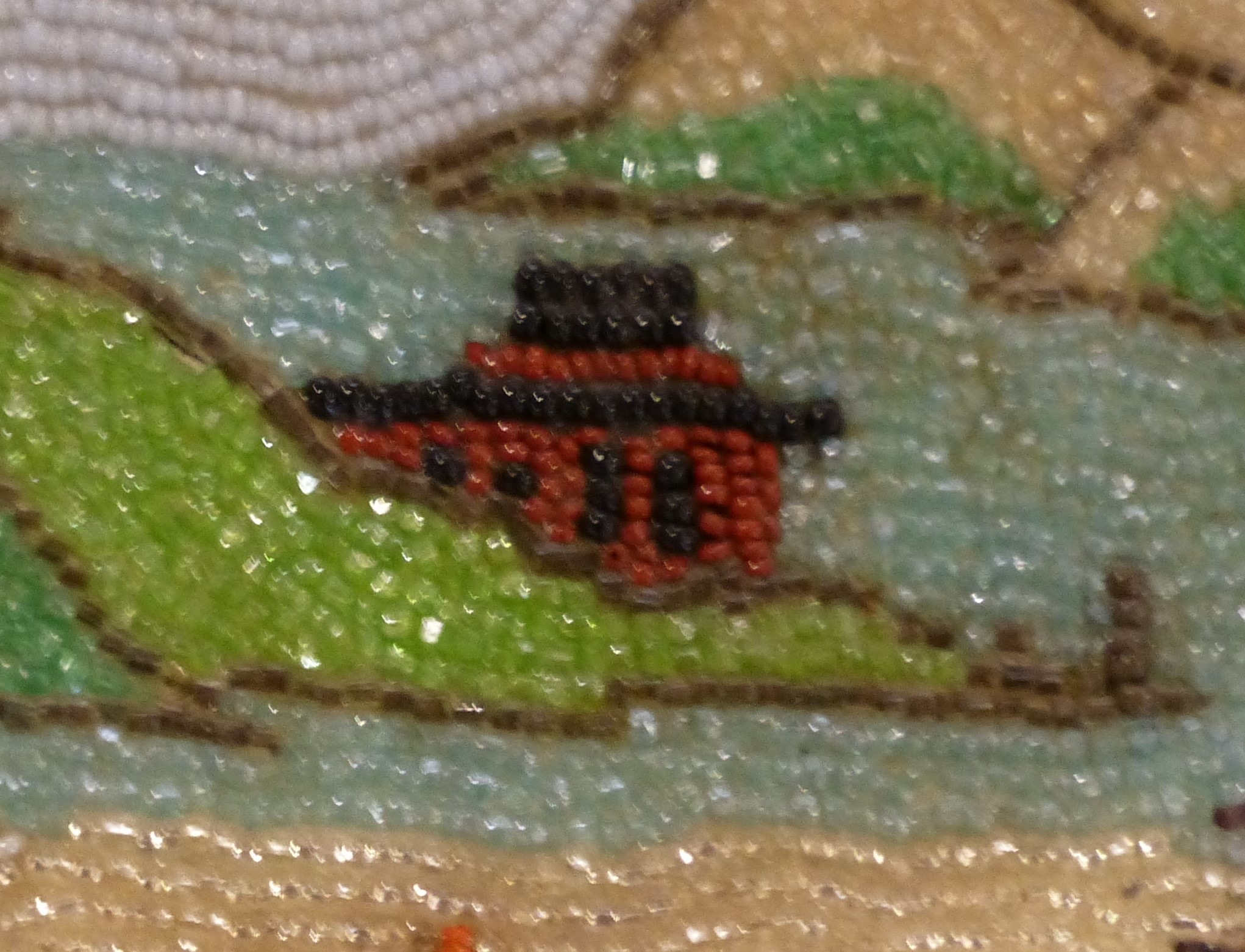
California State Archives, Sacramento (1966): Artist Mrs. Pine L. Eisfeller used 87,000 tiny beads to create this seal.

Elihu M. Harris State Building, Oakland (1998): Although this example is from twenty years later, this style of building had been in use as early as 1978.

Vietnam Memorial, Capitol Park, Sacramento (1988)

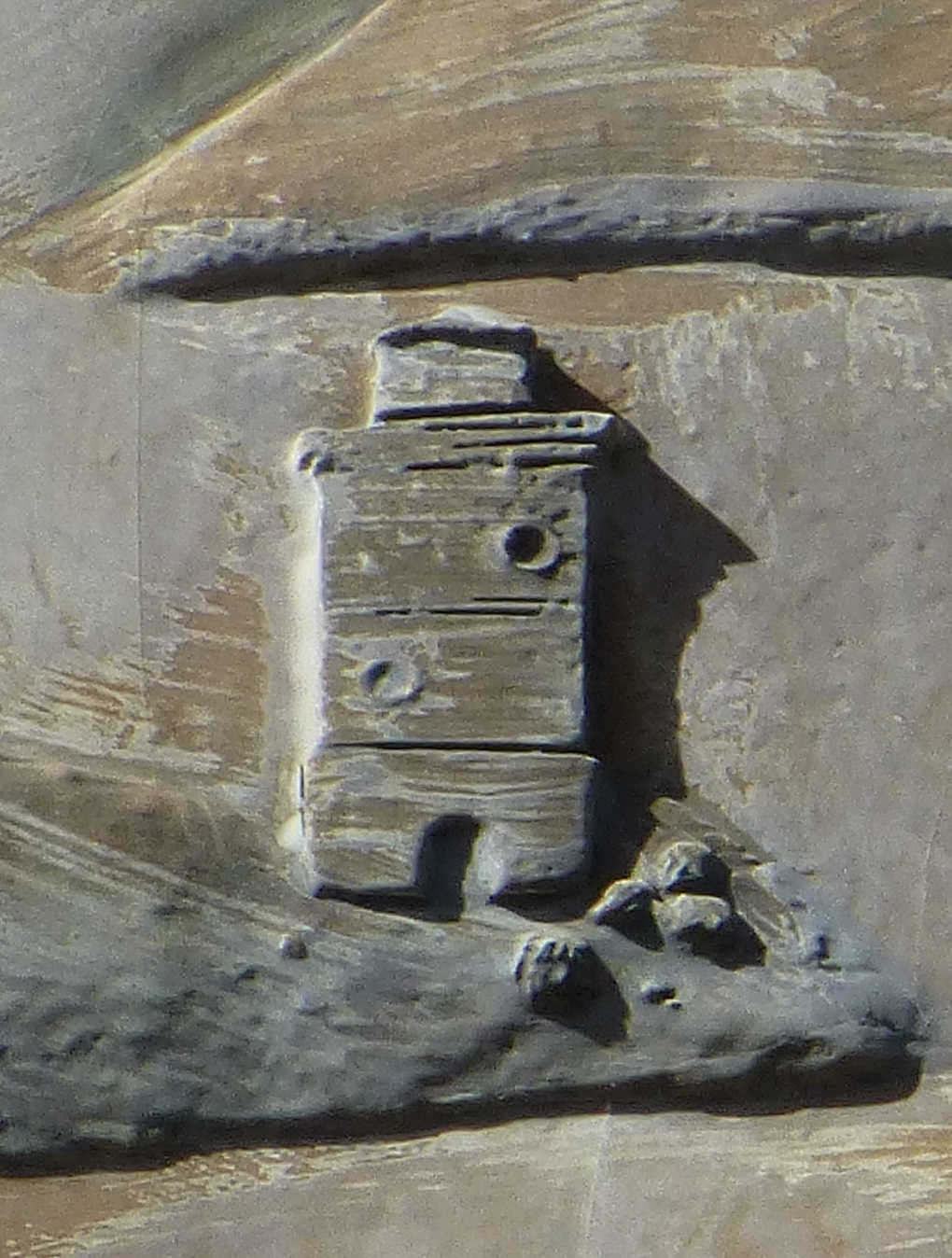
Family Law Court, downtown Riverside (1998): The artist of this seal may have based his interpretation of the building on the Peace Tower found on Mount Rubidoux, a local Riverside landmark.

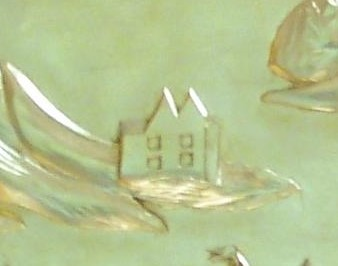
Hiram Johnson State Building, San Francisco (c. 1998): The building on this seal, in the building's auditorium, looks somewhat like one of the city's famous painted ladies Victorian homes.

Governor's Office Reception Area Carpet, California State Capitol, Sacramento (c. 1999)

CalTrans District 7 HQ, Los Angeles (2004): Another unusual interpretation

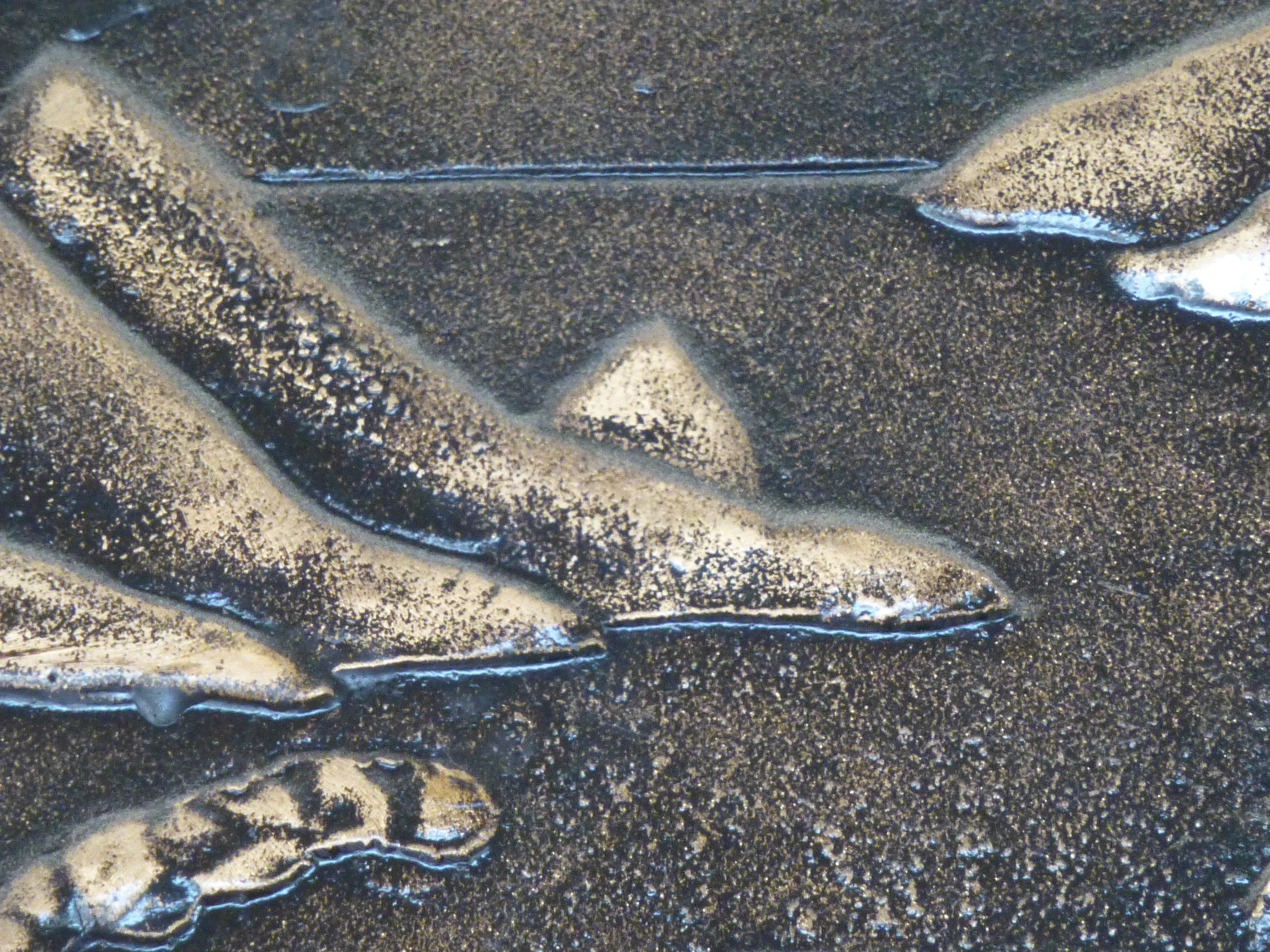
B. F. Sisk Courthouse, Fresno (c. 2010)

DMV, First Avenue, Sacramento (Present day two-tone)

Department of Education, Sacramento (Present day full color): The building has taken on more of a tower rather than a dome.

=== Conflation with County Seal ===
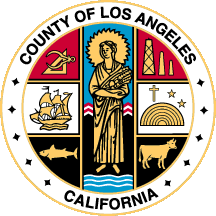
With cross, 1957–2004

With Mission San Gabriel Arcángel, 2004–2014, 2016–present

Two versions of the Seal of the County of Los Angeles

Another rumor associated with the Great Seal of the State of California is that it once featured a cross which had since been removed. The source of this story is most likely a confusion of the state seal and its supposed chapel with the Seal of Los Angeles County and its crossless view of Mission San Gabriel Arcángel. This county seal did include a cross from its creation in 1957 until 2004, when a threatened lawsuit by the American Civil Liberties Union encouraged the Los Angeles County Board of Supervisors to remove the cross and make other design changes to the seal. (A similar lawsuit earlier in the year led to the removal of a cross from the seal of the city of Redlands.) The mistaken idea that there had once been a cross on the state seal itself quickly spread, appearing as near to Los Angeles as Long Beach and as far away as New Hampshire before the county seal had been officially changed.

=== The steam vessel ===
The real-life identity of the steam vessel, whether actual or not, shown at the far left of the seal is a subject of debate and other urban legends.

An interpretation of the steamship as a sidewheeler

In 2004, the California State Legislature passed Assembly Concurrent Resolution 131, authored by Dave Cox. ACR 131 renamed part of U.S. Route 50 in Sacramento County in honor of multiethnic California pioneer William Alexander Leidesdorff Jr. It read, in part: "WHEREAS, In 1847, William Alexander Leidesdorff, Jr. captained the first and only steamship in California prior to the Gold Rush of 1848, the Sitka. His maiden steam voyage up the Sacramento River is immortalized on the California State Seal and recognizes his vision for increased maritime transportation of California's agricultural products to world markets." A vessel of thirty-seven feet length, nine feet breadth of beam, and eighteen inch draw, for her trial voyage on San Francisco Bay a very large passenger was repeatedly warned not to stir from his "post of honor immediately over the boiler," and on her only voyage to Sacramento in November/December 1847 it was reported that the baby of one of her passengers needed to be passed around to keep the "crank" vessel trim. Her career as a steam vessel was short-lived, as she sank at anchorage in February of the next year during a gale in San Francisco. "Thus perished the first steamer on the Bay, a mere toy, and a most dangerous one too," reported San Francisco's Californian, "Should she be resuscitated by the owner we sincerely hope that none of our citizens will trust themselves with a passage in her beyond the 'flat' that she now rests upon." The pioneering and enterprising Leidesdorff did indeed have her raised and refitted as a schooner, the Rainbow, and she continued to run on the Sacramento River after the discovery of gold.

An interpretation of the steamship as a screw steamer

In his 2001 book, Maritime Tragedies on the Santa Barbara Channel, Justin Ruhge suggested that, "When Major Garnett laid out the seal, he included a number of sailing ships and on the middle left side of the seal he also drew in a steam bark. It is likely that this is the U.S.S. Edith. The ship in the drawing is a steamer without side wheels. At that time only the U.S.S. Edith was such a ship. The only other steamer on the west coast at that time was the much larger steamer California that was driven by side wheels." The USS Edith, a screw steamer, was sent from San Francisco Bay to Santa Barbara and San Diego in August 1849 to pick up the delegates for the upcoming constitutional convention. On the second day out, the Edith ran aground in a heavy fog at about 10 p.m. south of Point Sal, at the north end of what would become Vandenberg Air Force Base. There was no loss of life and the captain and crew were later exonerated by a Court of Inquiry, but the ship and her cargo had to be abandoned. Garnett, a passenger, was left in charge of the salvage efforts. Sam Pollard reported that "a few days after the wreck [Garnett] came to San Luis Obispo and was my guest for two weeks ... and showed me the work he was doing on [the State Seal] in my store at San Luis Obispo." Leidesdorff's Sitka was a sidewheeler as well.

=== The number of stars ===
Seals found in government buildings have been known to contain errors: a thirty-eight star seal was on display at the San Diego County courthouse from 1889 until its demolition in 1959—seventy years—and the seal sculpted into the tympanum of the 1928 Stanley Mosk Library and Courts I building in Sacramento, where the Supreme Court of California sits while in the capital, shows twenty-one stars. Within the California State Capitol itself, the seals carved into the secretary's desk on the Senate floor and the clerk's desk on the Assembly floor, both in use since 1870, contain only thirteen stars. Twenty-nine star seals are attached to the B. F. Sisk Courthouse in Fresno, the Senator Alfred E. Alquist State Building in San Jose, the Justice Joseph A. Rattigan State Building in Santa Rosa, and the Van Nuys State Office Building in Van Nuys.

An incorrect number of stars had been a widespread problem for some time; "Numerous reproductions of the seal are found in well-known books and other widely circulated printed matter which show thirty-two stars instead of thirty-one", wrote the Los Angeles Times in 1937. In 1914, seals were found to have as few as eleven, and as many as thirty-eight, stars. A version of the seal showing thirty-eight stars appeared on the title page of the 1887, 1889, 1893, 1895 (the 1895 edition also showed a thirty-two star on page 299), and 1899 editions of the California Blue Book, a publication of the Office of the Secretary of State, who is the custodian of the Great Seal. No seal appeared on the title page of the 1903 or 1907 editions. A thirty-one star seal was used in the 1909 edition, but the publication went back to thirty-eight stars in 1911 and 1915, then settled on thirty-one in 1924.

One notable occurrence of a seal with an incorrect number of stars being shown occurred in 2011, when live television coverage of the Conrad Murray trial went to break. A seal, most likely located in the courthouse where the trial took place, was shown, and it was soon discovered that this seal had thirty-two stars instead of the proper thirty-one. This error was interpreted by some as an intentional clue that the trial was a hoax, Michael Jackson was still alive, and had faked his own death.

Various numbers of stars on various seals

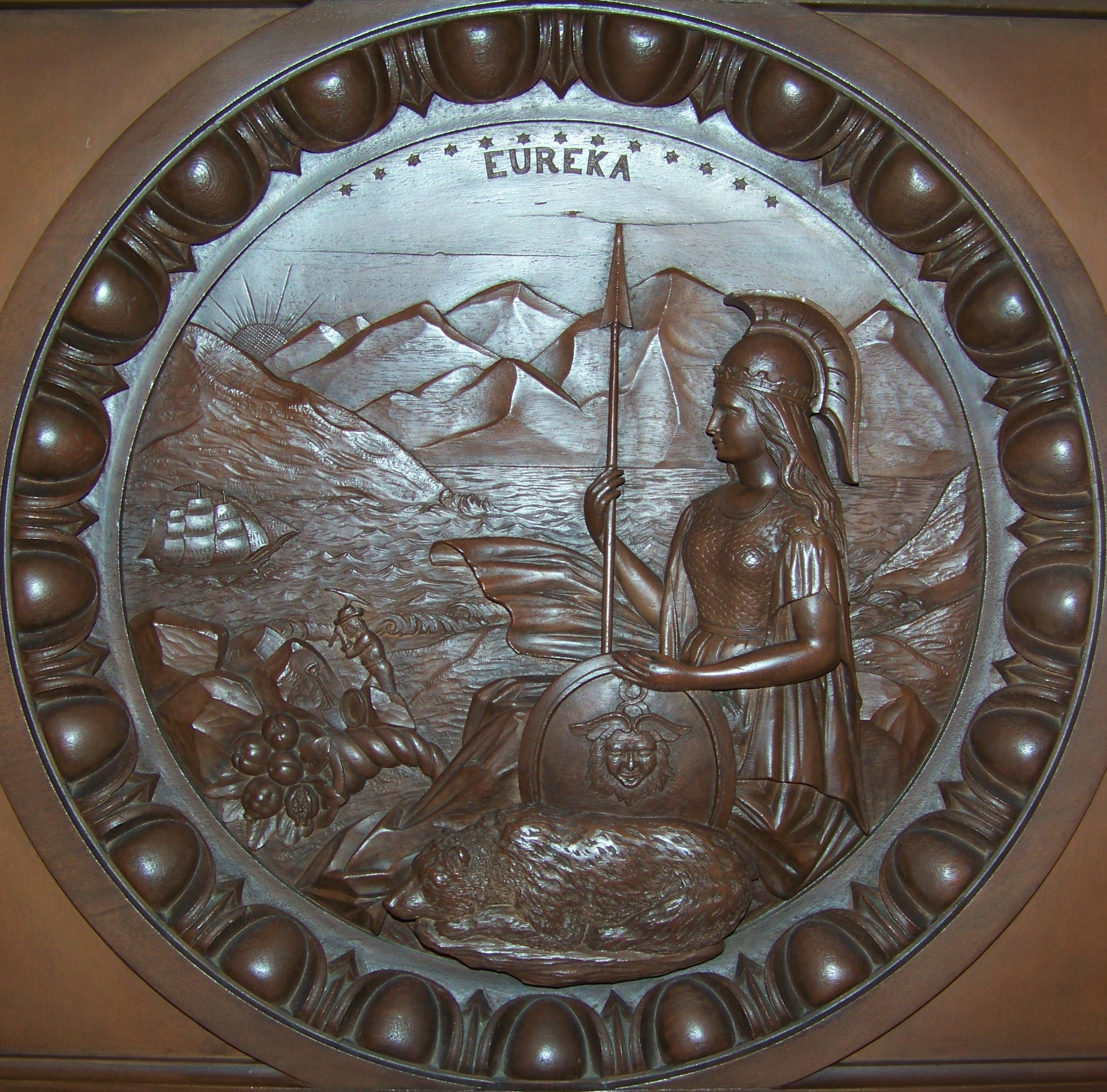
Thirteen star seal, Senate Secretary's Desk, California State Capitol, Sacramento

Twenty-one star seal, Stanley Mosk Library and Courts Building, Sacramento

Twenty-six star seal, Hiram Johnson State Building auditorium, San Francisco

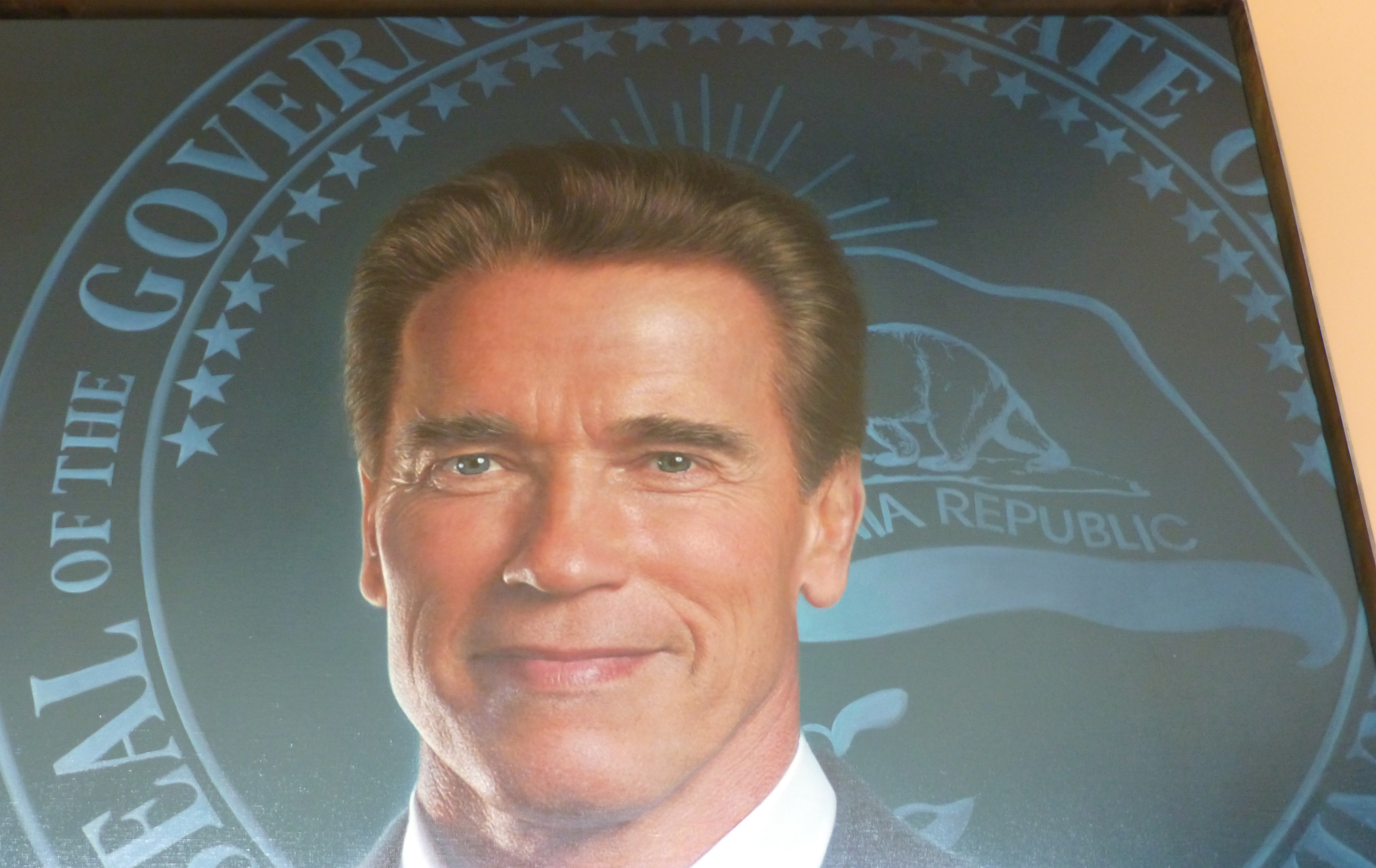
Twenty-nine star California Governor's Seal, which should have thirty-one, as the state seal does, California State Capitol, Sacramento

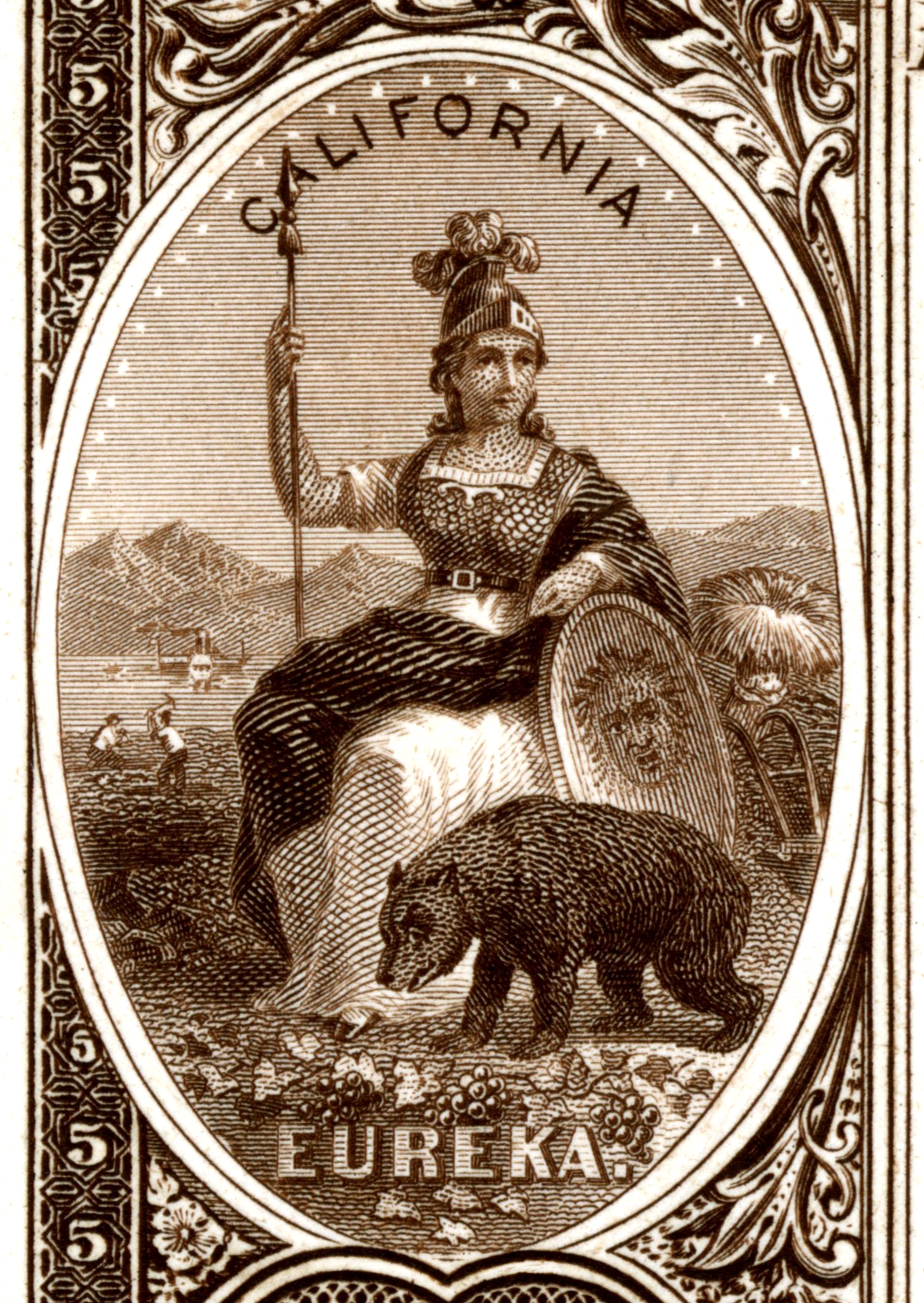
Twenty-nine star seal on the reverse of a Series 1882BB National Bank Note

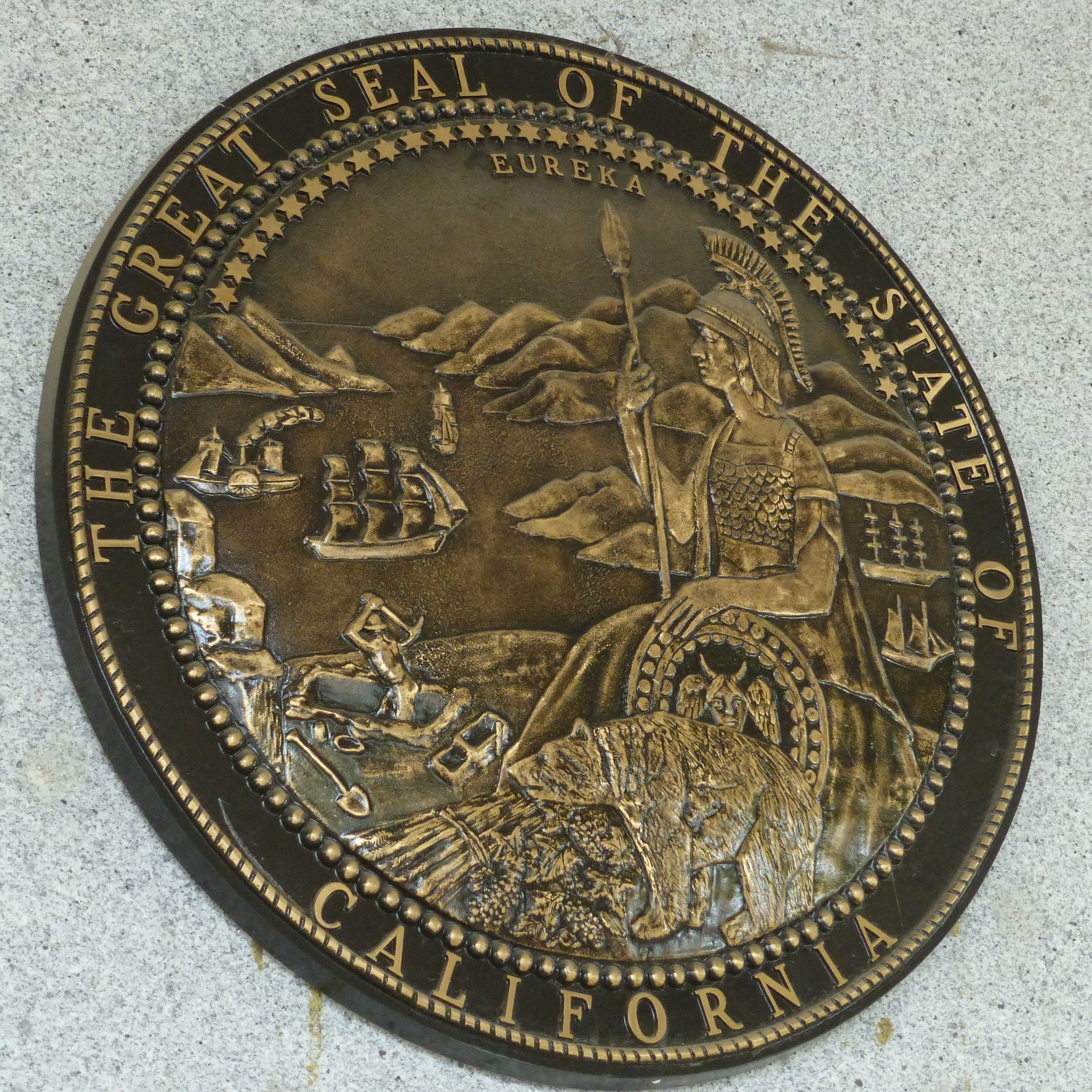
Twenty-nine star seal on the B.F. Sisk Courthouse in Fresno

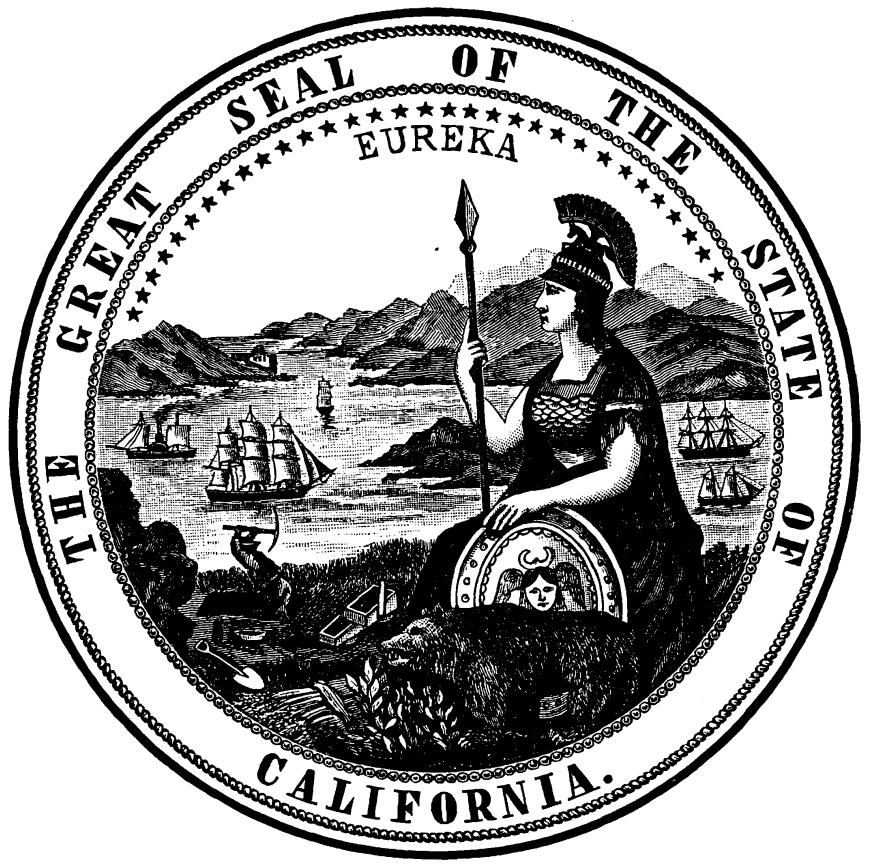
Thirty-two star seal, 1895 California Blue Book, page 299

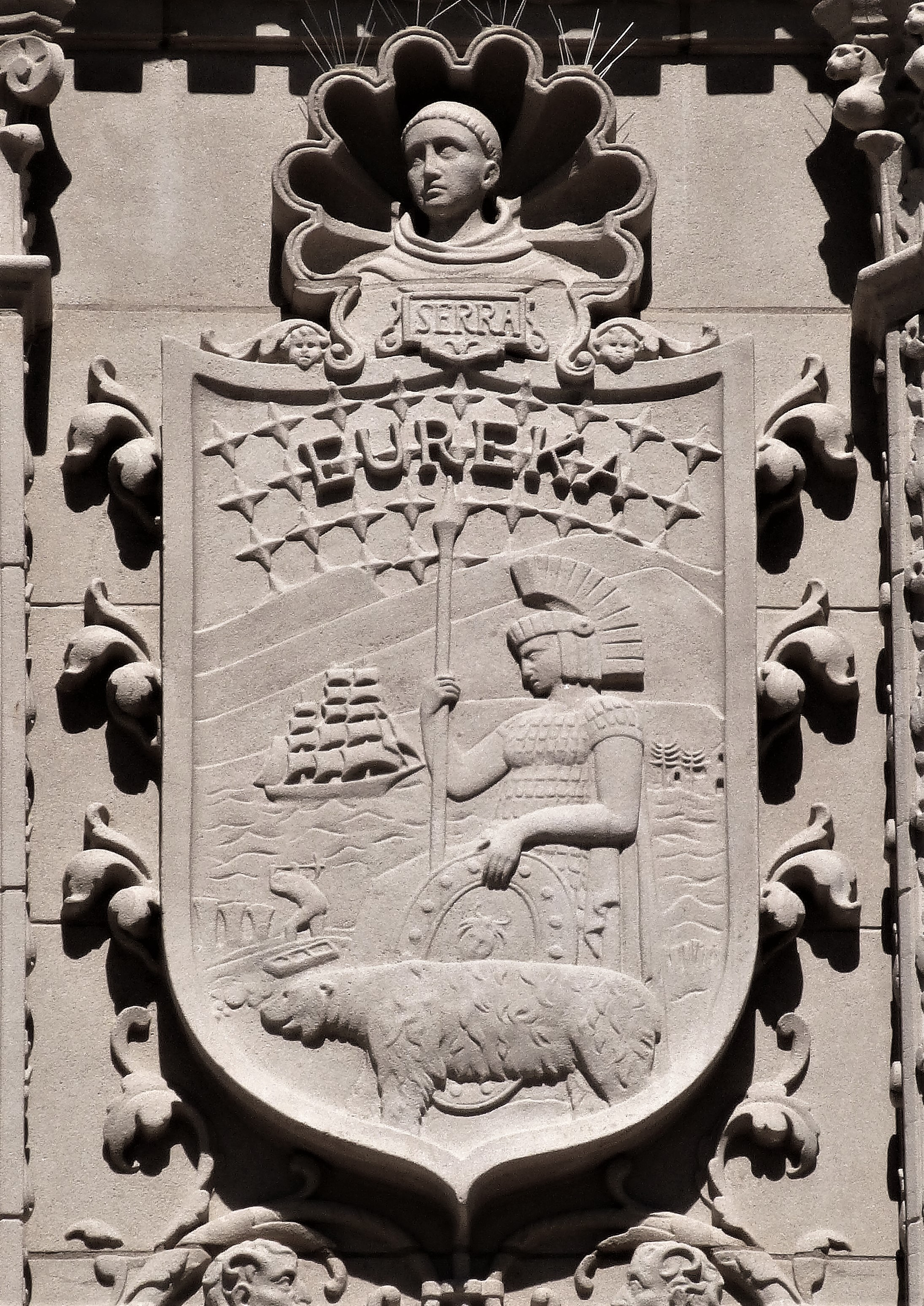
Thirty-three star seal above the entrance to the 1926 San Diego Museum of Art in Balboa Park

Thirty-eight star seal, 1895 California Blue Book, title page

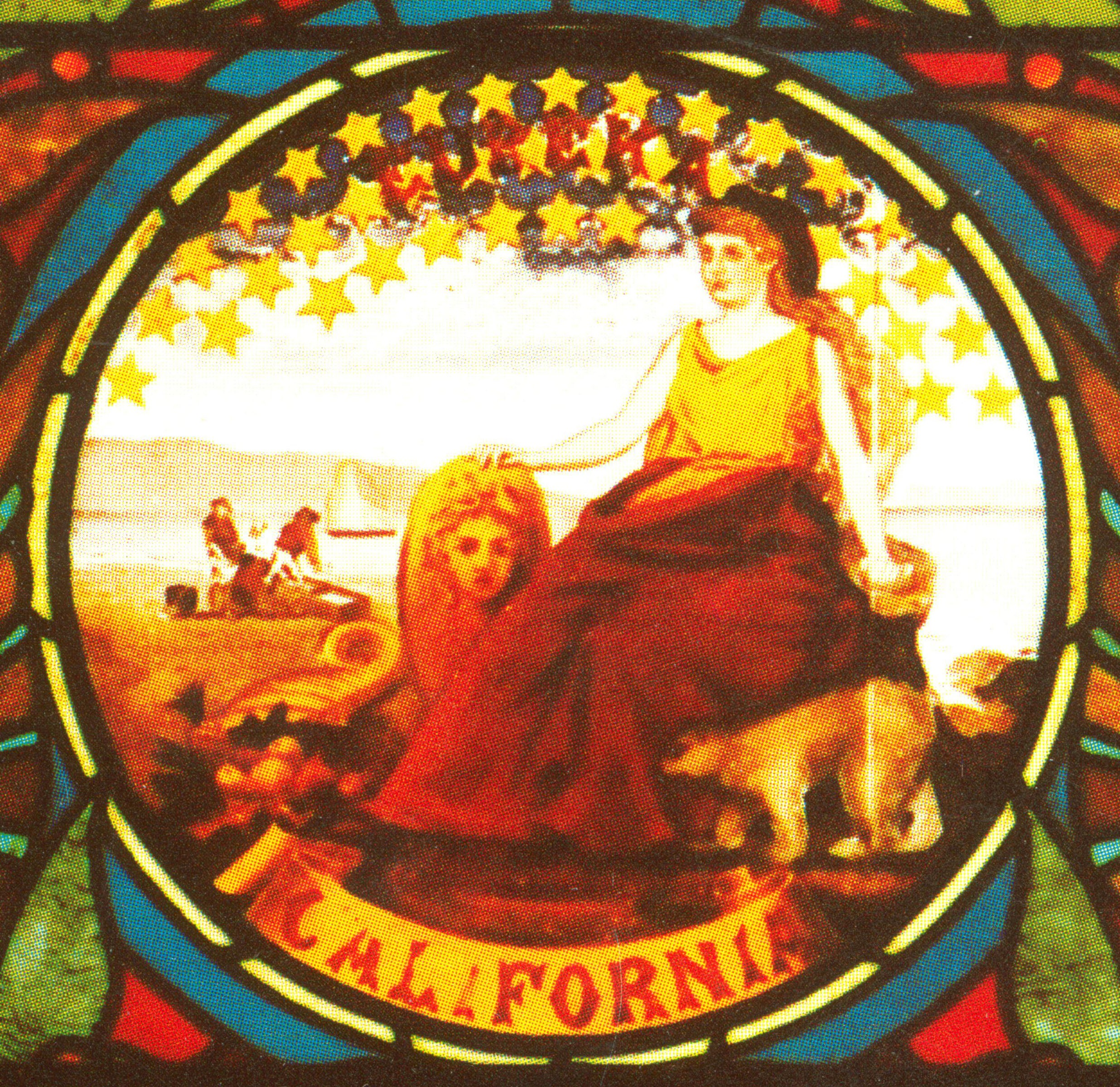
Thirty-eight star seal, 1889 San Diego County courthouse

== Controversies and other issues ==
=== Vallejo's, Lyon's, and Garnett's roles in the creation of the Seal ===
During the 1849 Constitutional Convention debate on the design of the seal, the bear was added to satisfy Major J.R. Snyder and the men of the Bear Flag Revolt. This addition was objected to by native Californio Mariano Guadalupe Vallejo, former head of the Mexican military in California, but a friend of the United States. He introduced an amendment to remove the bear, or, if it were to remain, that it be held fast by a vaquero's lasso. The amendment failed.

In February 1850, the Daily Alta California of San Francisco accused Lyon of taking the $1000 appropriated to him by the convention for the purpose of securing a die and press, but giving a marred design, a die sunk too shallow, and an insufficiently powerful press for the job in return. The editorial continued that Lyon "received his money out of the civil fund, and is now conveying it to the sylvan retreats of Lyonsdale" and quite vehemently stated that Lyon had "no right or title to the honor of either designing or executing the seal any more than the Kha[n] of Tartary" while still protecting the anonymity of Garnett. However, the fact that Garnett was chiefly responsible for the design was known by at least one observer of the convention at the time and generally known no later than December 1849.

Controversy arose again in 1899 with an article in the San Francisco Chronicle that claimed that Garnett's design was not original, but in fact based upon the seal of the Independent Order of Odd Fellows' California Lodge No. 1, with a few changes. This article was soon followed by a defense of the originality of the design written by Major Garnett's brother, Louis A. Garnett, who claimed that the timing of the creation of and differences between the two seals made it impossible for the state seal to have been based on the lodge seal. Despite this, the Grand Lodge of California continues to make this claim, and an I.O.O.F. historian has suggested that perhaps Garnett in fact designed both seals.

=== Contention within the state government over the use and design of the Seal ===
The Golden Gate Bridge found its way onto this seal

The motto, "Eureka," spelled with Greek letters

The two "errors" in the seal pointed out by Secretary of State Frank M. Jordan to State Architect Anson Boyd in 1958

In 1855, conflict arose over the seal between Governor John Bigler and the Secretary of State James W. Denver. Denver, who had been elected to the United States Congress (and in whose honor the city of Denver, Colorado, was named), left for Washington, D.C., on October 5, but his resignation was not effective until November 5. Bigler asked for an immediate resignation and threatened to declare the office vacant and appoint a new Secretary of State if this request was refused. In the same letter, he also requested that the Great Seal be kept in the Governor's Office. Denver refused the request, as it would be impossible for him to fulfill his duties without it, and cited the fact that the seal had always been kept in the possession of the Secretary of State. On October 6, Bigler appointed his private secretary, C.H. Hempstead, to the office, and, accompanied by two witnesses, went to the office of the Secretary of State to have the appointment certified. Denver's deputy refused to certify, as he argued that the office would not be vacated until November 5, the effective date of Denver's resignation. It was not until that date that Hempstead's appointment was finally certified.

In 1958, a disagreement arose between Secretary of State Frank M. Jordan and State Architect Anson Boyd over the design of the seal being used on state buildings in Sacramento. One seal showed the Golden Gate Bridge crossing over the gap in the mountains, and another spelled "Eureka" in Greek letters. Assistant State Architect P.T. Poage explained that the Division of Architecture "had considered making a model of the seal" in order to "keep the architects from making improvements." Jordan responded by promising to "sponsor legislation in 1959 to provide greater protection on use of the seal."

=== Symbols in the Seal and the Seal as a symbol ===
A detail of the face of Medusa on Minerva's shield from the seal Pastor Brown called "an affront"

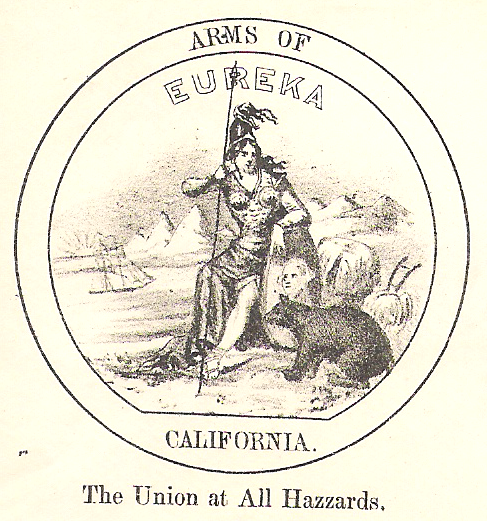
A seal from a Civil War-era piece of stationery, replacing Medusa's face with what appears to be the visage of George Washington

A few days after the Symbionese Liberation Army's Hibernia Bank robbery in San Francisco of April 15, 1974, an Associated Press wire photo and caption of the bronze seal on the west steps of the State Capitol showed a detail of Minerva's shield. On the shield appeared the head of Medusa, with seven snakes for hair. The seven-headed cobra, the caption pointed out, was the symbol of the SLA. In 1994, after seeing Minerva and Medusa on the bronze seal at the west steps of the State Capitol, Pastor Margo Brown called it "an affront to women and Christian faith." "I was shocked and amazed to see a woman [Minerva] in a man's uniform," the Sacramento Bee reported her saying, "And there was a picture of Medusa with snakes on her head. I'm very proud of my gender and women need to be portrayed in a better light." She led a crusade at the Capitol to call for a redesign of the seal, but the seal remains unchanged.

Other protests on the Capitol steps have used the seal as a rallying point: in 1960, a group picketing the execution of Caryl Chessman gathered around the seal and said, "blame our leaders," in 1967 signs reading "I Protest" and "Thou Shalt Not Kill" were left on the seal to protest the execution of Aaron Mitchell, later that year a black casket representing "the living dead farm worker" was the centerpiece of a "funeral" march and placed atop the seal for an all-night vigil, and in 1990 the seal was marked with handprints of red paint by members of ACT UP, protesting possible state health care cuts.

=== Errors in the Seal ===
An early 1900s envelope, reportedly sent by the state to a newspaper editor, bore a copy of the seal missing the bear.

In 1982, after a year-long probe, a $300,000-plus counterfeiting ring was busted in Los Angeles by Department of Motor Vehicles agents. The counterfeiters had been producing false pink slips and other identity papers using a fraudulent seal. The mistake the counterfeiters made that first tipped off investigators was the misspelling of "Seal" as "Seat." The possibility of the use of fraudulent seals for unscrupulous gain had been discussed in the press as early as 1878.

This was followed in 1988 by the discovery that on a number of documents printed by the state printing office, Minerva's face had taken on the look of Snoopy, the beagle of Peanuts cartoon fame. The error was first discovered in the Department of Corrections newsletter, printed by prison labor, and so it was first suspected to be a prank by the inmates. It was later revealed that the source of the error was a worn printing plate, and so was not intentional.

While most errors on the seal are unintentional, at least one was done "on porpoise": the staff of Assemblyman Jerry Lewis once ordered a birthday cake for their boss with a California seal on it, but it was "the kind that has flippers, swims in the ocean and eats fish."

== Examples of the Seal ==
=== Sacramento ===
The seal can be seen in its various incarnations near the entrances of a number of state buildings in downtown Sacramento, including the State Capitol (as well as several inside of the Capitol, including an 1854 carving and a 1908 stained glass "sky" light), Stanley Mosk Library and Courts I (within the tympanum at 914 Capitol Mall), Department of Rehabilitation (721 Capitol Mall, not to be confused the Department of Corrections and Rehabilitation), State Personnel Board (801 Capitol Mall), Employment Development Department (722/800 Capitol Mall), Resources Agency (1416 Ninth Street), Secretary of State (1500 Eleventh Street), CalTrans (1121 O Street), Office of the State Fire Marshal (1131 S Street), and the Department of Motor Vehicles (2415 First Avenue). A hand-painted seal which used to be on display at the old Oakland State Building (1111 Jackson Street) until its closure following the Loma Prieta earthquake of 1989 can today be seen just within the front entrance of the state building at 1304 O Street, Sacramento. In West Sacramento, on the opposite shore of the Sacramento River from Old Sacramento, near the entrance to the headquarters of the California Department of General Services in the distinctive Ziggurat building, is another seal. Near the base of the James W. Marshall monument at Marshall Gold Discovery State Historic Park in nearby Coloma, can be found an artistic rendition of the seal from 1890.

A selection of seals found around Sacramento

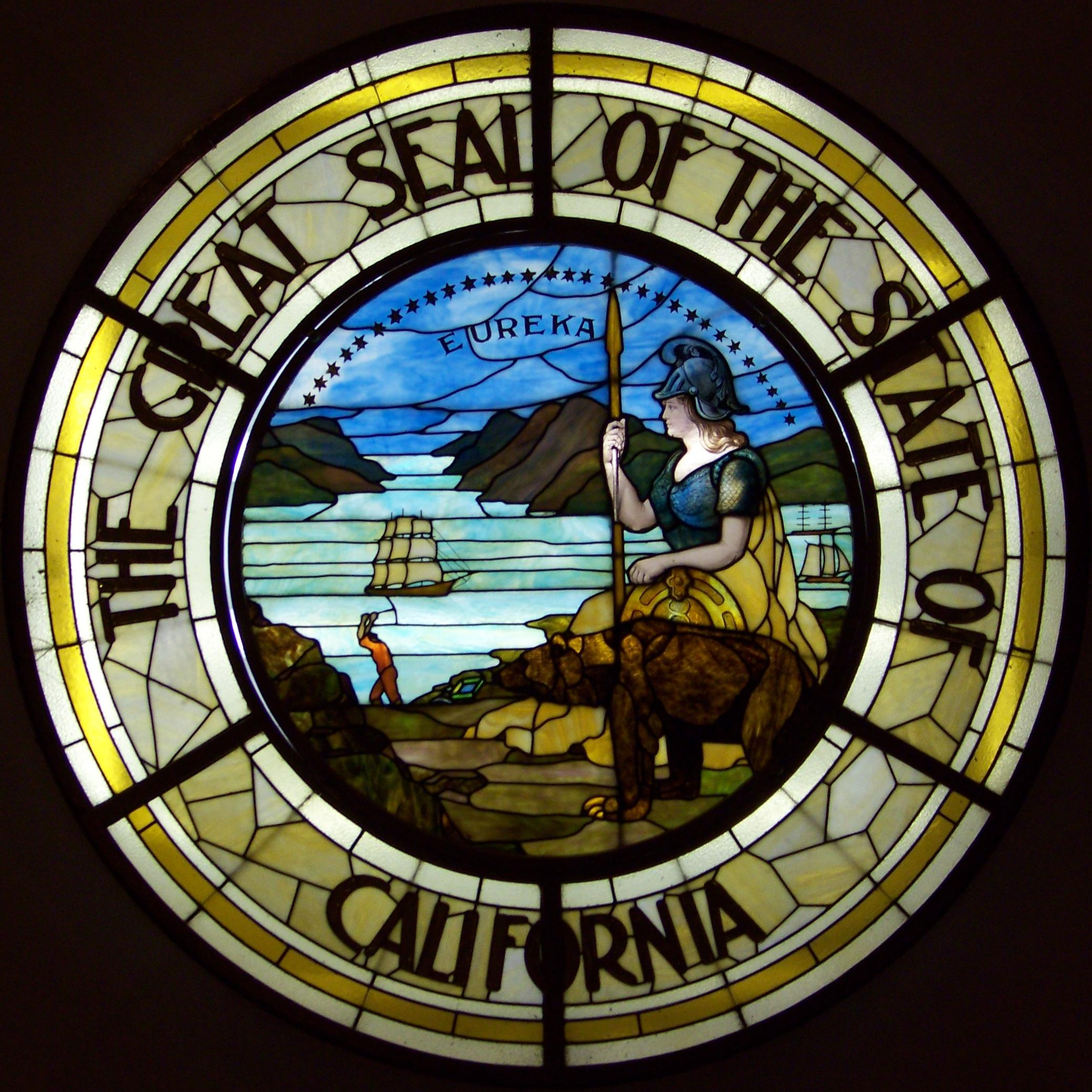
1908 "sky" light seal in the California State Capitol

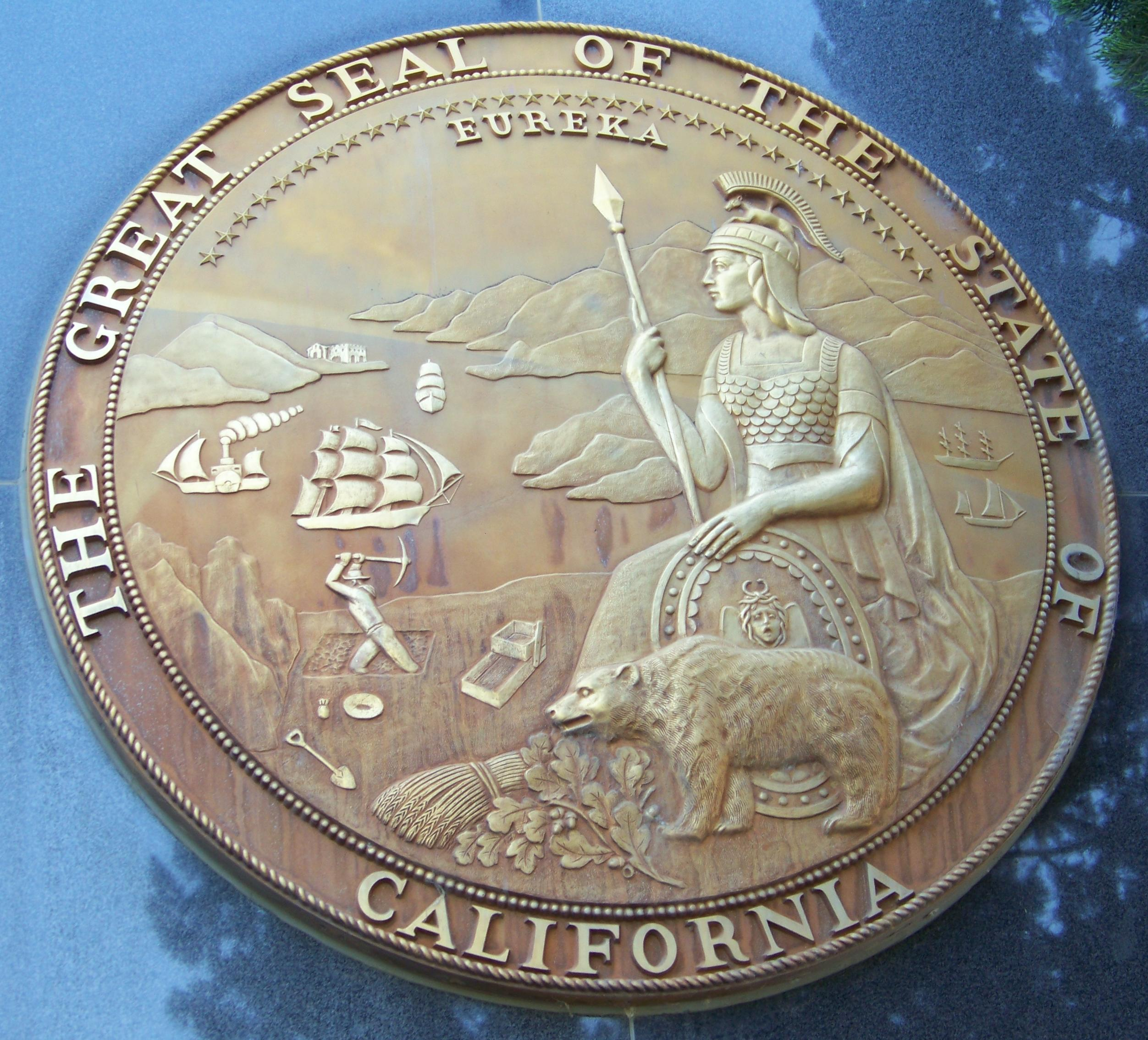
1964 seal (one of two) on display at the Resources Agency Building

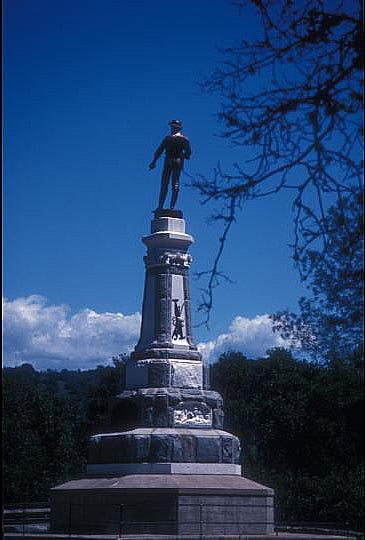
The James W. Marshall monument in Coloma

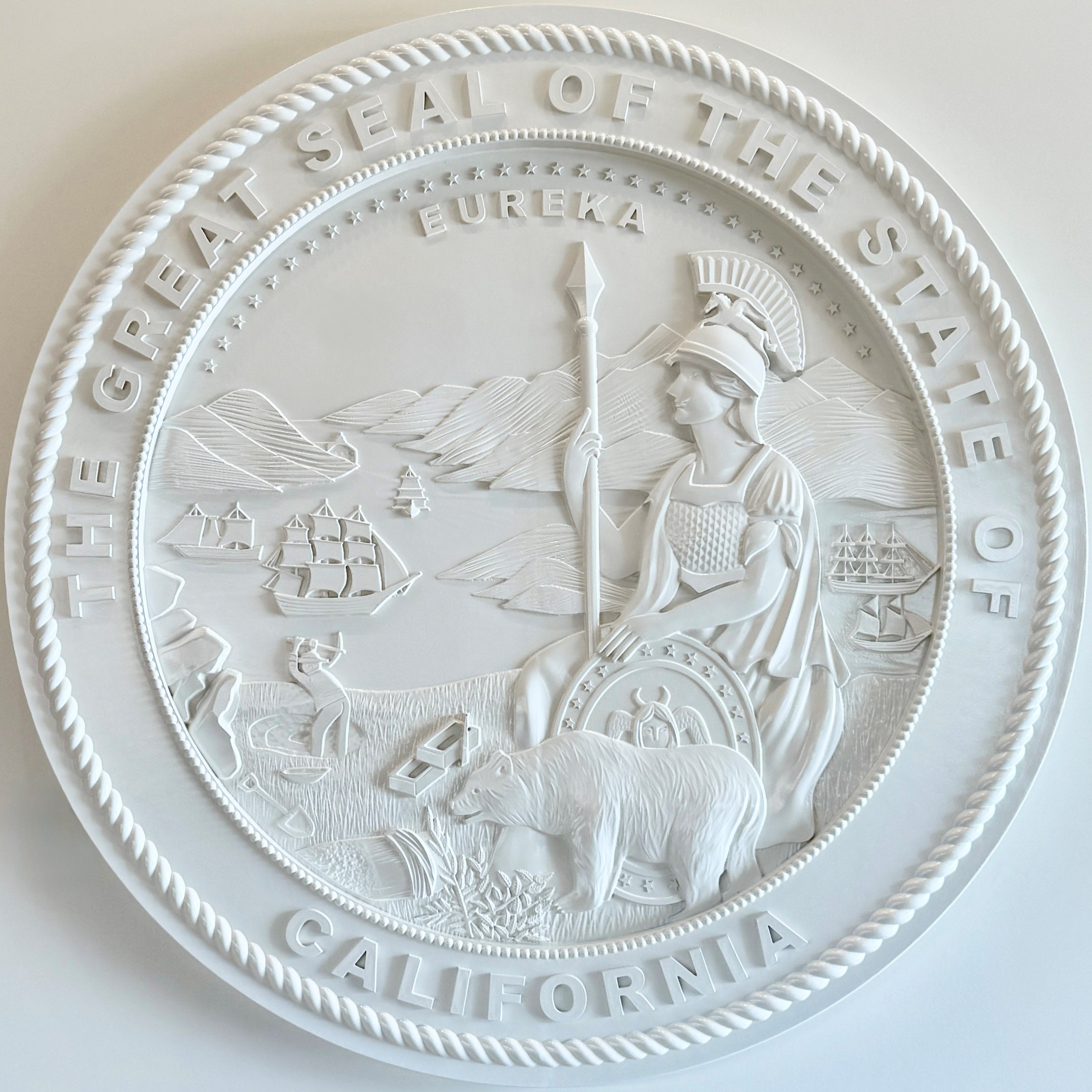
California State Seal located in the May Lee State Office Complex in Sacramento, California.

=== San Francisco Bay Area ===
It can also be seen in mosaic on the second floor of San Francisco's Ferry Building, which opened in 1898. Three unusual seals can be seen at the San Francisco Civic Center. The 1894 James Lick Pioneer Monument features a seal where Minerva and the bear have "escaped" the seal and are sculpted in the round, leaving the remaining elements on Minerva's shield in the space normally occupied only by the face of Medusa. So large that it was shipped via oyster shell barge from the artists' studio (a dairy barn) in Petaluma, a 1500-pound fiberglass seal hangs above the entrance to the California Public Utilities Commission building. A bright golden seal is on display in the auditorium of the Hiram Johnson State Building. There are two more, less spectacularly colored seals at the north and south entrances to that building. Joined by the seals of other western states, the seal of California hangs above one of the elevators in the lobby of the Hearst Building at Third and Market streets. A seal can also be found at Metropolitan Barber Shop, at 1018 Bush Street.

Around the Bay Area, other seals can be found at the Native Sons of the Golden West Parlor No. 62 in Napa (a six-foot wide stained glass), the historic plaza in Sonoma on the 1846 Bear Flag Revolt monument (1914), the Elihu M Harris State Office Building in Oakland, the San Mateo County History Museum in Redwood City (a mosaic dating to 1910), the Circle of Palms Plaza in San Jose, the site of California's first state capitol, and in front of Colton Hall in Monterey, the site of the 1849 Constitutional Convention. Nearby is a 1957 monument to Robert S. Garnett which includes the seal.

A selection of seals found around the San Francisco Bay Area

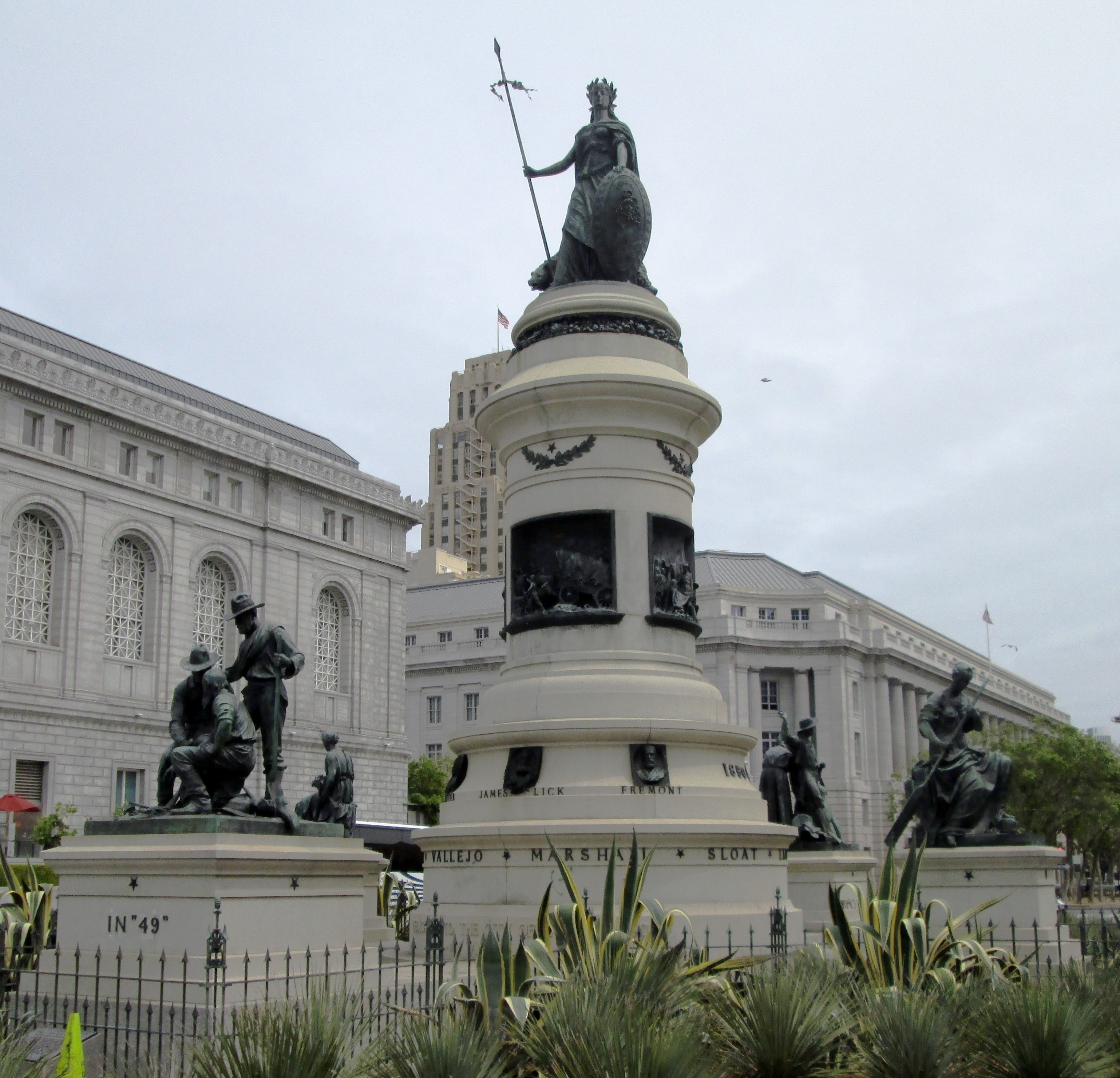
Minerva stands atop the James Lick Pioneer Monument in San Francisco

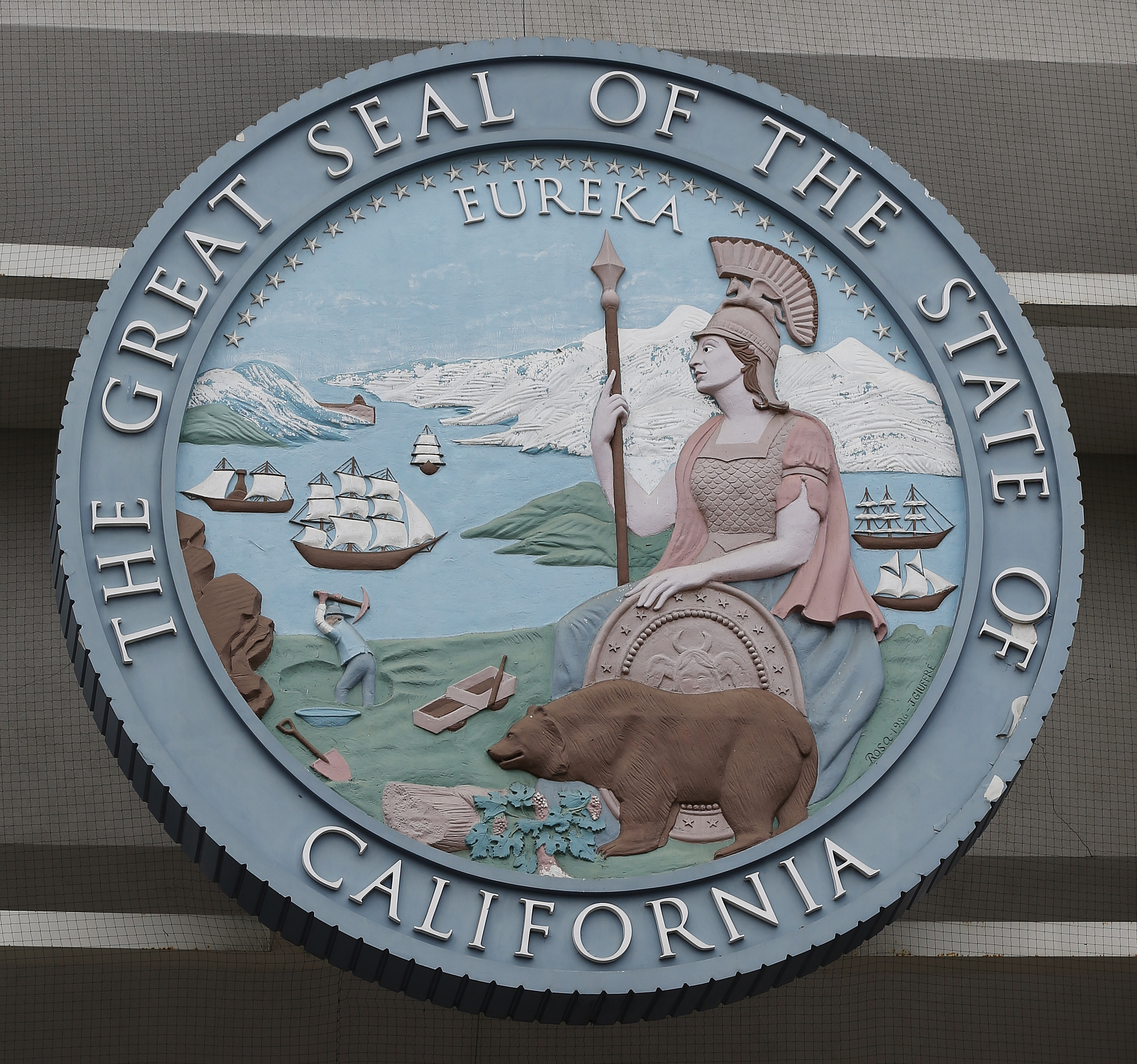
The very large seal at the CPUC building in San Francisco

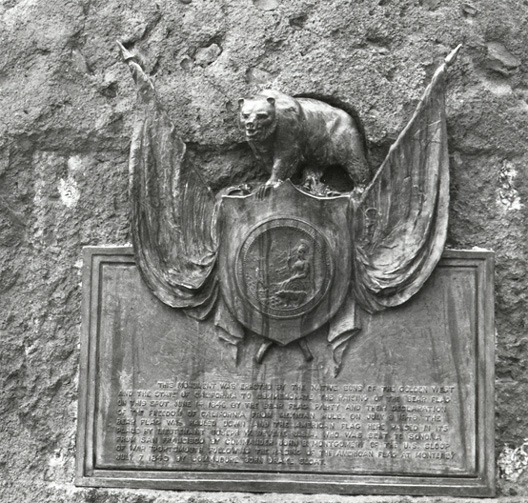
At the base of the 1846 Bear Flag Revolt monument in Sonoma

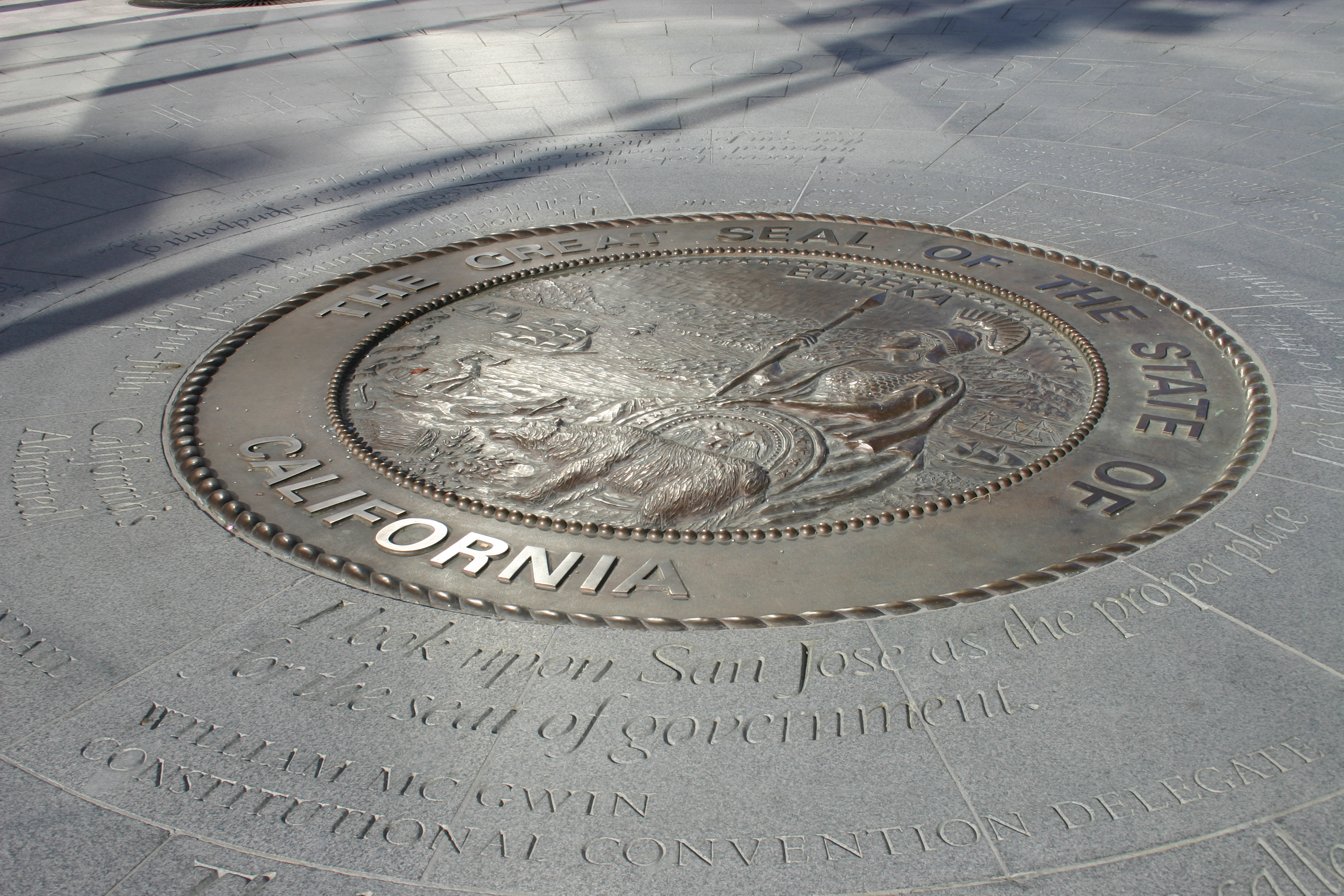
Seal at the Circle of Palms Plaza in San Jose

=== Southern California ===
A large bronze seal, installed in 1939, was for many years located in front of the First Street entrance to the old State Building in Los Angeles until the structure was torn down in the 1970s. The seal in the atrium of the Ronald Reagan State Building in Los Angeles is most likely this seal. Also in downtown Los Angeles, at the Los Angeles County Law Library, a large Seal of California is joined by others representing the various court districts of the area. At the 1934 California State Fair, Los Angeles-based Helms Bakery won the gold medal for the best loaf of bread, topping 471 other entries. Large reproductions of this medal, showing the seal on one side, can be seen on the exterior of all three former locations in Culver City, Montebello, and San Bernardino. As part of his 1932 mural on the ceiling of the Fluor Gallery of the Bowers Museum in Santa Ana, artist Martin Syvertsen included a seal. Another seal is attached to the Family Law Court in Riverside.

Above the bench in Courtroom #1 of the San Diego Superior Court hangs a stained glass seal. This was one of forty-two state seals created in 1889 (one for each state then in the Union) by artist John Mallon for the courthouse at the time and saved from oblivion in 1978 by civic-minded San Diegans (the courthouse had been torn down in 1959, and the seals placed in storage). Not far from the Superior Court, just outside the entrance doors to the old central library location at 850 E Street, is another seal. Constructed as part of the Panama–California Exposition, held in San Diego's Balboa Park from 1915 to 1917, the California Building features a stylized seal. A more standardized seal appears nearby, above the entrance to the San Diego Museum of Art. To celebrate the 1935–1936 California Pacific International Exposition, also held in Balboa Park, the United States Mint issued a commemorative half-dollar piece featuring a modified seal on the obverse. In 1907, the Native Daughters of the Golden West presented a large tablet to the officers and crew of the armored cruiser USS California (ACR-6). Both the commemorative coin and the tablet were designed by sculptor Robert Ingersoll Aitken, thus explaining the similarities among the two.

A selection of seals found around southern California

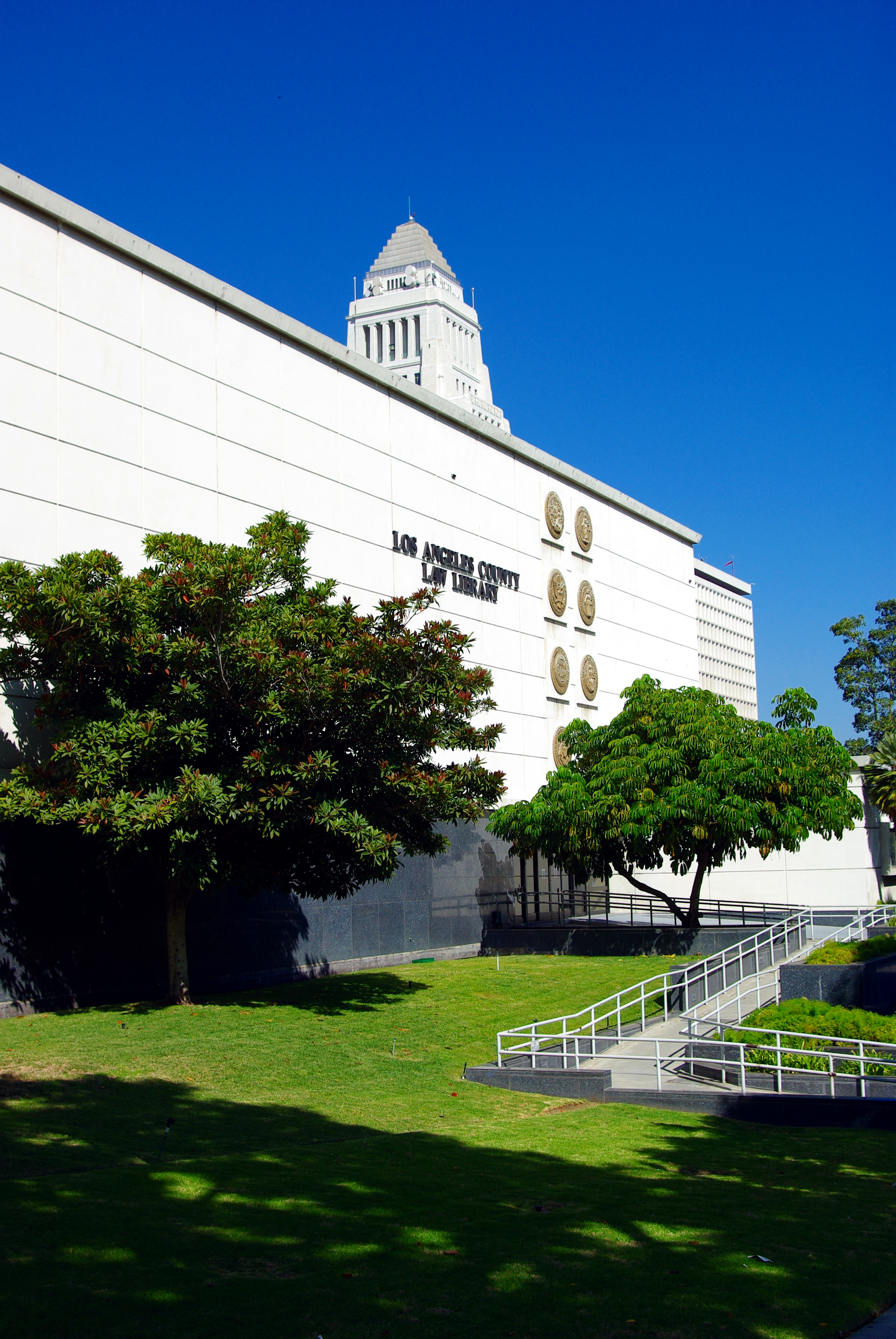
A state seal is featured among the six seen here at the Los Angeles County Law Library

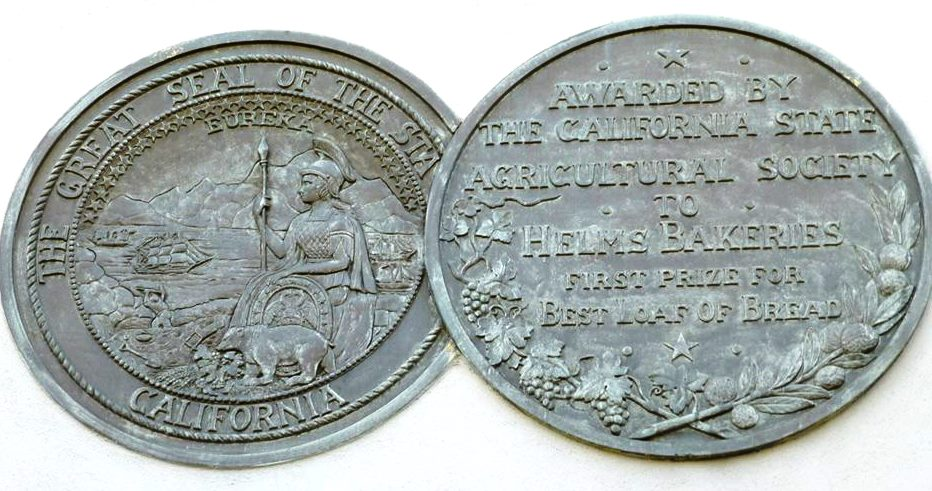
From the Helms Bakery building in Culver City

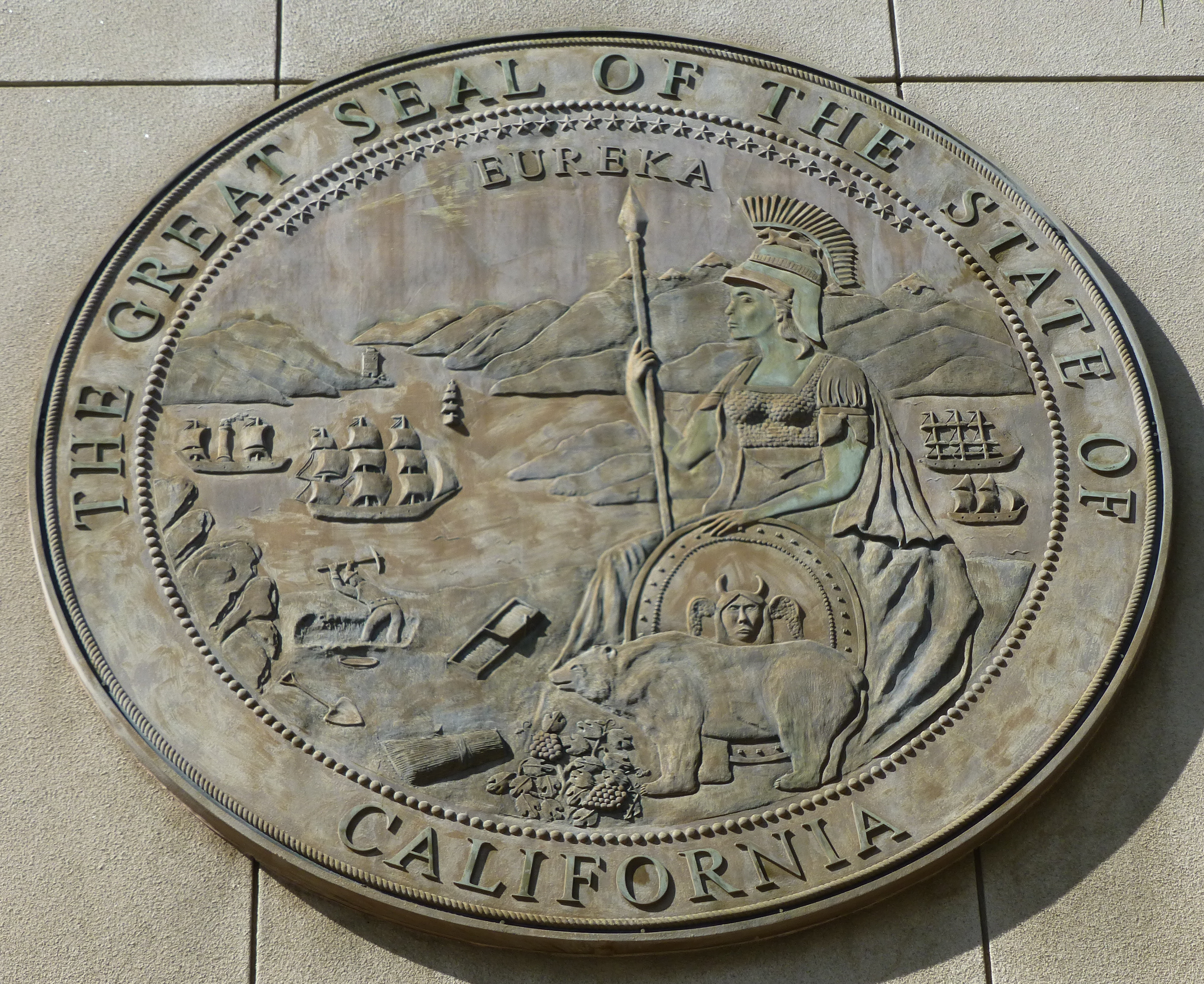
From the Family Law Court in downtown Riverside

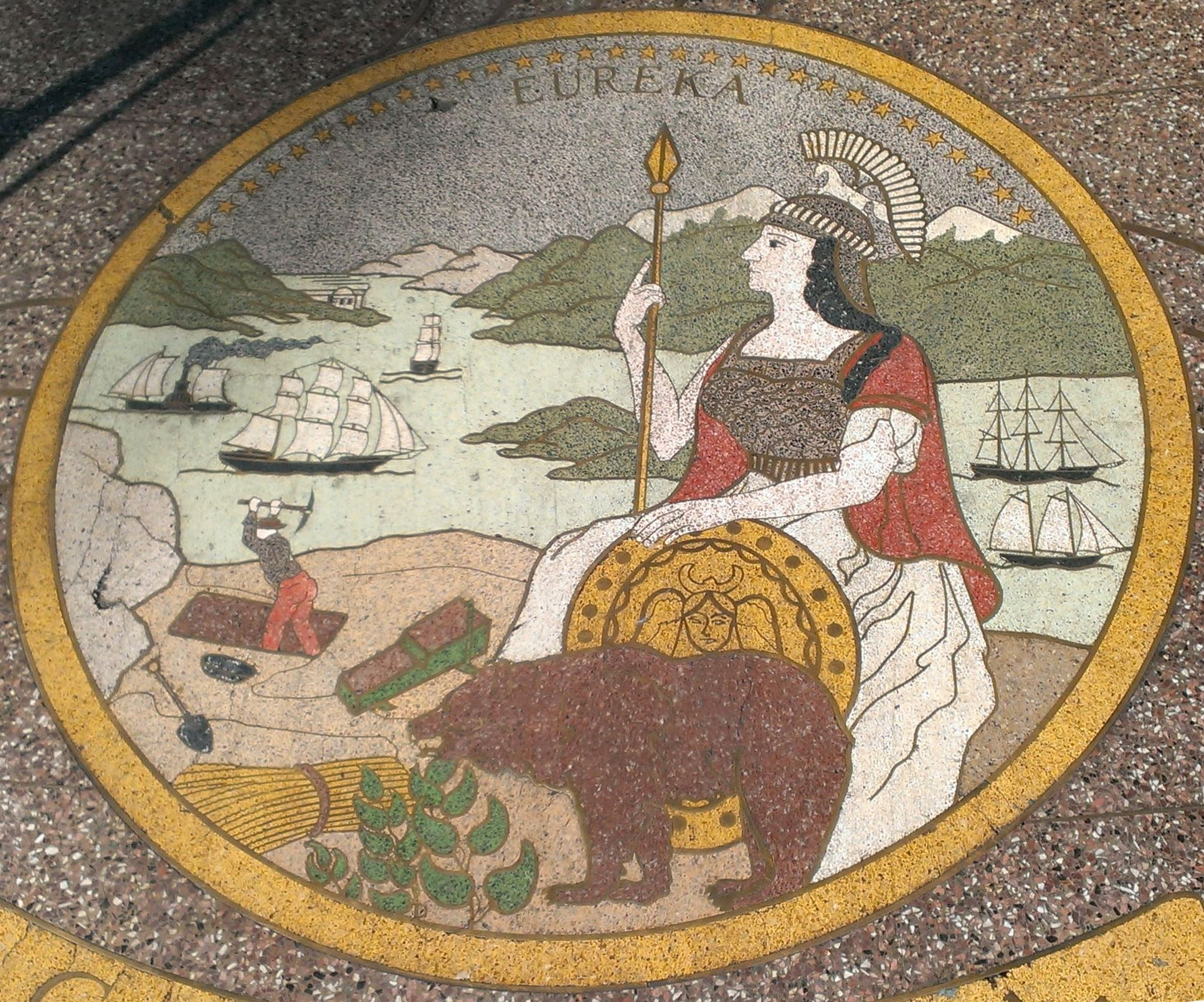
In front of the old San Diego Central Public Library

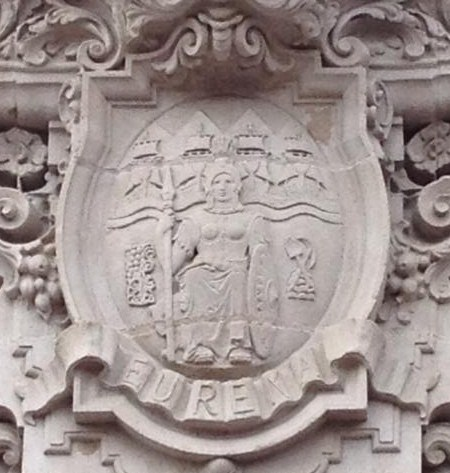
1915 seal on the California Building in Balboa Park, San Diego

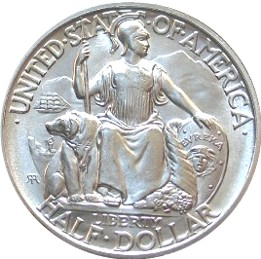
Obverse of 1936 California Pacific International Exposition Commemorative Half-Dollar

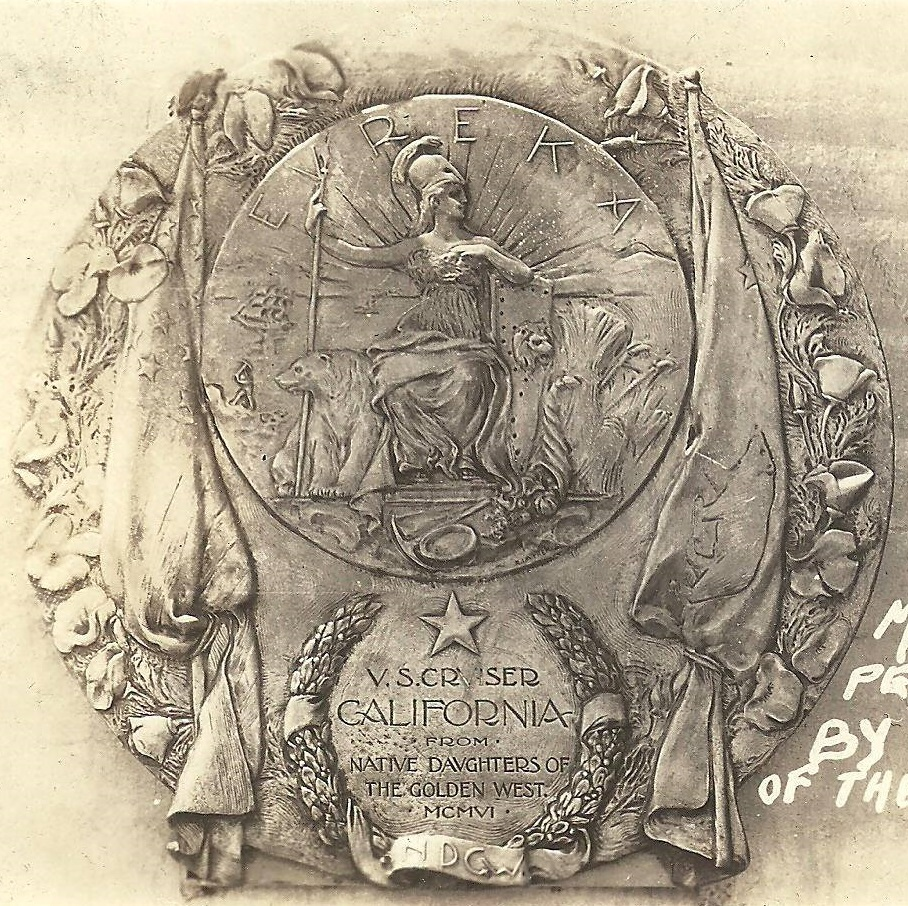
From a tablet presented to the cruiser California by the Native Daughters of the Golden West in 1907

=== Outside of California ===
Artistic renditions of the seals of the seven states of the Colorado River basin are included in the Oskar J.W. Hansen-designed dedication plaza at Hoover Dam. California's is in the center, directly below a large American bald eagle, and is the only seal with supporters: two California grizzly bears.

The historic Decatur House in Washington, D.C., once owned by prominent Californian Edward Fitzgerald Beale, features a seal, installed by Beale soon after he bought the house in 1871, made of twenty-two woods native to California. Although now in the collection of the California State Archives in Sacramento, an 1857 stained glass version of the seal, along with the seals of the several states, hung in an enormous iron skylight once located in the ceiling of the United States House of Representatives until a U.S. Capitol renovation in 1949. A similar collection of state seals, created by artist Herman T. Schladermundt in 1897, is on display in the main reading room of the Thomas Jefferson Building of the Library of Congress.

Along the north wall of the Memorial Building at the World War II Cambridge American Cemetery and Memorial, near Cambridge, England, are stained glass renditions of the state seals, including California's. A similar collection of seals is carved into the limestone floors of the temple area at the Manila American Cemetery and Memorial in the Philippines, established in 1948.

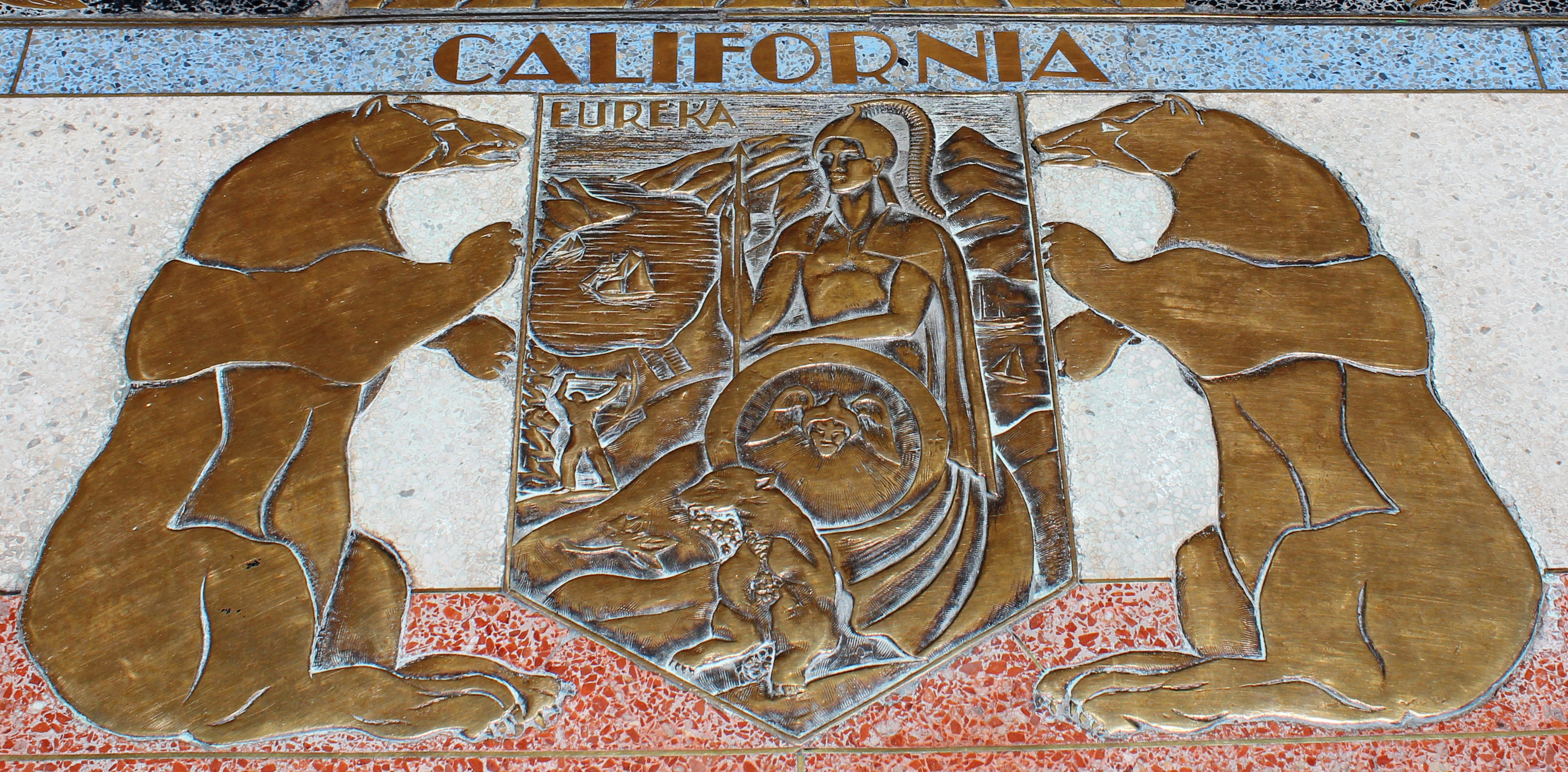
J.W. Hansen's artistic rendition of the seal at Hoover Dam's Dedication Plaza

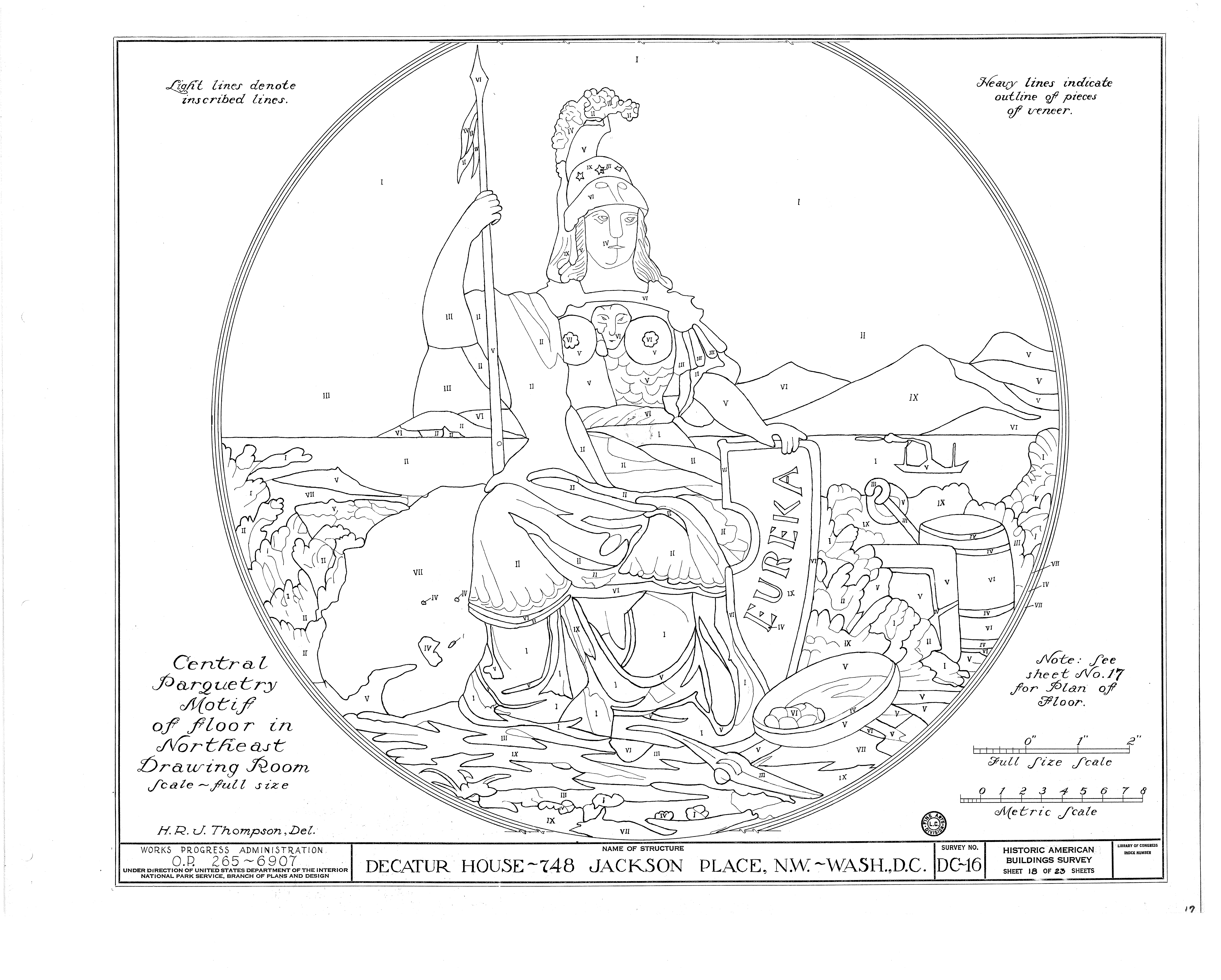
A blueprint of the seal in the Decatur House in Washington, D.C.

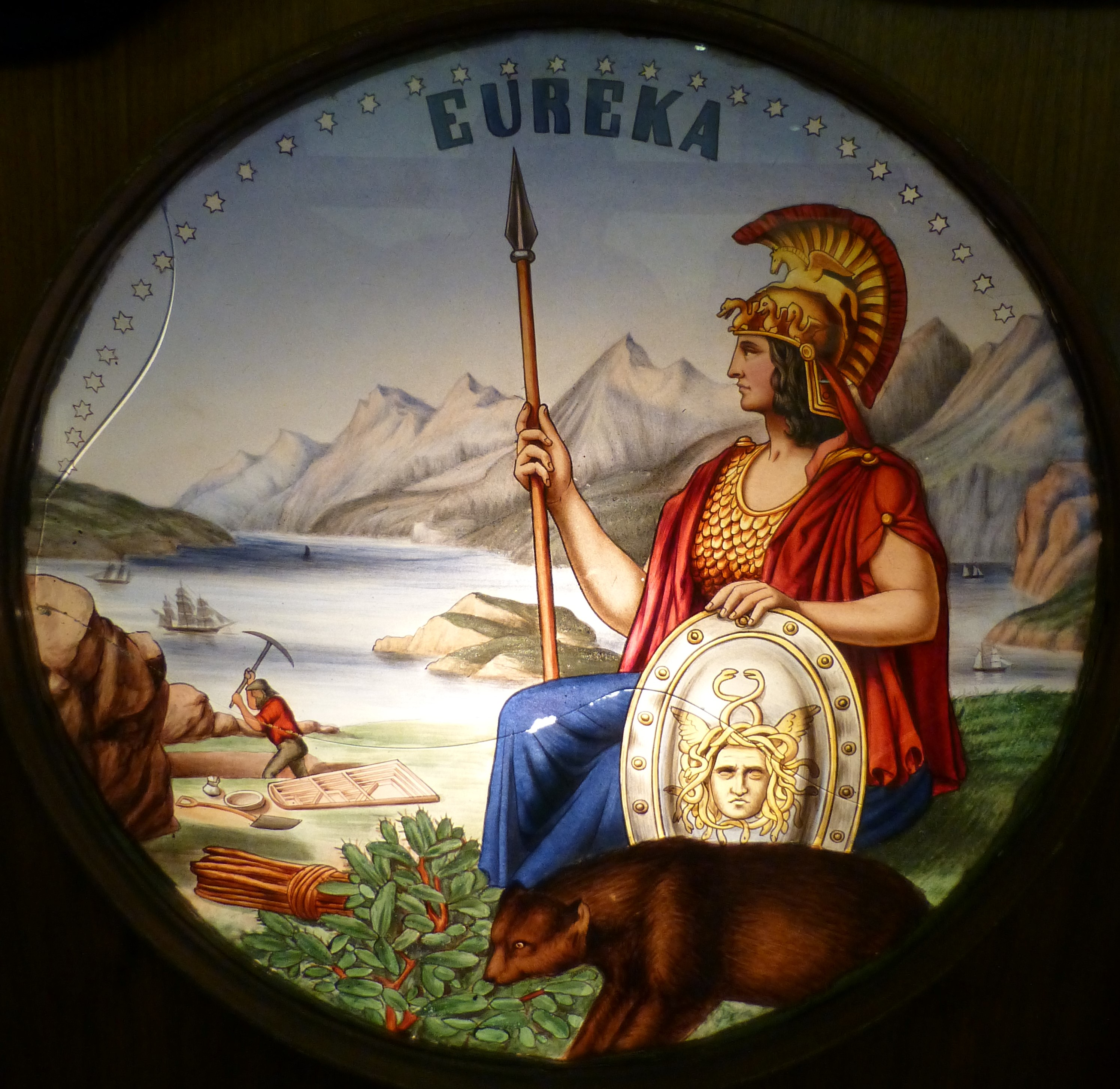
1857 seal once located in the ceiling of the U.S. House of Representatives

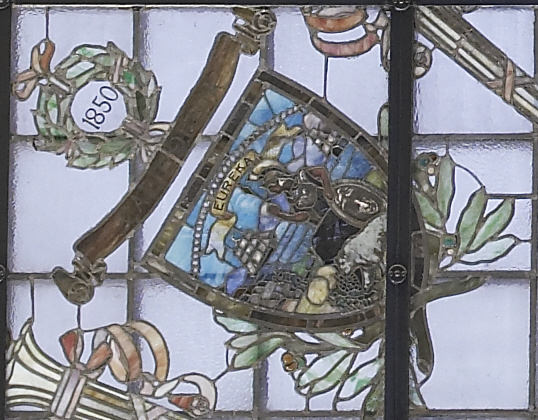
1897 seal in the Library of Congress

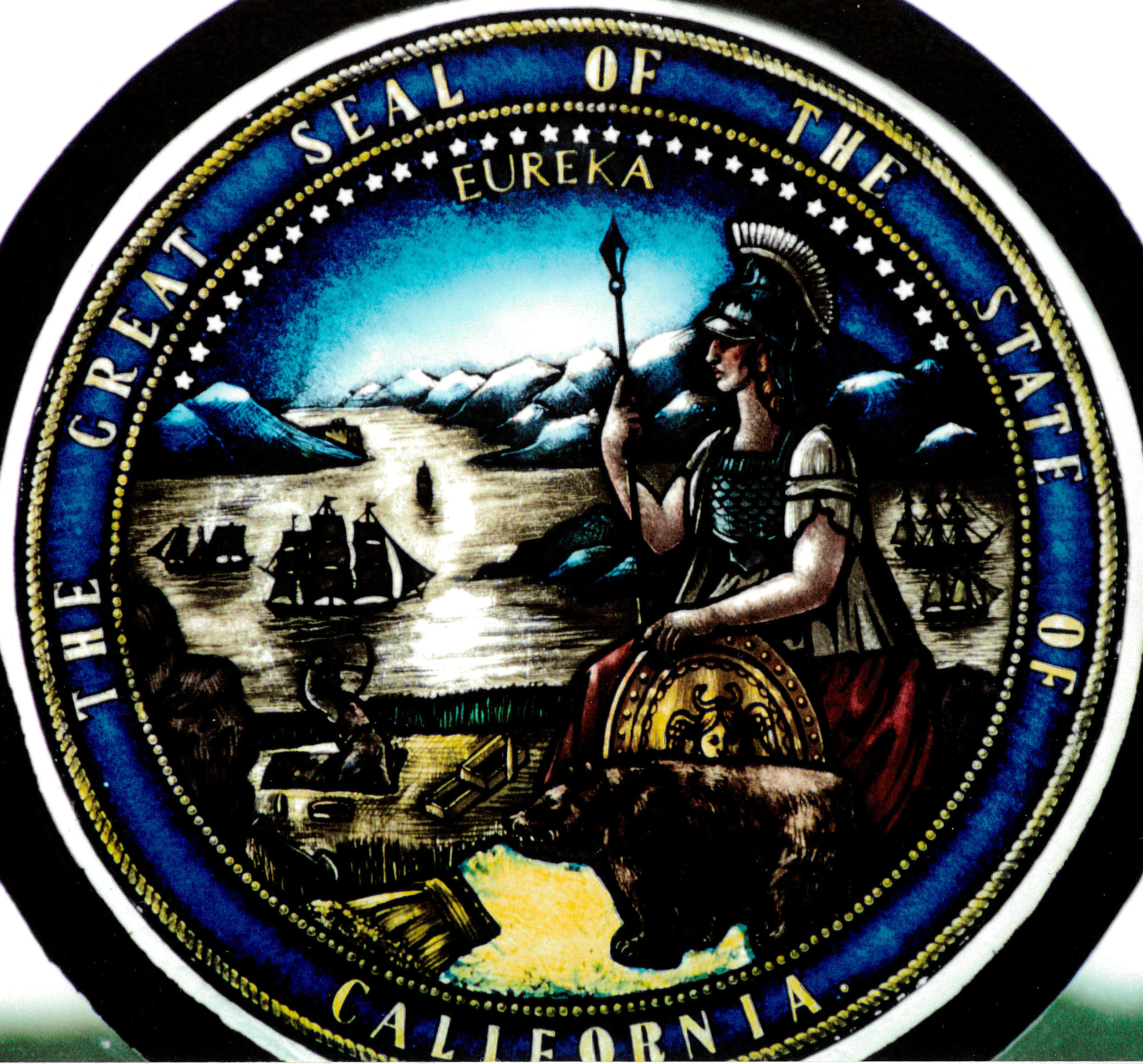
The seal in glass at the Cambridge American Cemetery and Memorial, England, U.K.

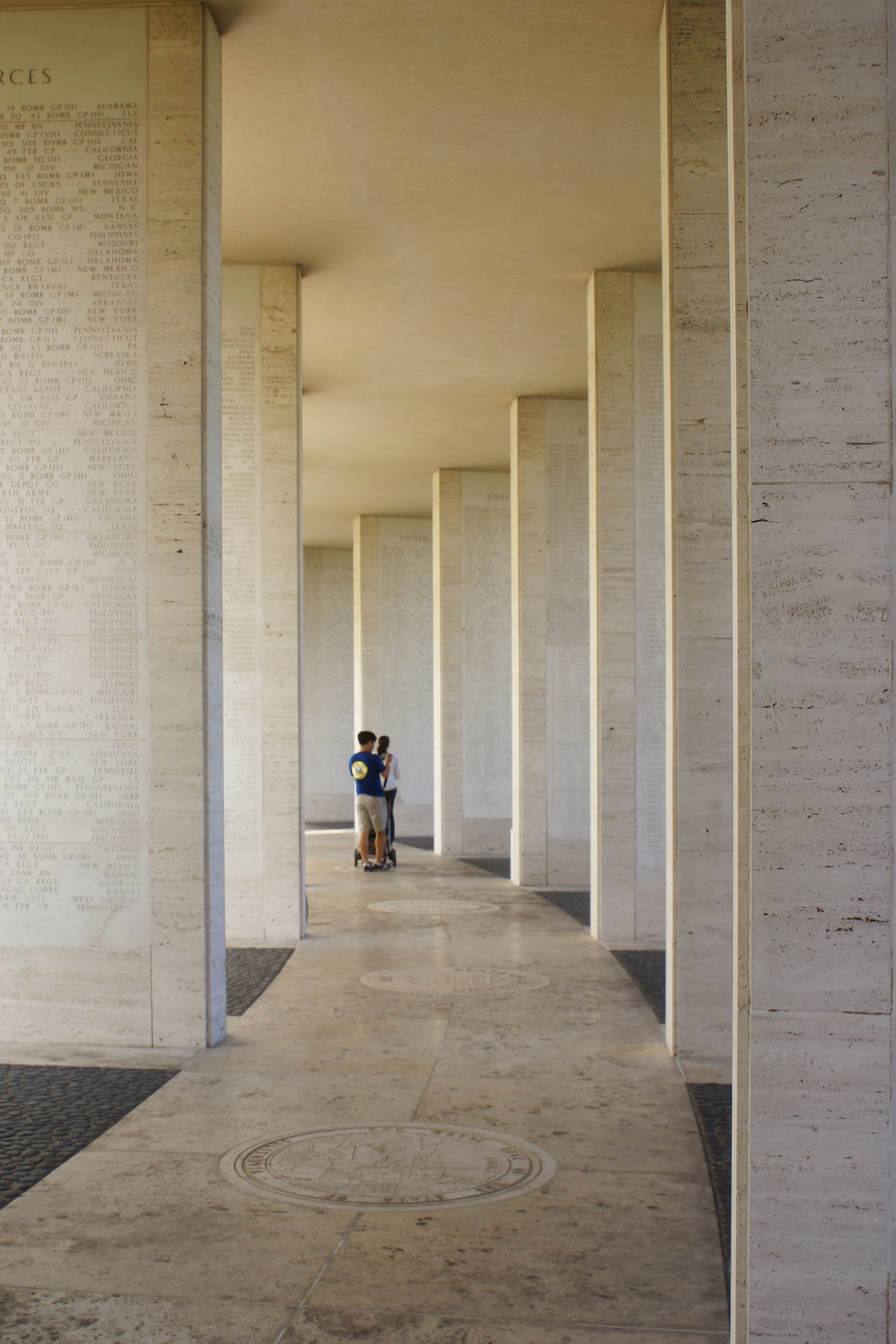
The seal can be seen carved into the floor of the temple area of the Manila American Cemetery and Memorial in the Philippines

== Other uses of the Seal ==
In 1862, the California Legislature created the California State Normal School (now San Jose State University), and bestowed its Great Seal upon the school. The university used that seal until 1996, when it adopted a different seal depicting its Tower Hall building. The city of Eureka, California, uses the same seal, being the only U.S. location to use the state seal as its seal. The city's name identically matches California's motto. Minerva and the bear appear on the seal of the city of Long Beach. The seal of the County of Alpine is nearly an exact copy of the state seal, but with most of the elements reversed, as if reflected in a mirror. The Governor's Flag features a modified seal at its center. The California Highway Patrol uses a modified state seal on its patch, replacing the wheat and grape vine with a cactus and adding a setting sun, and a seal as part of its shield that is nearly identical to the actual seal. Most state law enforcement agencies, along with many local and county agencies, display the state seal on their badges.

Because it is a misdemeanor to use any representation or facsimile of the Great Seal of the State of California for commercial purposes, Hollywood productions will often use a modified seal. A fictionalized version of the seal, missing the words "California" and "Eureka", appeared on officers' shoulder patches used for the television series Highway Patrol, which, although filmed in southern California, was set in an unnamed western state. Another made-for-television seal, missing the bear and several ships, and with a wandering island, was used for an episode of the CBS series The Mentalist. Above Judge Wright's head in the NBC comedy Bad Judge hung an altered seal, missing the ships and a good number of stars. During Mr. Peanutbutter's gubernatorial run on the Netflix series BoJack Horseman, a seal with an actual seal in place of Minerva was shown. In the 2016 FX production The People v. O. J. Simpson: American Crime Story, a twenty-seven star seal hung above the head of Judge Lance Ito.

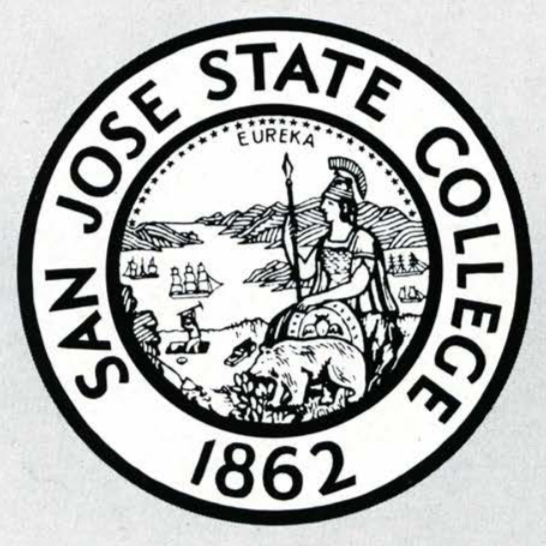
San Jose State University's seal, used until 1996

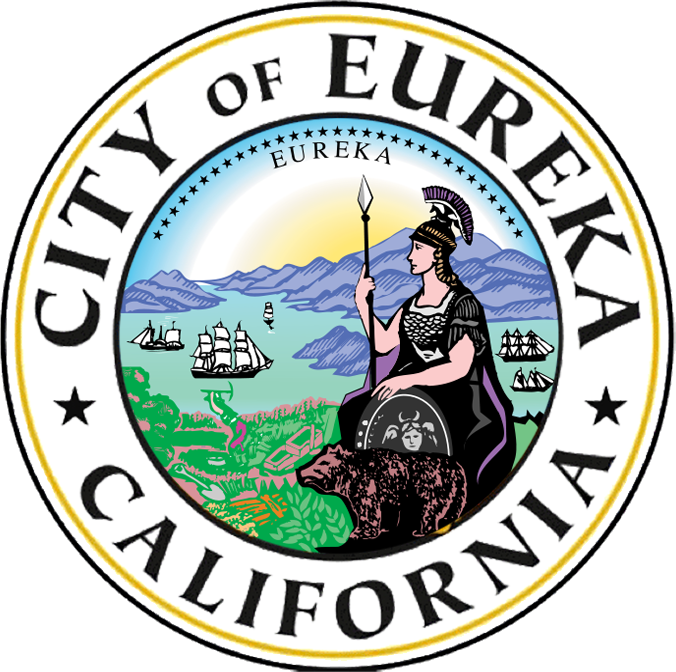
Seal of the City of Eureka

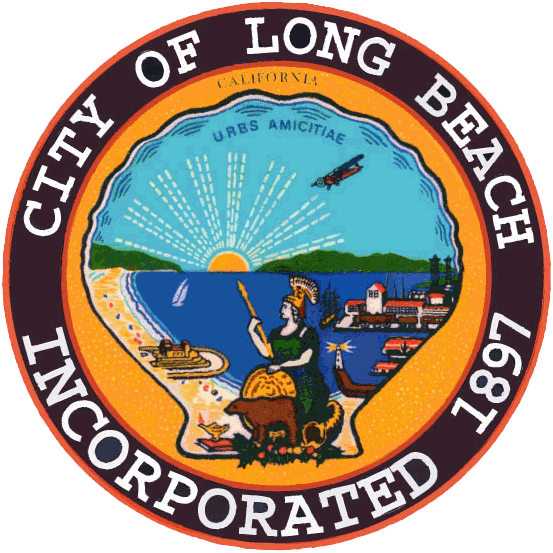
Seal of the City of Long Beach

Seal of the County of Alpine

The California State Governor's Flag

CHP Shield

In 1969, the appearance of the seal on state-owned cars parked in unexpected places was used by concerned Californians to identify public vehicles, financed by taxpayers, being used for non-official duties. Observed examples included a vehicle parked at a Lake Tahoe casino and "a man, woman, and several children piling out of a state owned car and into a movie theatre at 3 p.m."

As the "signature" of California, the seal has also been used for less-than-solemn purposes, including poking fun at the state's problems. In 1967, soon after Ronald Reagan's inauguration as governor, the Sacramento Bee ran an editorial cartoon showing an overweight Minerva and bear, representing bloated state government, doing toe-touching exercises as Reagan, dressed as an athletics coach, calls out, "Squeeze, Cut, Trim – Squeeze, Cut, Trim." In 2001, the Oakland Tribune printed a letter to the editor with a light-hearted suggestion of new imagery for the seal. The writer proposed replacing the sailing ships with Japanese car carriers, the wheat and grape vine with Central Valley subdivisions, obscuring the Sierra Nevada with smog, and giving California a new motto more appropriate for the time: "I have lost it." Ross Mayfield, political cartoonist of the Santa Maria Sun, lampooned California's economic situation with his "The New State Seal for the Great Bankrupt State of California" cartoon, which portrayed a worried Minerva holding signs that read "Send Money" and "Need Cash," the miner in his (literal and figurative) hole with a "We're In Too Deep" sign, and the ships flying "Bail Us Out" and "We're Sinking" banners. A version of the seal with Conan the Barbarian in the place of Minerva and California spelled phonetically as 'Kahlifoania' made the rounds soon after Austrian-born Arnold Schwarzenegger was elected governor in 2003.

== Government seals of California ==
Seal of the governor of California

Seal of the California State Assembly

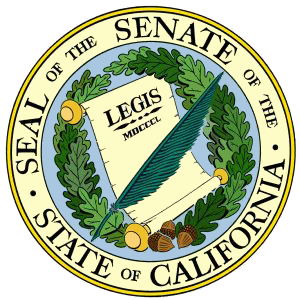
Seal of the California State Senate

Seal of the California state controller

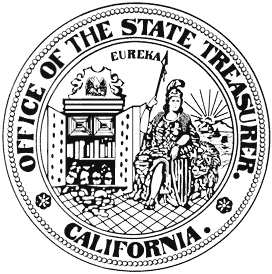
Seal of the California state treasurer

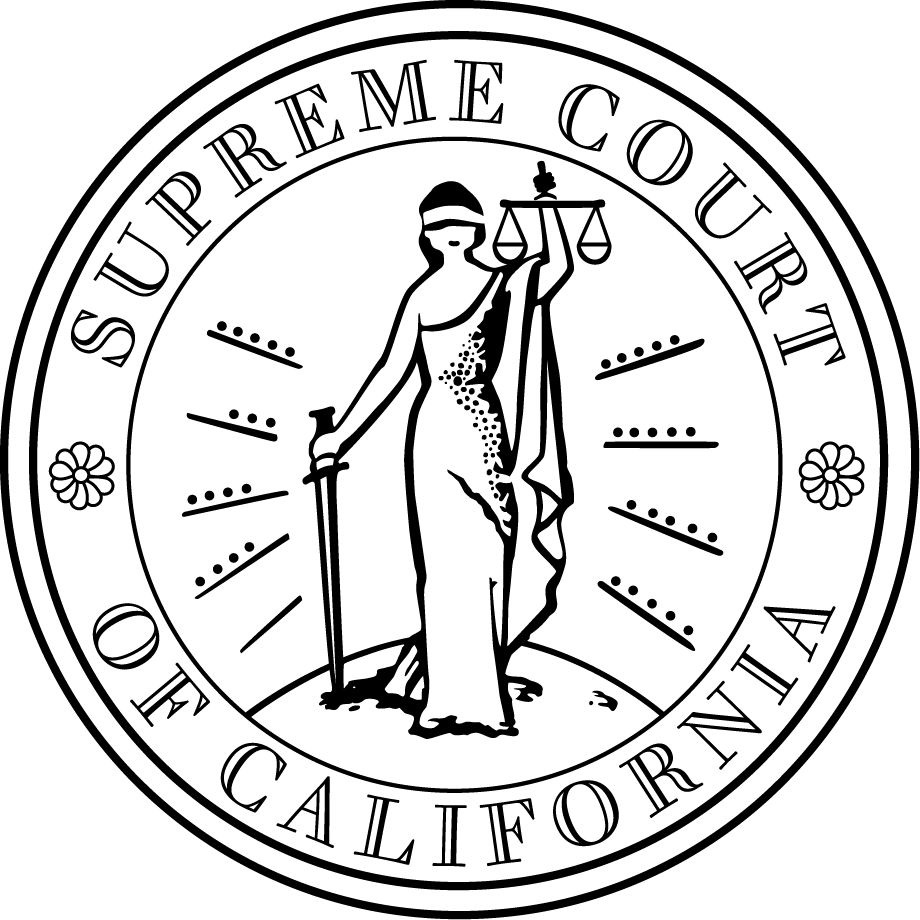
Seal of the Supreme Court of California

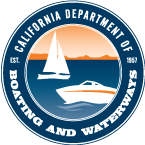
Seal of the California Department of Boating and Waterways

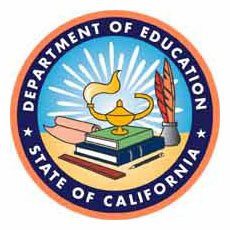
Seal of the California Department of Education

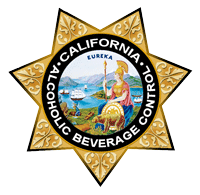
Seal of the California Department of Alcoholic Beverage Control

Seal of the California Department of Parks and Recreation
