= Heinlenville =

Heinlenville 海因倫鎮
- Neighborhood of San Jose
- Etymology: John Heinlen
- Interactive map of Heinlenville
- Coordinates: 37°21′5″N 121°53′38″W
- Country: United States
- State: California
- County: Santa Clara
- City: San Jose
- Built: 1887–1888
- Demolished: 1931
- Founder: John Heinlen

Area
  - Total: 5.3 acres (2.1 ha)

Population
  - Total: 4,000
  - Density: 480,000/sq mi (190,000/km^{2})

Heinlenville (Chinese: 海因倫鎮; also called the Sixth Street Chinatown 六街唐人埠 and San Jose Chinatown 散那些唐人埠) was a Chinese-American ethnic enclave in San Jose, California. Established in 1887 and demolished in 1931, it was the last and longest-lasting of San Jose's five Chinatowns.

== Namesake ==
Heinlenville was nicknamed after John Heinlen, a German-American rancher who leased land to the Chinese community for a settlement in an era when they were prohibited from owning land outright. Heinlen was born in 1815 in Germany, immigrated to the United States in 1817, and lived in Pennsylvania and Bucyrus, Ohio, before moving to California in 1852. He employed many Chinese Americans on his Coyote ranch and leased land to Chinese farmers in Kings and Fresno counties. He also had good business relations with Chinese merchants in San Jose. There is speculation that his goodwill towards Chinese Americans was motivated by the anti-German sentiment he had witnessed while living in Ohio. In 2019, his name was one of seven contenders in the renaming of Burnett Middle School in San Jose.

== Establishment ==
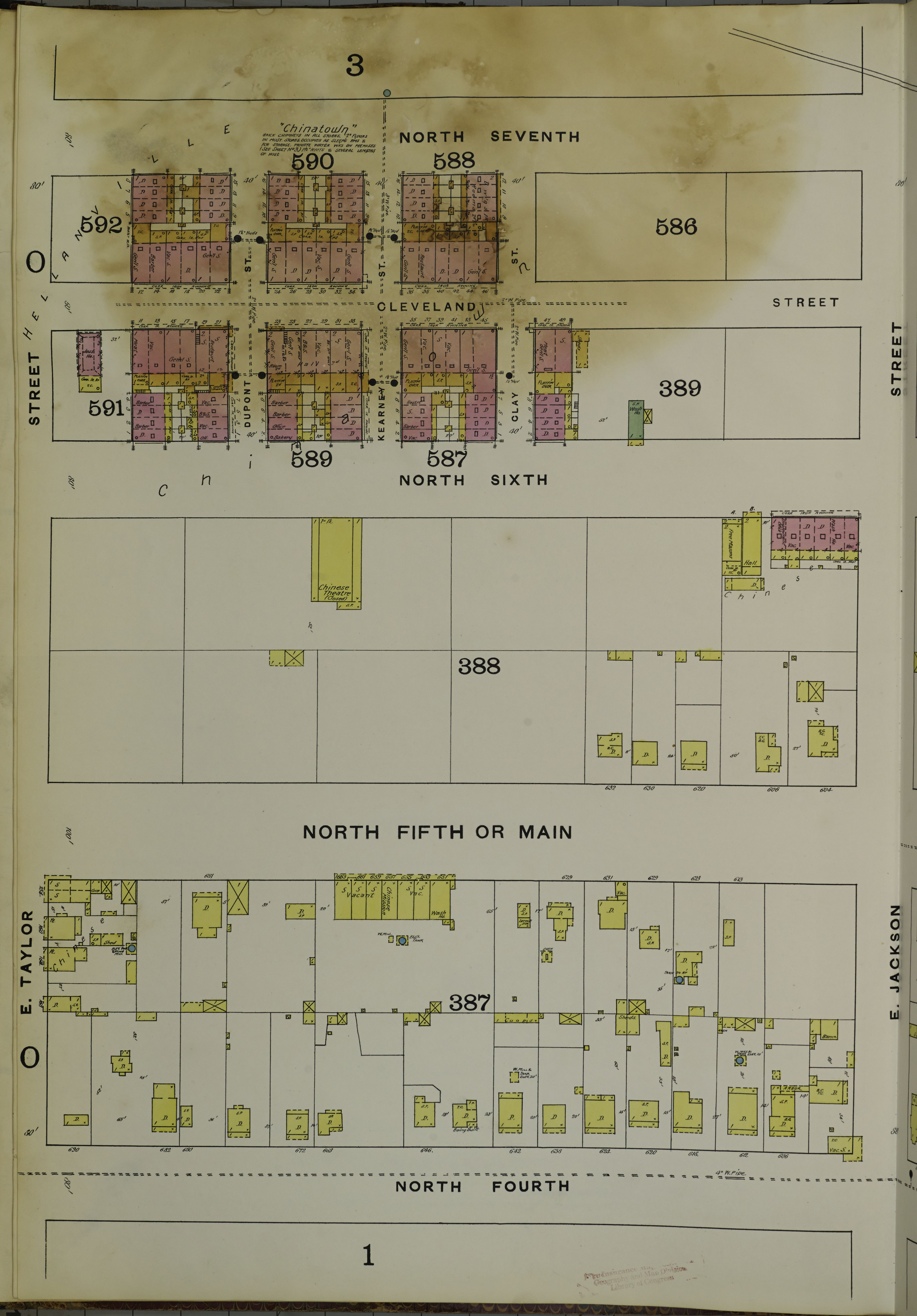
1891 Sanborn map of Heinlenville and what would later become Japantown

In 1887, ten days after the Market Street Chinatown was destroyed by arson, John Heinlen began planning a new home for the city's Chinese residents on a 5-acre (2.0 ha) pasture he owned near the affluent Hensley neighborhood. Heinlen commissioned architect Theodore Lenzen to design a new neighborhood for the Chinese residents. Lenzen was a fellow German immigrant who had designed a City Hall then under construction, as well as other local landmarks.

Heinlen signed contracts with Chinese merchants on June 20 and July 14, 1887. The city rejected his application for a building permit, but his son Goethe successfully fought the injunction on his father's behalf. White neighbors, concerned about their property values, ostracized Heinlen and made threats on his life. Heinlen completed construction in 1888. The neighborhood was mocked as "Heinlenville" and its benefactor as "Ah Heinlen", but eventually the name Heinlenville stuck and was used by its residents.

The property was divided into six blocks bounded by Sixth and Seventh streets. The interior streets were named after thoroughfares in San Francisco's Chinatown (although ironically Kearny was misspelled "Kearney", as in Denis Kearney, who had once incited San Jose's whites against the Chinese). The buildings were made of arson-proof brick and had running water. To protect residents against attacks, a tall wooden fence was erected around the neighborhood and topped with barbed wire. Heinlen hired white guards to lock up perimeter gates and patrol the neighborhood at night. White agitators would damage the fence, necessitating repairs.

Inside the compound, Chinese residents were served by a variety of merchants, barbers, traditional doctors, Chinese herbalists, and a Taoist temple, the Ng Shing Gung (Chinese: 五聖宮), which also housed a Chinese school. Most residents spoke Taishanese.

== Growth ==
Heinlenville became a first stop for many Chinese migrants to the Santa Clara Valley. It also drew Japanese migrants to the area, giving rise to a Japantown on Sixth Street that eventually expanded to the west. At its peak, Heinlenville had a population of 4,000, making it the largest Chinese community in the United States outside of San Francisco. Heinlenville coexisted with the Woolen Mills Chinatown for several years. Newspapers played up a rivalry between the two settlements. The city wanted the Heinlenville enterprise to fail so that the Chinese population would move to Woolen Mills, but the reverse happened in 1902.

After John Heinlen died in December 1903, his children succeeded him in running the Heinlen Company, going door to door to collect rent. Heinlenville sustained damage in the 1906 San Francisco earthquake but was not destroyed like the San Francisco Chinatown. Merchants quickly rebuilt and expanded their shops, benefiting from a booming local agricultural industry.

== Administration ==
Residents were governed by merchant elders, district associations, and tongs. The Sze Yup, Sam Yup, and Yeung Wo (Heungsan) associations, which were affiliates of the Chinese Six Companies, drew members based on their home regions in China, while the Chee Kong Tong operated at large. The Hop Sing Tong and Hip Sing Tong both ran gambling houses in Heinlenville and fought a series of bloody "tong wars" until 1923.

== Relations with other ethnic groups ==
While white neighbors rarely visited the enclave, its restaurants were popular with Japanese families on weekends, and African Americans rented rooms in Chinese-run boarding houses there. During the First and Second Sino-Japanese Wars, Chinese and Japanese residents maintained cordial relations, on the basis that it was their ancestral homelands who were at war, rather than San Jose neighbors. Relations with the surrounding Little Italy neighborhood are also thought to have been amicable, largely because children left the enclave to attend racially integrated San Jose City Schools, unlike in other California cities.

== Decline and destruction ==
Heinlenville declined in the 1920s as younger generations sought careers in business or manufacturing, rather than shopkeeping or gambling, or sought better housing outside the aging enclave. The steady stream of new Chinese immigrants had already slowed due to the 1882 Chinese Exclusion Act and 1892 Geary Act. By the early 1930s, the Santa Clara Valley's Chinese population had dwindled to less than 1,000 people. In 1931, during the Great Depression, the Heinlen Company declared bankruptcy and sold its Heinlenville land to the city. Most remaining residents moved to Japantown. The city razed the entire neighborhood, except for the Ng Shing Gung building, to make way for a municipal corporation yard.

The Hip Sing Tong sued to stop the city's planned demolition of the Ng Shing Gung. In December 1941, the city put the temple building up for auction. After outcry from the Chinese community and local newspapers, the city agreed to turn the building over to a Chinese organization for maintenance. However, by 1945, it had fallen into disrepair. Despite efforts by historian Clyde Arbuckle to save the building, it was dismantled in May 1949, with its façade, altars, and furnishings kept in storage.

== Legacy ==
Three buildings considered part of Heinlenville remain standing across Sixth Street from the former Heinlen property. These buildings have served the Chinese, Japanese, and Filipino communities at various times. In 1991, the Ng Shing Gung temple was reconstructed in History Park in San Jose and is now the Chinese American Historical Museum, which contains artifacts from Heinlenville.

In 2006, the city closed its corporation yard, consolidating operations at a new Central Service Yard next to Municipal Stadium. In March 2008, the Anthropological Studies Center at Sonoma State University partnered with the Redevelopment Agency of San Jose to conduct an archaeological excavation of the former Heinlenville site.

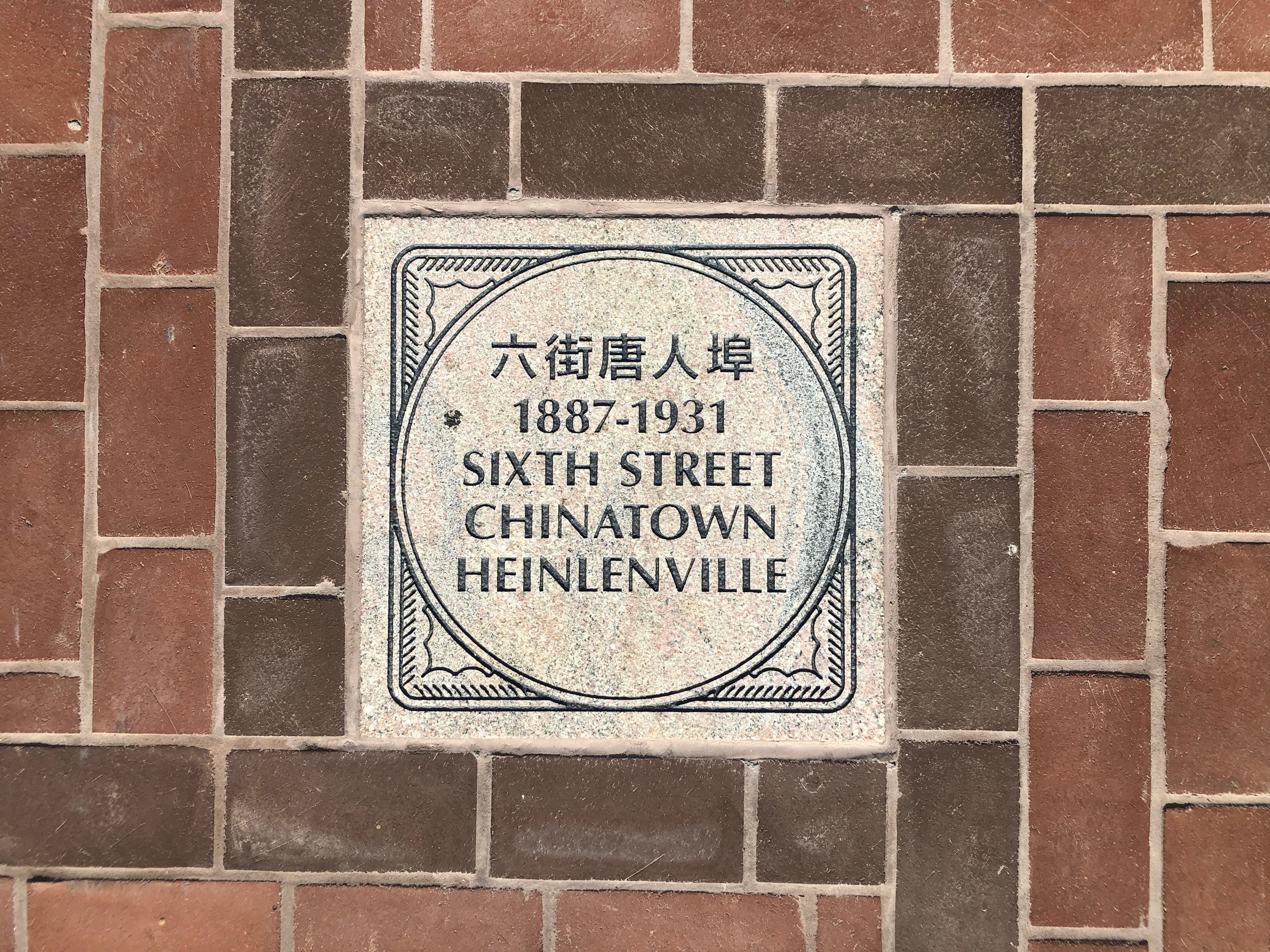
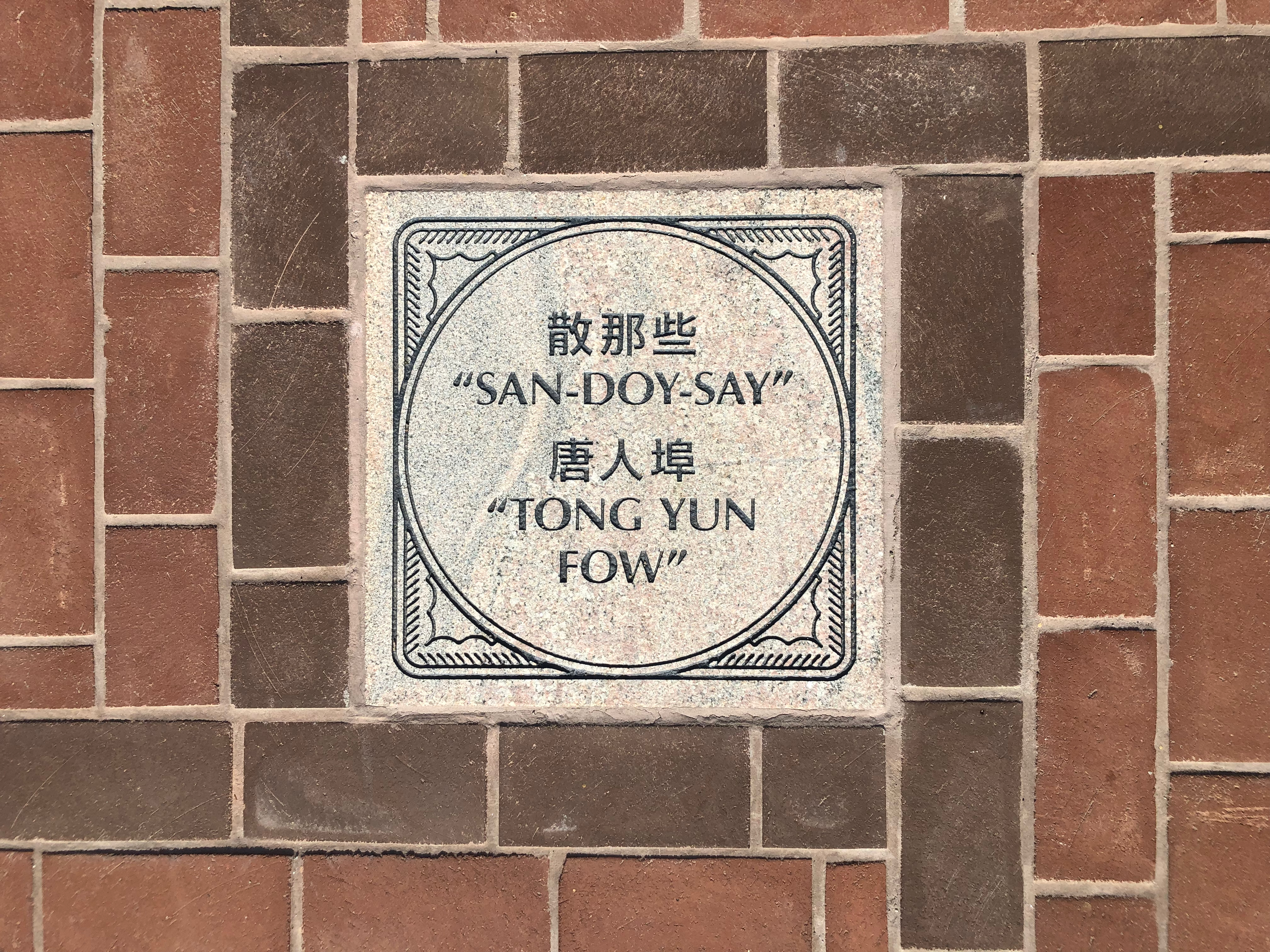
Bilingual plaques at Heinlenville Park commemorate Heinlenville and other San Jose Chinatowns.

In 2012, the San Jose Public Art Program partnered with Rasteroids Design on the Japantown Mural Project, which adorned the former corporation yard's perimeter fence with murals from local artists. Murals included references to Heinlenville. In 2017, the city sold the corporation yard property to Shea Properties and Ivanhoé Cambridge to redevelop 3.8 acres (1.5 ha) of it into an apartment complex. The remainder of the property was to be developed into a park and arts center. In 2020, the San Jose City Council chose to name the park after Heinlen instead of "Sakura". On October 10, 2023, Mayor Matt Mahan dedicated Heinlenville Park with a few hundred people in attendance. The hardscape park provides space for community events and features artwork and plaques to honor both the Chinese community and Heinlen's benevolence.

In 2026, the San Jose City Council approved a plan for a Bill Kee Park in southwestern San Jose. Kee led the 1945 effort to spare the Ng Shing Gung temple from demolition.

== Notable residents ==
- Lau Sing Kee – decorated World War I army veteran convicted for helping immigrants evade discriminatory immigration laws
- John C. Young – decorated World War II army veteran and cofounder of the Chinese Historical Society of America

== See also ==
- Chinatowns in San Jose, California
- Japantown, San Jose
