= Chinatowns in San Jose, California =

Former neighborhoods of San Jose, California

During the 19th century and early 20th century, San Jose, California, was home to a large Chinese-American community that was centered around the Santa Clara Valley's agricultural industry. Due to anti-Chinese sentiment and official discrimination, Chinese immigrants and their descendants lived in a succession of five Chinatowns from the 1860s to the 1930s:

- First Market Street Chinatown (1866–1870)
- Vine Street Chinatown (1870–1872)
- Second Market Street Chinatown, also known as Plaza Chinatown (1872–1887)
- Woolen Mills Chinatown (1887–1902)
- Heinlenville, also known as the Sixth Street Chinatown (1887–1931)

Of these enclaves, the two largest were the Second Market Street Chinatown and Heinlenville.

== Market and Vine Street Chinatowns ==
San Jose's first Chinatown was located at the southwest corner of Market and San Fernando streets, near the present-day Circle of Palms Plaza. City officials noted the Chinese presence by 1866. By January 1870, white residents had begun complaining to the San Jose City Council about the concentration of Chinese people in the neighborhood. A couple weeks later, Chinatown burned to the ground while the San Jose Fire Department did little to save it.

Within weeks, the New Chinatown Land Association leased 4 acres (1.6 ha) on Vine Street, near the Guadalupe River. The 1870 census recorded 454 residents in the Vine Street Chinatown. The city's first Chinese temple, or joss house, was later built there. Meanwhile, in March 1870, a wealthy Chinese businessman from San Francisco secured a ten-year lease of the original Market Street Chinatown's land. Pressure from Vine Street neighbors convinced some Chinese to return to Market Street. Severe flooding on the Guadalupe during the winter of 1871 to 1872 brought the short-lived Vine Street Chinatown to an end.

The second Market Street Chinatown grew to about 1,400 people by 1876. By 1884, it occupied most of the block along Market Plaza between San Fernando and San Antonio streets. On March 24, 1887, the city council declared Chinatown a public nuisance and discussed options for legally removing the community from the city's center. On May 4, Chinatown burned to the ground in an intense arson fire while white residents looked on. Local newspapers cheered the neighborhood's destruction. The next day, the city council approved funding for a new San Jose City Hall on the plaza directly across from the former Chinatown, stipulating that no Chinese labor be used in its construction. The Market Street Chinatown's inhabitants temporarily resided at San Fernando and Vine streets before moving on to the Woolen Mills Chinatown and Heinlenville, both north of the city.

In the 1980s, the Redevelopment Agency of San Jose funded an archaeological excavation as part of the urban renewal project. Stanford University researchers began cataloguing the artifacts in 2002. On September 28, 2021, the city formally apologized for its past discrimination against the Chinese community, including its role in the 1887 fire.

== Woolen Mills Chinatown ==
After the fire, the Chinese community moved to two sites north of the city center. One of these sites was located on land leased from L. M. Hoeffler near the San Jose Woolen Manufacturing Company at Taylor and First streets. Two prominent figures in the Chinese community, Ng Fook and Chin Shin, raised the funds necessary to build the settlement, including the expensive sewer hookups demanded by the city. It went by various names, including Woolen Mills Chinatown, Big Jim's Chinatown, Taylor Street Chinatown, and Phillipsville. Unlike other Chinatowns in San Jose, Woolen Mills was mainly home to factory and farm laborers and was not known for its affluence. It peaked at a size of 15 blocks, which included the Garden City Cannery and, unusually, a Chinese theater and two joss houses in close proximity.

Ng Fook died in 1888, and Chin Shin returned to China not long after. After the cannery closed, most of the buildings were converted into a laundry or abandoned. Most residents left for Heinlenville by 1901. The neighborhood was destroyed in a fire the following year. In 1999, the California Department of Transportation partnered with the Chinese Historical and Cultural Project to perform an archaeological excavation of the site as part of the completion of Guadalupe Freeway.

== Heinlenville ==
Days after the burning of the Market Street Chinatown in 1887, John Heinlen began planning a new home for the city's Chinese residents on a 5-acre (2.0 ha) pasture he owned near the affluent Hensley neighborhood. He persisted despite the city denying building permits and white residents threatening to ostracize him and making threats on his life. Heinlen signed contracts with Chinese merchants on June 20 and July 14, 1887, and the neighborhood was completed in 1888.

Heinlenville contained a variety of merchants, barbers, traditional doctors, Chinese herbalists, and a Taoist temple, the Ng Shing Gung (Chinese: 五聖宮). Heinlenville became a first stop for many Chinese migrants to the Santa Clara Valley. It also drew Japanese migrants to the area, giving rise to a Japantown on Sixth Street. At its peak, Heinlenville had a population of 4,000, more than any other Chinatown in the city's history. After John Heinlen died in December 1903, his children succeeded him in running the Heinlen Company, going door to door to collect rent. Heinlenville sustained damage in the 1906 San Francisco earthquake but was not destroyed like the San Francisco Chinatown. Merchants quickly rebuilt and expanded their shops, benefiting from a booming local agricultural industry.

Heinlenville declined in the 1920s as younger generations sought careers in business or manufacturing, rather than shopkeeping or gambling, or sought better housing outside the aging enclave. In 1931, during the Great Depression, the Heinlen Company declared bankruptcy and sold its Heinlenville land to the city. Most remaining residents moved to Japantown. The city razed the entire neighborhood, except for the Ng Shing Gung building, to make way for a municipal corporation yard. After an 18-year legal battle, the Ng Shing Gung was dismantled in May 1949. In 1991, it was reconstructed in History Park in San Jose and is now the Chinese American Historical Museum, which contains artifacts from Heinlenville.

== See also ==
- History of the Chinese Americans in San Francisco
- Anti-Chinese violence in California
- Japantown, San Jose
- Little Saigon, San Jose
- Lion Plaza
- Chinese American Historical Museum (CAHM)
