= Signia Hilton San Jose =

Hotel in San Jose, California, US

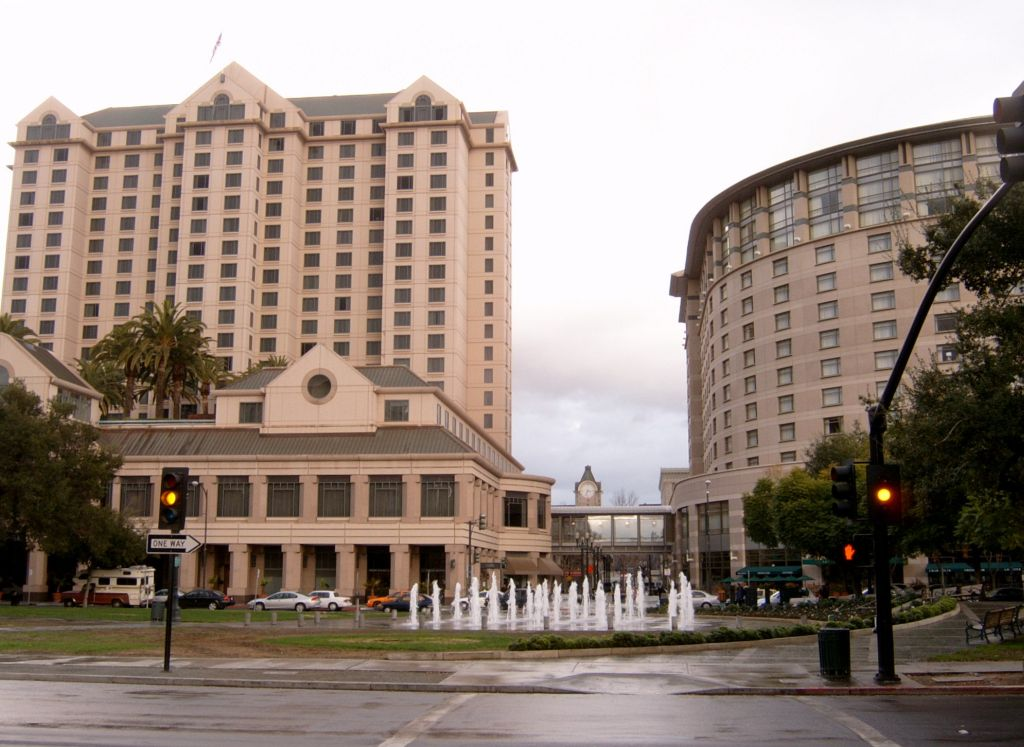
- The hotel from Plaza de César Chávez (left); on the right, former annex
- Hotel chain: Hilton Hotels and Resorts

General information
- Location: United States, 170 South Market Street; San Jose, California 95113
- Coordinates: 37.33305°N 121.88898°W
- Opening: 1987; reopened 2022
- Cost: US$140 million
- Owner: Sam Hirbod and associates

Height
- Height: 252 feet (77 m)

Technical details
- Floor count: 22
- Floor area: Meetings: 28,000 sq ft (2,600 m^{2})

Design and construction
- Architects: Hellmuth, Obata and Kassabaum, Nishkian Menninger

Other information
- Number of rooms: 500
- Number of suites: 42
- Parking: garage

Website
- www.hilton.com/en/hotels/sjcsmsa-signia-san-jose/

The Signia Hilton San Jose is a postmodern high-rise hotel at 170 South Market Street in San Jose, California, located on the Plaza de César Chávez in Downtown San Jose. Constructed in 1987 as the Fairmont San Jose, it reopened as a Hilton hotel in 2022. The former south tower of the hotel is now a student residence for San Jose State University, Spartan Village on the Paseo.

== Description ==
The hotel is a 22-story tower designed in postmodern style by Hellmuth, Obata & Kassabaum with Nishkian Menninger as structural engineers, with 500 rooms and 42 suites. It includes 65,000 square feet of meeting space, including a large ballroom. There is a fitness center and a rooftop swimming pool and deck with a specially designed windscreen to create a microclimate designed to be acceptable for sunbathing and swimming.

== History ==
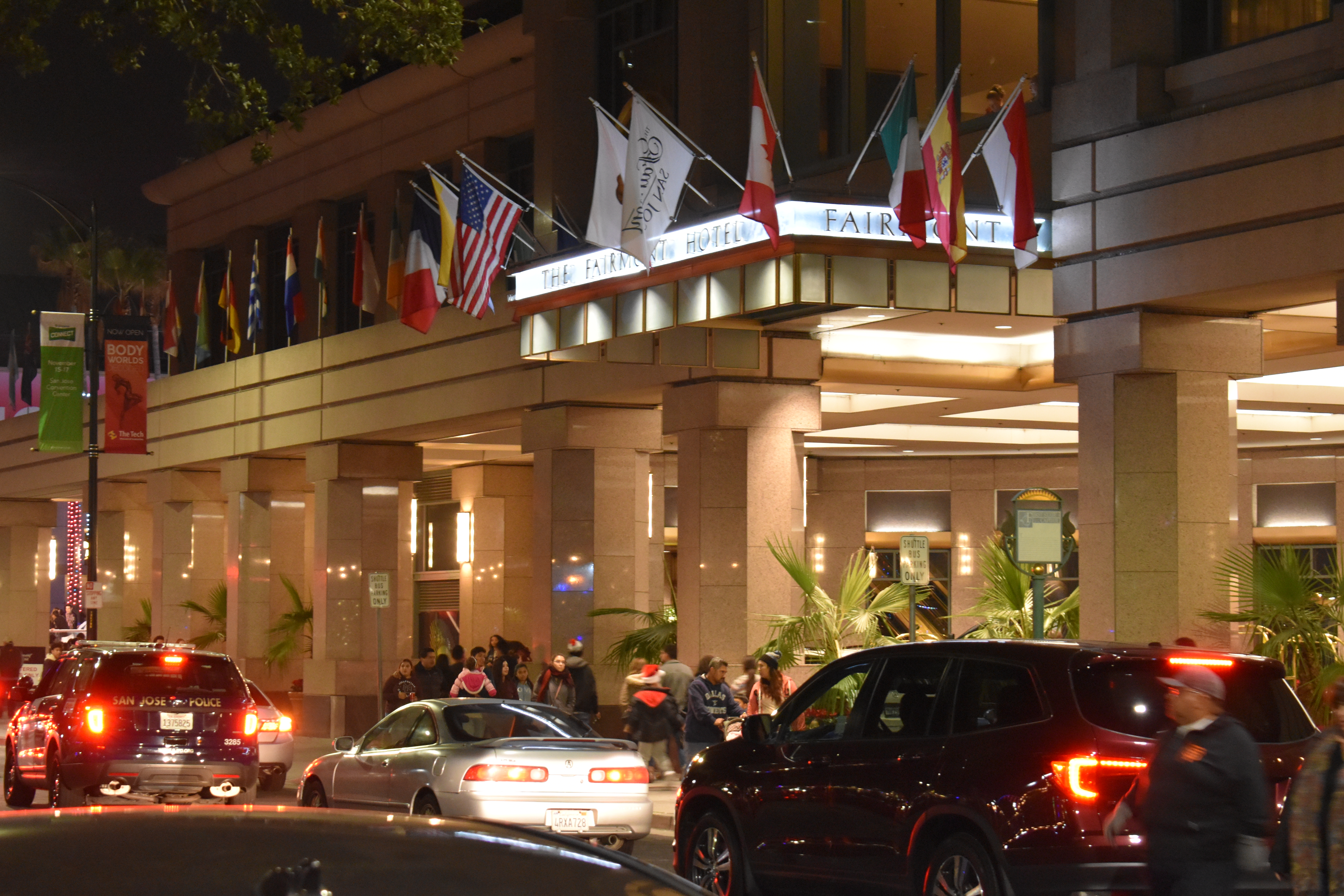
Main entrance, 2017

The hotel stands on the site of San Jose's first Chinese enclave, the Market Street Chinatown, which existed from 1866 until its destruction by arson in 1887. A plaque on the hotel's exterior commemorates the racist attack. The hotel was planned in the 1980s as part of an urban renewal project funded by the Redevelopment Agency of San Jose, which also included the Silicon Valley Financial Center and Circle of Palms Plaza; it was developed by The Swig Company. Construction led to a hasty salvage excavation of artifacts from the former Chinatown.

The hotel opened on October 5, 1987 as the Fairmont San Jose, part of the Fairmont Hotels and Resorts chain. It was purchased in 1996 by Light Tower Associates, led by developer Lewis Wolff. In 2002, a 13-story, 264-room annex opened. Designed by Gensler and Associates and Moore Ruble Yudell Architects, This second tower was built on the site of the historic Hotel Montgomery, which was moved 186 feet (57 m) to the south and restored; it is now the Four Points by Sheraton San Jose Downtown hotel. In January 2018, the Fairmont San Jose was sold to SJ SC Holdings, an investment group led by Eagle Canyon Capital.

On March 5, 2021, FMT SJ LLC, the then owner, filed for Chapter 11 reorganization, closing the hotel while it sought a new management partner and extended the existing mortgage debt. The owner stated that as a result of the COVID-19 pandemic, occupancy had been less than 7%, and the hotel had lost at least $18 million in 2020 and was projected to lose at least another $20 million in 2021.

The hotel reopened in April 2022 as Signia by Hilton San Jose, a Hilton property with 805 rooms. The owners subsequently downsized, vacating the south tower annex and selling it in 2023 to Throckmorton Partners, a developer. That tower was converted the following year into a residence for San Jose State University students, Spartan Village on the Paseo, which opened in August 2024. The university is leasing the building for 25 months and will then purchase it.

On October 31, 2024, workers at the Signia ratified new labor contracts. This occurred in the aftermath of a three day strike which took place at the Signia over the 2024 Labor Day weekend in September. The hotel filed for Chapter 11 bankruptcy for a second time in November 2024. In 2026, the hotel was slightly renamed, becoming Signia Hilton San Jose, dropping the word "by".
