= Walter Construction Group =

One of Australia's oldest and largest construction companies

Walter Construction Group Limited
- Formerly: Concrete Constructions
- Type: Privately held company
- Industry: Construction
- Founded: 21 April 1920
- Founder: Allen Lewis
- Defunct: 2005
- Fate: Bankruptcy
- Headquarters: Sydney, Australia
- Area served: Australia
- Revenue: $500 million (2005)
- Number of employees: 1,000 (2005)
- Parent: Walter Bau
- Website: www.walter.net.au

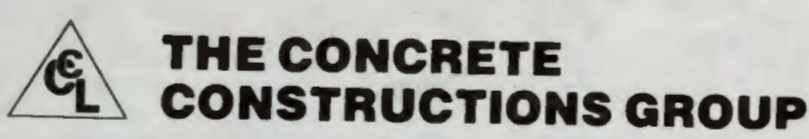
The company's logo prior to its rebranding as Walter Construction Group

Walter Construction Group Limited, known for most of its life as Concrete Constructions Pty Ltd, was one of Australia's oldest and fifth largest construction company prior to its 2005 collapse. The company was founded on 21 April 1920 by Allen Lewis. It remained independent until 1999, when the company was bought by the German Walter Bau and rebranded as Walter Construction Group.

== Collapse ==
Before its collapse, Walter Construction had two divisions: "Construction and Civil", and "Mining". While the mining division was profitable and expanding, the construction division had been losing money since 2000. By the company's collapse, 18 of its 21 contracts were cash flow negative. During this period the company heavily relied on its parent company for financial support, however Walter Bau was also experiencing financial difficulties and both companies were placed into liquidation on 3 February 2005. KordaMentha was appointed the administrator, and proceeded to liquidate the remaining assets of the company by 2018. During their investigation, it was also revealed that Walter Construction had traded while insolvent.

Prior to the collapse, John Holland Group had a bid to acquire Walter Construction, however the deal fell through in 2002.

== Notable projects ==
- John Gorton Building
- Black Mountain Tower
- Parliament House, Canberra
- Grosvenor Place (Sydney)

== See also ==
- LR&M Constructions
- Hardcastle & Richards
