= Probuild =

Defunct Australian construction company

- Industry: Construction
- Founded: 1987
- Founder: Phil Mehtren
- Defunct: February 2022
- Headquarters: St Kilda Road, Melbourne, Australia
- Area served: Australia
- Revenue: $1.4 billion (2021)
- Number of employees: 750 (2022)
- Parent: Wilson Bayly Holmes Ovcon
- Website: www.probuild.com.au

Probuild was an Australian construction company that traded from 1987 until 2022.

== History ==
Probuild was founded in 1987 by Phil Mehtren. In 2000 it was purchased by Wilson Bayly Holmes Ovcon. An attempt to sell the business to the China Communications Construction Company in 2021 was blocked by the Government of Australia on national security grounds. In February 2022, it was placed in voluntary administration by Wilson Bayly Holmes Ovcon with Deloitte appointed administrator.

Roberts & Co took over five projects in Melbourne, while the Western Australian business was sold to SRG Global. Hutchinson Builders took over the 443 Queen Street, Brisbane project.

== Notable projects ==
Notable projects completed by Probuild included:

- Aurora Melbourne Central
- Greenland Centre, Sydney
- Marina Tower Melbourne
- Netball Central, Sydney
- Victoria One

At the time of its cessation, Probuild was involved in the construction of The Ribbon, Sydney, West Side Place and 443 Queen Street, Brisbane.
