= Sheraton Tripoli Hotel =

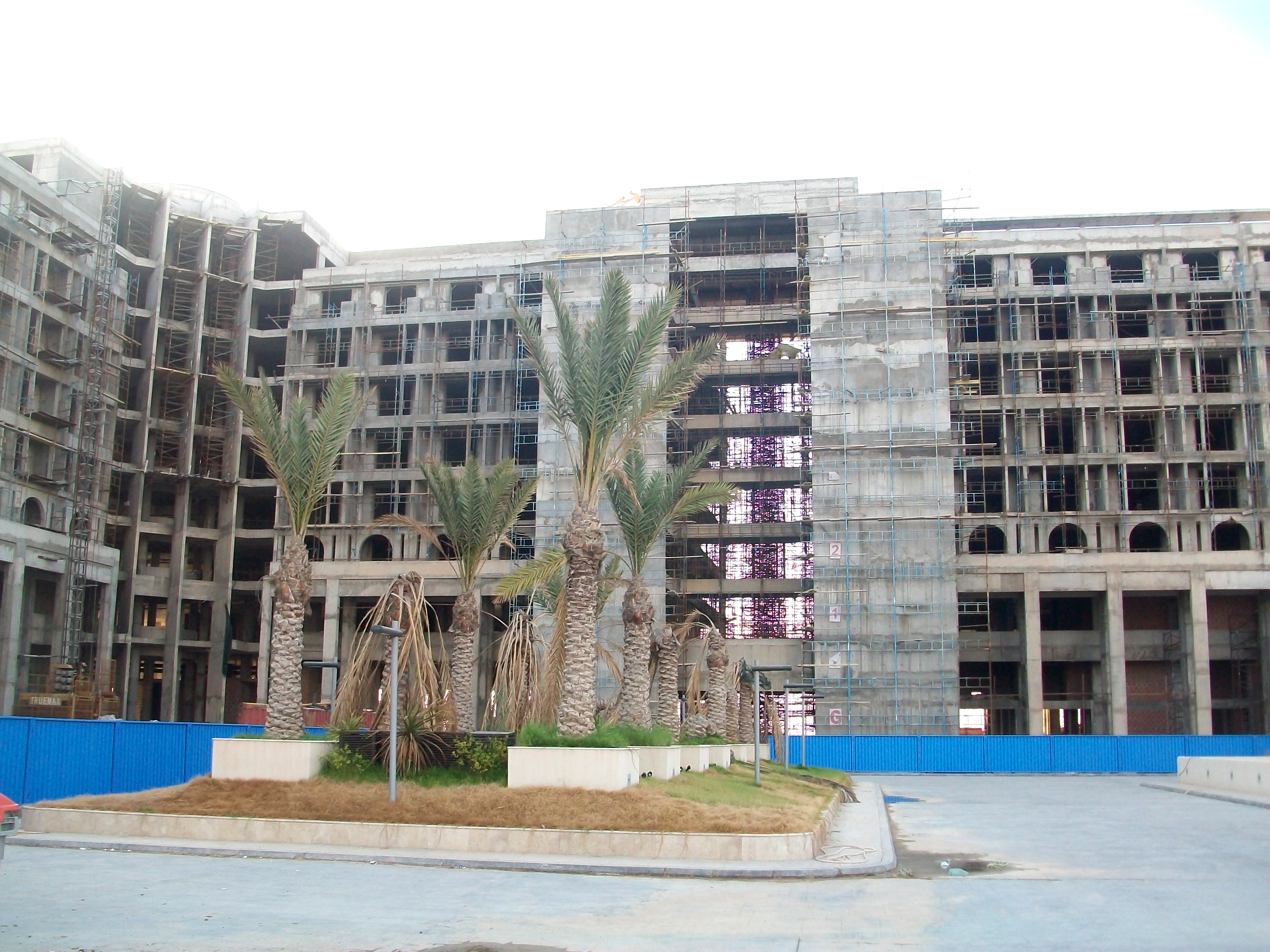
- Facade of the hotel, July 2012.
- Interactive map of the Sheraton Tripoli Hotel area

General information
- Location: Tripoli, Libya
- Coordinates: 32°52′52.26″N 13°8′43.21″E

The Sheraton Tripoli Hotel is a partially-completed five-star hotel in Libya's capital Tripoli in the Gergarish District. It was planned to form the Al-Andalus Tourist Complex. Set to become a part of Starwood's Sheraton chain, work on the hotel was underway when the Libyan Civil War broke out in February 2011. Construction was halted and the structure has been abandoned. The hotel was meant to complement the adjacent Four Points by Sheraton Tripoli, which opened in January 2011, only to shut operations a few months later because of the civil war. As of 2021, the Four Points hotel is open but not associated with Marriott International despite still carrying its former name.
