= LRM =

LRM may refer to:

- Land Reform Museum, a museum in Taipei, Taiwan
- La Romana International Airport (IATA code), in the Dominican Republic
- Learning relationship management, a family of learning management software
- Left-to-right mark, a Unicode bidirectional formatting character
- Leitrim Rifle Militia, an Irish Militia regiment raised in County Leitrim
- LR&M Constructions, an Australian civil engineering and construction company
- IFLA Library Reference Model, a conceptual entity–relationship model
- Large Reasoning Model, a type of artificial intelligence model, usually a neural network
- Lance-roquettes multiple, a variant of the M270 Multiple Launch Rocket System formerly in service with the French Army
