= Marina Towers =

Marina Towers may refer to:

- Marina Towers (Beirut), a residential building complex in Beirut
- Marina City, a mixed-use residential/commercial building complex in Chicago
- The Tower, Meridian Quay, Swansea referred to as Marina Tower during pre-planning
- Marina Towers Observatory, in Swansea
- Marina Tower Melbourne, a mixed-use development in Melbourne, Australia
