= Chinese American Historical Museum =

Chinese American Historical Museum in San Jose, California

The Chinese American Historical Museum (CAHM) (simplified Chinese: 圣何塞华人历史博物馆; traditional Chinese: 聖何塞華人歷史博物館), also known as the Ng Shing Gung Museum, is located in History Park in San Jose, California, US. Inspired by the Ng Shing Gung ("Temple of the Five Gods") from 1888, in San Jose's Heinlenville Chinatown (6th Street), CAHM is a cultural museum with the mission to promote, educate, and preserve Chinese and Chinese American history and culture in the Santa Clara Valley and in California.

== History ==
Originally built in 1888, the museum is located in the Ng Shing Gung building ("Temple of the Five Gods") in San Jose's Heinlenville Chinatown (6th Street). The museum initially began as a project from the Chinese Historical & Cultural Project (CHCP), a nonprofit organization based in Santa Clara County California, which promotes, educates, and preserves Chinese and Chinese American history and culture.

In 1987, CHCP built a replica of the Ng Shing Gung to house the museum's local history collections. Under CHCP, CAHM organizes workshops highlighting their museum displays and collections such as artifacts from the first and third Chinatowns from the San Jose Fairmont Hotel Excavation and Woolen Mills Chinatown. CAHM's collections such as the altar vessels from 1892 are occasionally on loan to museums such as the Tenement Museum and the Museum of Chinese in America. Architectural drawings of the original temple are often on display as well.

In 2016, CAHM hosted an exhibit titled “Homebase: A Chinatown Called Heinlenville,” produced in 1991 by Jessica Yu and featuring "interviews of former residents, family, and archival photographs and rare film footage."

In 2025, the museum's “Local Heroes: Chinese Americans in WWII” exhibit featured local Bay Area veterans' personal memorabilia and oral histories.

== See also ==
- Chinese American Museum
- Chinese Culture Center
- Chinese Historical Society of Southern California
- History of Chinese Americans in San Francisco
- Museum of Chinese in America
- History Park
- Chinatowns in San Jose, California
- Market Street Chinatown
