= San Jose BioCenter =

- Formation: 2004; 22 years ago
- Type: Business incubator
- Location: San Jose, California
- Parent organization: San Jose Redevelopment Agency
- Website: sjbiocenter.com

The San Jose BioCenter is a business incubator formed as a university foundation in 2004 and focused on the initiation and development of technology companies, with an emphasis on the life sciences industry. The BioCenter emerged from San Jose State University in an effort to revitalize an industrial area of San Jose, California. As of 2012, the BioCenter had thirty-five member (assisted) companies and twelve affiliate (supporting) companies. In addition to office space, the BioCenter provides wet laboratory facilities to member companies.
