= 443 Queen Street, Brisbane =

Residential skyscraper in Brisbane, Queensland

443 Queen Street
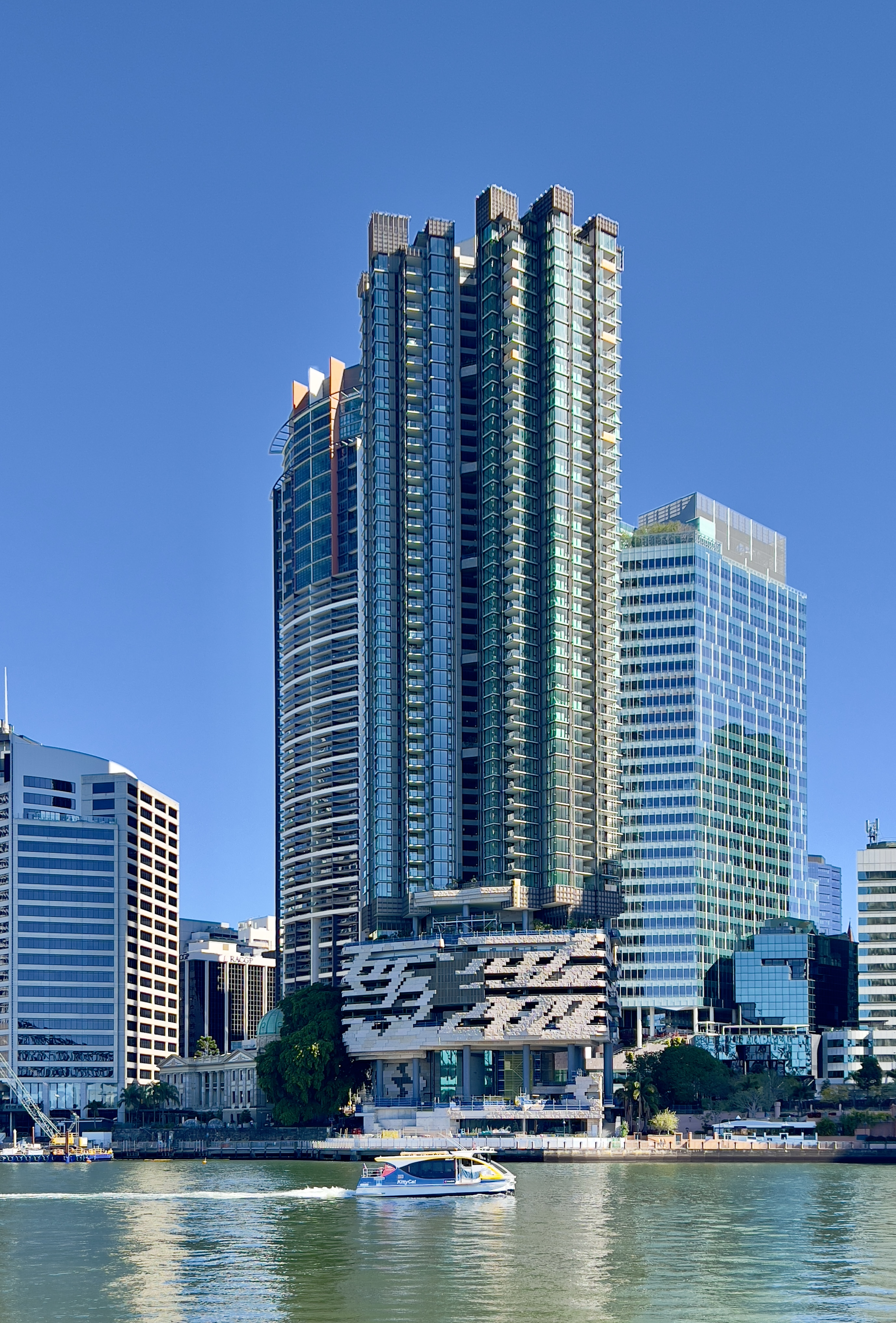
- 443 Queen Street in May 2023
- Interactive map of the 443 Queen Street area

General information
- Status: Completed
- Type: Residential
- Architectural style: Subtropical residential architecture
- Location: Brisbane, Australia, 443 Queen Street
- Coordinates: 27.464970°S 153.031491°E
- Groundbreaking: May 2018
- Completed: 2023

Height
- Height: 183.7 metres (603 ft)

Technical details
- Floor count: 47

Design and construction
- Architects: Richard Hassell and Elizabeth Watson-Brown
- Architecture firm: WOHA
- Developer: Cbus Property
- Structural engineer: Arup
- Services engineer: Aecom & Acor Consultants (Hydraulic Design)
- Civil engineer: Arup
- Quantity surveyor: Rider Levett Bucknall
- Main contractor: Probuild; Hutchinson Builders

Other information
- Number of rooms: 264
- Parking: 277

Website
- 443queenst.com

443 Queen Street is a residential skyscraper constructed at 443 Queen Street, Brisbane, Australia. The site is the last riverfront location in the Brisbane central business district and it is also the first truly subtropical skyscraper in Australia. The 47 storey tower includes 106 one bedroom, 106 two bedroom and 54 four bedroom apartments. All 264 apartments will have views of the Brisbane River. Due to its unique design the tower is described as a high rise Queenslander.

A development application for the project was lodged with the Brisbane City Council in October 2015. The University of Queensland, that owned the adjoining Customs House, unsuccessfully appealed the approval.

Demolition of the former office building commenced in October 2017, with construction of the footings for the new building commencing in May 2018.

Construction was suspended in February 2022 after contractor Probuild was placed in administration. The building was completed by Hutchinson Builders.

== See also ==
- List of tallest buildings in Brisbane
