= Market Street Chinatown =

Market Street Chinatown 孖結街唐人埠
- Neighborhood of San Jose
- Etymology: Market Plaza
- Interactive map of Market Street Chinatown
- Coordinates: 37°20′0″N 121°53′23″W
- Country: United States
- State: California
- County: Santa Clara
- City: San Jose
- Built: 1866
- Demolished: May 4, 1887
- Founder: Ah Toy, Ah Charlie, Ah Lee

Population (1876)
  - Total: 1,400

Market Street Chinatown (Chinese: 孖結街唐人埠) or Plaza Chinatown refers to two successive Chinatowns in San Jose, California, during the 19th century. Both were destroyed by arson with the tacit support of officials. The site was rediscovered during a 1980s redevelopment project, shedding light on an era when San Jose led the state of California in anti-Chinese violence.

== First settlement ==
San Jose's first Chinatown was located at the southwest corner of Market and San Fernando streets, near the present-day Circle of Palms Plaza. City officials noted the Chinese presence by 1866. Most Chinese immigrants were seasonal workers in Santa Clara Valley's orchards. In February 1869, after the First Methodist Episcopal Church welcomed 166 Chinese people to its Missionary Sunday School, arsonists burned the church to the ground and sent the pastor a death threat. By January 1870, white residents had begun complaining to the San Jose City Council about the concentration of Chinese people in the neighborhood. A couple weeks later, Chinatown burned to the ground while the San Jose Fire Department did little to save it.

== Second settlement ==
In March 1870, a wealthy Chinese businessman from San Francisco secured a ten-year lease of the original Market Street Chinatown's land and merchants began to rebuild. A competing Chinatown also sprang up on Vine Street, near the Guadalupe River, but its residents returned to Market Street after severe flooding in 1871–1872.

The second Market Street Chinatown grew to about 1,400 people by 1876. The 1880 census recorded only 614 residents, but researchers believe that this was a severe undercount typical of minority populations at the time. By 1884, it occupied most of the block along Market Plaza between San Fernando and San Antonio streets. Residents were served by three restaurants, a theater, and a Chinese temple, or joss house. Buildings to the north were largely made of fireproof brick, while buildings to the south were made of wood. Chinatown organized its own volunteer fire brigade, due to an ordinance excluding the neighborhood from the city's fire district.

== Tensions rise again ==
Initially, white residents tolerated the Chinatown to some extent because it was located in the older, less desirable Spanish part of town. However, as the main business district expanded southward along First Street, boosters increasingly viewed Chinatown's proximity to it and Market Plaza as an obstacle to growth. Merchants complained of Chinatown's "blight", while parishioners at St. Joseph's Cathedral across the street objected to its "sins and smells". In 1878, Denis Kearney visited San Jose, inciting crowds against the Chinese. His Workingmen's Party championed a provision in the 1879 state constitution that briefly allowed the legislature to make the employment of Chinese people a misdemeanor offense.

As anti-Chinese sentiment peaked in the 1880s, white residents tried to rein in the Chinese community. Children faced harassment when leaving the neighborhood. For its part, the city passed ordinances banning important cultural practices such as firecrackers, carrying poles, and even kites. The Market Street Chinatown was burned several times, but the Chinese residents quickly repaired the damage each time. In January 1886, the city voted to close all Chinese-owned laundries and began arresting laundrymen for operating in wooden buildings, prompting the washhouses to stop work in protest. The next month, San Jose hosted California's first statewide anti-Chinese convention.

== Destruction ==
On March 24, 1887, in response to Yick Wo v. Hopkins, the city council declared Chinatown a public nuisance and discussed options for legally removing the community from the city's center. On May 4, while most residents were occupied waiting for the results of a lottery, a fire broke out on Ah Toy Alley. As the town's white residents looked on, the intense fire engulfed the neighborhood, burning down every structure except the theater. Chinatown's own emergency water tanks were nearly empty, and the city's fire department acted only to prevent the fire's spread beyond Chinatown. Local newspapers cheered the neighborhood's destruction. The next day, the city council approved funding for a new San Jose City Hall on the plaza directly across from the former Chinatown, stipulating that no Chinese labor be used in its construction. Similar suspicious fires soon consumed Chinatowns in Fresno and Chico. The Market Street Chinatown's inhabitants temporarily resided at San Fernando and Vine streets before moving on to the Woolen Mills Chinatown and Heinlenville, both north of the city.

== Legacy ==
In 1981, the Redevelopment Agency of San Jose contracted Theodoratus Cultural Research to conduct archaeological testing as part of the urban renewal project that included the Circle of Palms Plaza, Fairmont Hotel, and Silicon Valley Financial Center. Numerous artifacts were uncovered, but construction proceeded as planned. In response to outcry from the Chinese community at the site's destruction, the Redevelopment Agency contracted Archaeological Resource Services to perform salvage excavation alongside construction crews from 1985 to 1988. Artifacts were stored in a warehouse inaccessible to researchers. A Caltrans-funded excavation of the Woolen Mills Chinatown site revived interest in the earlier Market Street site. In 2002, the Stanford University Archaeology Center, the Stanford Department of Anthropology, History San Jose, and the Chinese Historical and Cultural Project partnered to catalog, analyze, and curate the artifacts.

On September 28, 2021, the city formally apologized for its past discrimination against the Chinese community, including its role in the 1887 fire. A plaque outside the Fairmont (now the Signia) commemorates the fire.

== See also ==
- Stop Asian Hate
- Chinatowns in San Jose, California
