= John Gorton Building =

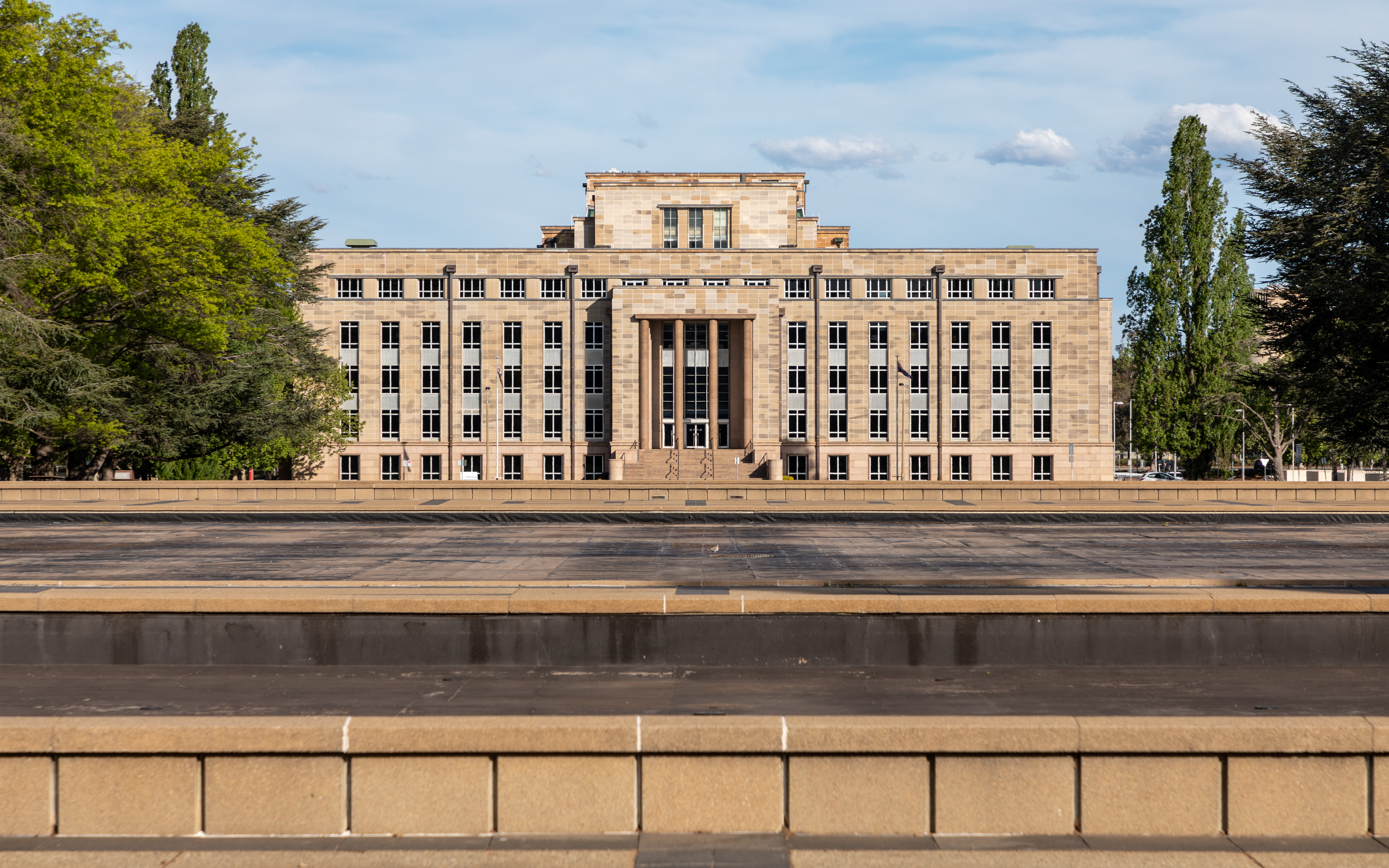
- Interactive map of the John Gorton Building area
- Former names: Administrative Building
- Etymology: John Gorton

General information
- Status: Under renovation
- Type: Commercial office
- Architectural style: Inter-war Stripped Classical
- Location: King Edward Terrace, Parkes, Canberra, Australian Capital Territory, Australia
- Coordinates: 35°18′04″S 149°08′02″E
- Groundbreaking: 7 October 1927
- Construction started: 1946
- Topped-out: 1956
- Completed: 1956
- Opened: 2 February 1956; 70 years ago
- Renovated: 2013
- Cost: £5 million
- Renovation cost: A$17.3 million
- Owner: Commonwealth of Australia

Design and construction
- Architect: George Sydney Jones
- Architecture firm: Robertson & Marks; Department of the Interior; Department of Works and Housing
- Main contractor: Concrete Constructions

Commonwealth Heritage List
- Official name: John Gorton Building, Parkes Pl, Parkes, ACT, Australia
- Type: Listed place
- Criteria: D., E.
- Designated: 22 June 2004
- Reference no.: 105472

Commonwealth Heritage List
- Official name: Communications Centre, King Edward Tce, Parkes, ACT, Australia
- Type: Listed place
- Criteria: A., B., F., H.
- Designated: 15 July 2004
- Reference no.: 105618

The John Gorton Building, also referred to as the Gorton Building and formerly the Administrative Building, is a heritage listed government office located within the Parliamentary Triangle in Canberra, Australia. The office building is the administrative headquarters of the Department of Climate Change, Energy, the Environment and Water.

Planned in 1924, designed in 1946 and completed in 1956, the Administrative Building is significant as a good Canberra example of the Inter-war Stripped Classical style. Key features of this style displayed by the building include: the symmetrical facades; the division of the elevations into vertical bays; the occasional use of correct classical details; the use of a basic classical column form; the expressed portico; the simple surface treatments; and subdued spandrels between the storeys which emphasise verticality. Design elements which retain a high level of integrity include the exterior, foyers, lift lobbies and central corridors.

The Administrative Building is also part of the significant cultural landscape of the Parliamentary Triangle. It occupies a prominent and strategic location flanking the land axis in accordance with the 1916 Griffin plan. Together with the later Treasury Building balancing its mass across the central lawns of the land axis, the Administrative Building contributes to the planned aesthetic qualities of the Parliamentary Triangle. The building was listed on the Commonwealth Heritage List on 22 June 2004.

== History ==
The building was first planned 1924, with construction breaking ground soon after in 1927. However, due to budgetary constraints and substandard foundation construction, the project was delayed indefinitely. It took until 1946 for construction to begin, designed in the Inter-war Stripped Classical style. It took a further ten years for the building to finally open in 1956. The entire construction project took place in the context of a large post-war expansion effort within Canberra.

When the office building was first opened, it was occupied by the News and Information Bureau, the Department of the Interior, the Department of Health, and the Department of External Affairs (DEA). The DEA and succeeding departments remained the building's primary occupant up until the late 1990s when the Department of Finance moved in. In 1999 the building was renamed to the John Gorton Building, after Australia's 19th prime minister, John Gorton.

=== Communications Centre ===
In 1974, construction began on an underground communications centre for the Department of Foreign Affairs (previously the Department of External Affairs), who were now the primary occupant of the building following an expansion during the cold war. The existing structure did not have the security nor space to house the communications equipment. In order to prevent spying and protect against foreign attacks, it was constructed with steel lined walls and a concrete super structure.

By 2000, due to the modernization of the computer systems and their subsequent move to the main structure, the communications centre ceased occupation for several years. Among other refurbishment and modifications, in 2002 its concrete roof slab was cut open to add skylights and sunken gardens. In 2003, it was occupied newly occupying Department of Finance.

The site was added to the Commonwealth Heritage List in 2004.

== See also ==
- Australian non-residential architectural styles
