= Four Points by Sheraton Brisbane =

Skyscrapers in Brisbane

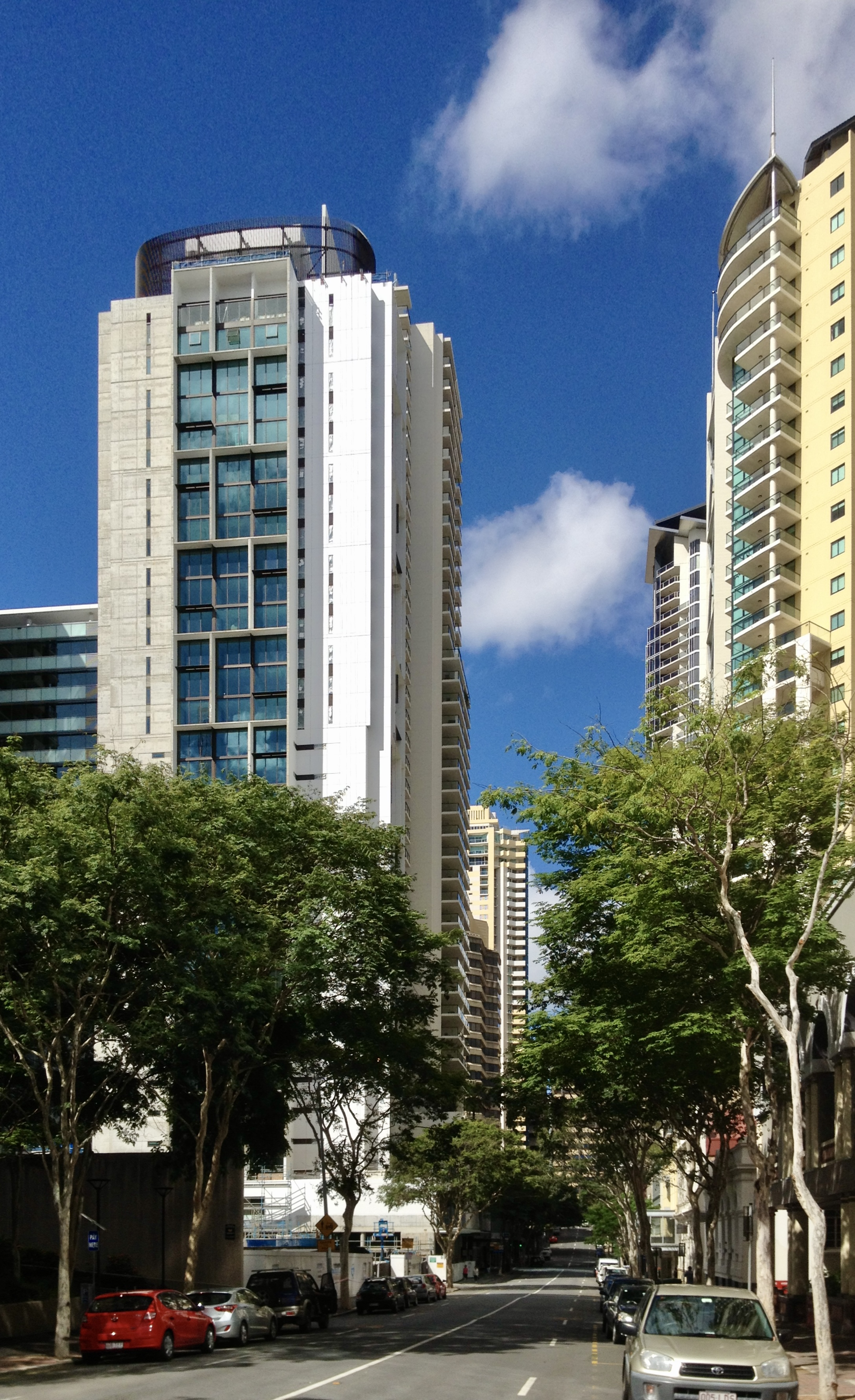
- Hotel under construction in December 2013
- Hotel chain: Four Points by Sheraton

General information
- Location: Brisbane, Australia, 99 Mary Street
- Opening: March 2014
- Operator: Felicity Hotels

Height
- Height: 107-metre (351 ft)

Technical details
- Floor count: 33

Design and construction
- Architect: Noel Robinson Architects
- Developer: Hutchinson Builders

Other information
- Number of rooms: 246
- Number of restaurants: 1
- Parking: 53

Website
- Four Points by Sheraton Brisbane

The Four Points by Sheraton Brisbane is a hotel tower located at 99 Mary Street in Brisbane, Australia.

== Location ==
The 33-storey, 107-metre (351 ft) skyscraper is located in the heart of the Brisbane central business district adjacent to the Botanic Gardens and the Parliament House.

== Facilities ==
The hotel tower includes 246 rooms of average size of 27 square metres. The hotel facilities include a restaurant, a cafe bar and 200 square metres of function space.

== Management and construction ==
The hotel is managed by the Felicity Hotels group under the international hotel brand Four Points by Sheraton.

The hotel was completed in early March 2014.

== See also ==
- List of tallest buildings in Brisbane
