= Marina Tower Melbourne =

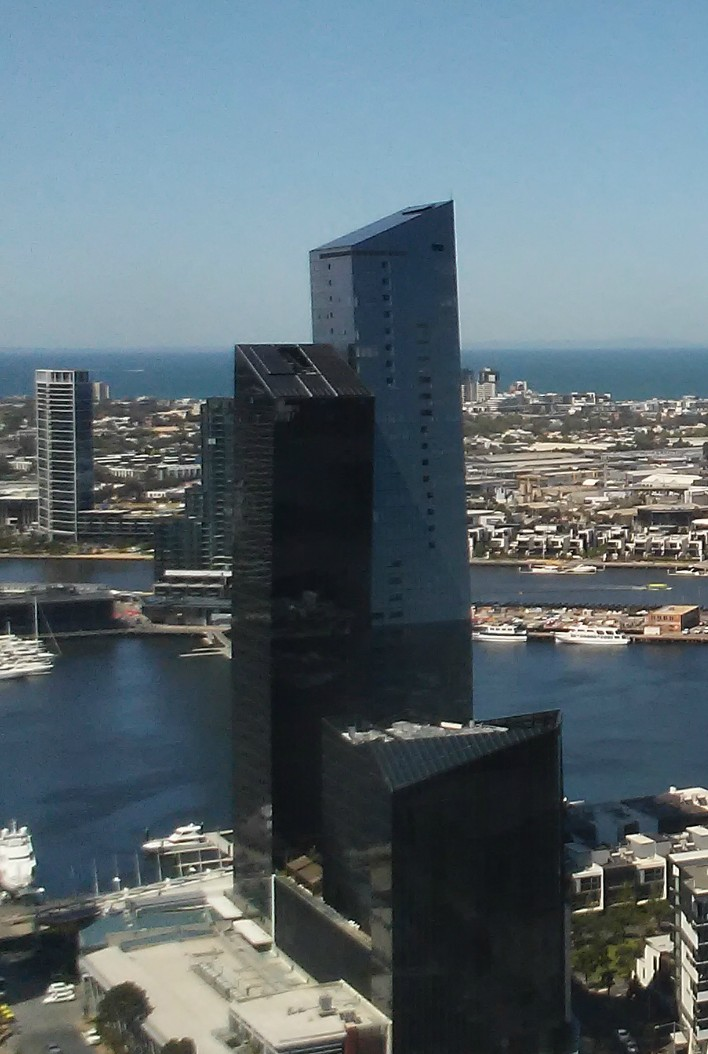
- Interactive map of the Marina Tower Melbourne area

General information
- Status: Completed
- Type: Residential apartments
- Location: 8 Pearl River Road, Docklands, Victoria, Australia
- Coordinates: 37.8155292°S 144.9357198°E
- Construction started: 2015
- Completed: 2017

Height
- Height: 140 metres (460 ft)

Technical details
- Material: Concrete
- Floor count: 43 and 36
- Floor area: 3,650 square metres (39,300 sq ft)

Design and construction
- Architecture firm: DKO
- Developer: Hiap Hoe
- Engineer: Webber Design
- Main contractor: Probuild
- Known for: Inclined tower

Other information
- Number of rooms: 461 apartments 273 hotel rooms
- Parking: Six storey car park 290 spaces

Website
- www.hiaphoe.com/marina-tower-melbourne

Marina Tower Melbourne is a residential development in Melbourne Docklands, Australia, featuring a 43-storey inclined tower and a 36-storey inclined tower that are conjoined to the 21st floor and then diverge at five degree angles. The development also includes a seven-storey Four Points by Sheraton hotel.

== See also ==
- List of tallest buildings in Melbourne
- Inclined building
