= Hotel Montgomery (San Jose, California) =

Historic hotel in San Jose, California, US

Four Points by Sheraton San Jose Downtown (Hotel Montgomery)
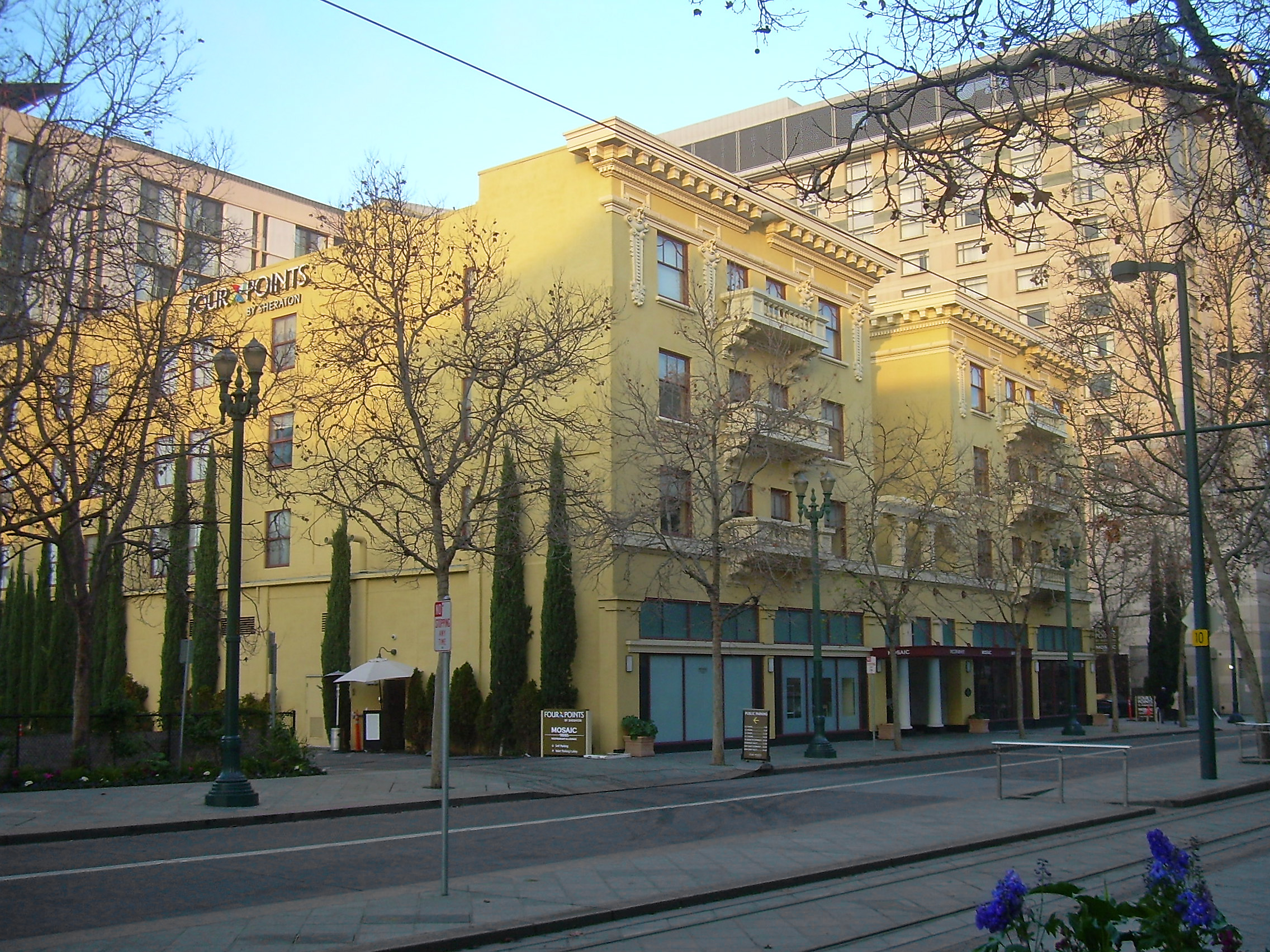
- Interactive map of the Four Points by Sheraton San Jose Downtown (Hotel Montgomery) area
- Hotel chain: Four Points by Sheraton

General information
- Location: United States, 211 S. First Street; San Jose, California
- Opening: 1911, 2002
- Operator: Marriott International

Technical details
- Floor area: 60,000 sq ft (5,600 m^{2})

Design and construction
- Architect: William Binder
- Developer: Thomas S. Montgomery

Other information
- Number of rooms: 86
- Number of restaurants: 1

Website
- www.marriott.com/hotels/travel/sjcfp-four-points-san-jose-downtown/
- Hotel Montgomery
- U.S. National Register of Historic Places
- Location within San Jose, California Location within California Location within the United States
- Location: 211 SW First St., San Jose, California
- Coordinates: 37°19′57″N 121°53′15″W
- Area: less than one acre
- Built: 1911
- Architect: Binder, William
- Architectural style: Early Commercial
- NRHP reference No.: 06000328
- Added to NRHP: April 20, 2006

The Four Points by Sheraton San Jose Downtown or Hotel Montgomery is a historic hotel in Downtown San Jose, California.

== History ==
The Montgomery Hotel was built in 1911 by real estate developer Thomas S. Montgomery, a director of the Southern Pacific Railroad and its competitor, the Western Pacific Railroad, and chairman of the California Prune and Apricot Growers Association. The hotel was designed by William Binder in the Classical Revival style.

In an effort to preserve the hotel, the San Jose Redevelopment Agency arranged for the Montgomery to be moved at a cost of $8.6 million to accommodate the 13-story, 264 room expansion of the Fairmont San Jose Hotel. On January 29, 2000, the building was moved 57 m (187 ft) south of its original location at First Street and Paseo de San Antonio. The total cost of the renovation, including the move, was $25.5 million. At an estimated weight of 4,750 short tons (4,310 t), the Montgomery Hotel is considered to be the fourth-heaviest building ever moved and the heaviest to be moved intact on hydraulic jacks and rubber wheels, as opposed to steel rail and steel wheels.

The hotel was reopened in 2004 as the Hotel Montgomery, but later rebranded to Four Points by Sheraton, now doing business as Four Points by Sheraton San Jose Downtown. The hotel is owned and operated by Khanna Enterprises, III, LLC, of Santa Ana, California.

The building is listed on the California Register of Historical Places.

In 2016, the hotel announced plans to expand by means of construction of a 24-story addition, directly north of the original building. This was later cancelled.
