= Hutchinson Builders =

Australian construction company

- Type: Private
- Industry: Construction
- Founded: 1912
- Headquarters: Brisbane, Australia
- Area served: Australia
- Key people: Scott Hutchinson (Chairman); Russell Fryer (Managing Director)
- Revenue: $3.3 billion (2023/24)
- Net income: $4.1 million (2023/24)
- Owner: Hutchinson family
- Number of employees: 1,900 (2024)
- Divisions: Hutchies Civil, Hutchies Fitouts, Hutchies Joinery, Hutchies Modular, Hutchies Training, Hutchies Cranes & Hoists, Hutchies Scaffold & Plant
- Website: www.hutchies.com.au

Hutchinson Builders is a privately-owned construction company headquartered in Brisbane, Australia.

== History ==
Hutchinson Builders was established as J. Hutchinson in Brisbane, Queensland on 29 January 1912, with its first project being the construction of a new kitchen at Fort Lytton for the Government of Queensland.

== Recognition ==
In 2023, Hutchinson was recognised as Australia’s largest builder in the BCI Construction League Report.

According to research firm IBISWorld, as of 2019, Hutchinson was Australia’s sixth-largest private company by revenue, and the largest privately owned builder in Australia.

In 2024, chairman of the company Scott Hutchinson was named as a Queensland Great in recognition of his philanthropy and cultural advocacy.

== Notable projects ==
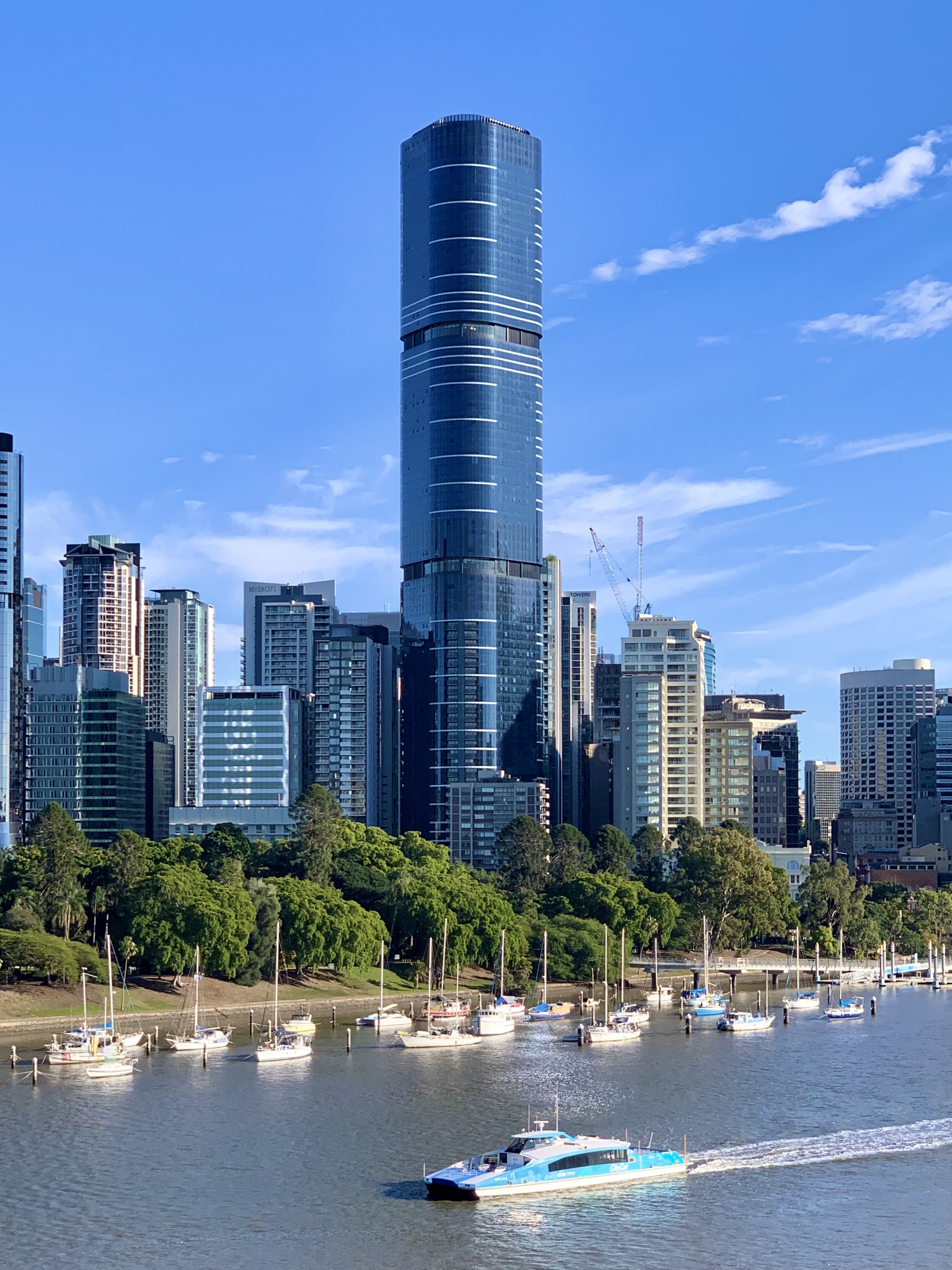
Brisbane Skytower

- Brisbane Skytower
- Four Points by Sheraton Brisbane
- Hobart Airport terminal expansion
- Rockhampton Town Hall
- Santos Place
- Springfield Central Stadium
- 443 Queen Street, Brisbane

== See also ==
- LR&M Constructions
