= Santos Place =

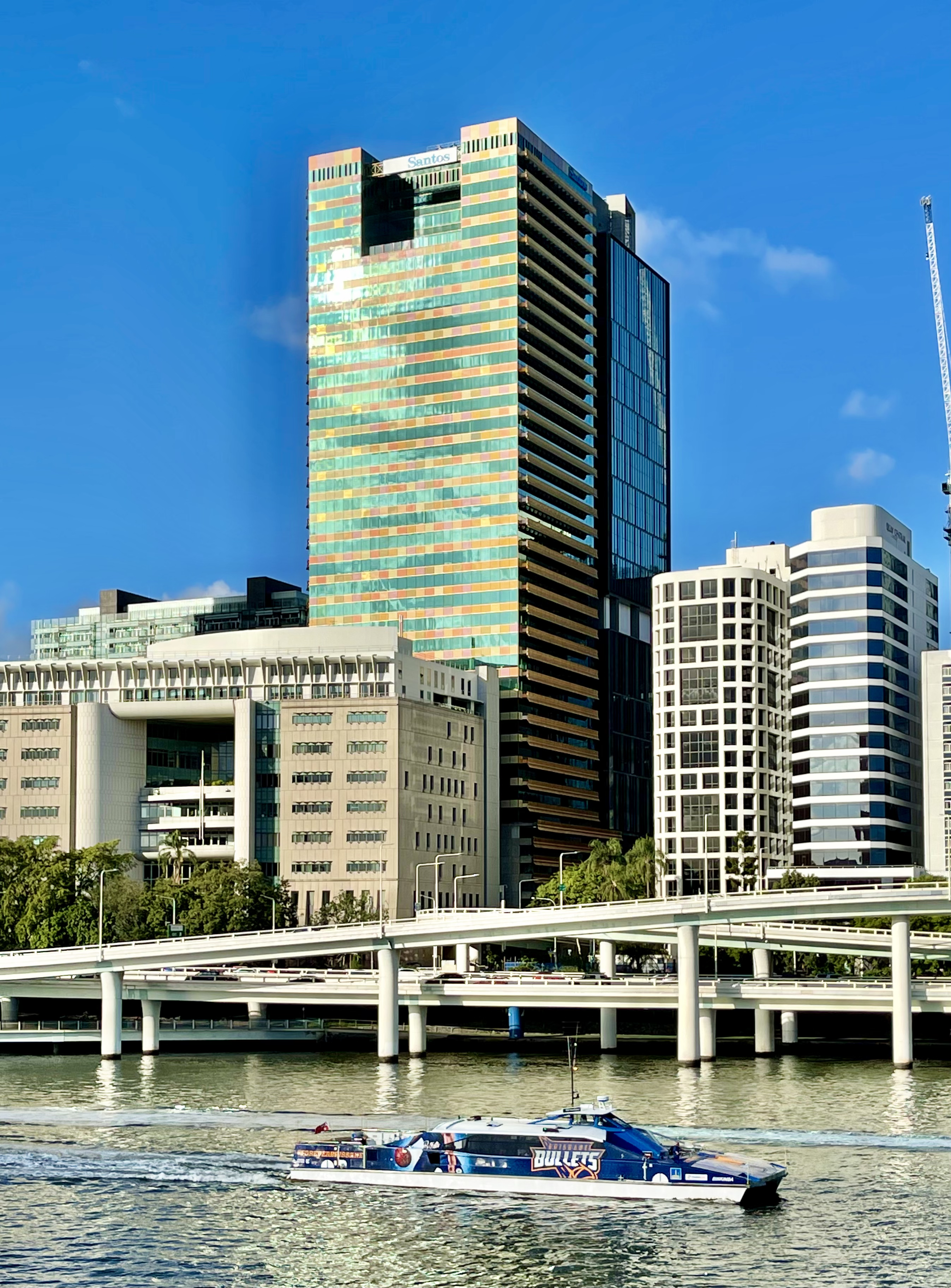
- Interactive map of the Santos Place area

General information
- Status: Completed
- Type: Office
- Location: 32 Turbot Street; Brisbane, Qld
- Coordinates: 27°28′07″S 153°01′15″E
- Construction started: 2007
- Completed: 2009
- Opening: 2009
- Cost: A$270 million
- Operator: Nielson Properties

Height
- Roof: 150 m (490 ft)

Technical details
- Floor count: 38
- Floor area: 33,000 m^{2} (360,000 sq ft)

Design and construction
- Architect: Donovan Hill
- Developer: Nielson Properties
- Structural engineer: Alliance Design Group
- Main contractor: Hutchinson Builders

Santos Place is a commercial office building in the central business district of Brisbane, Queensland, Australia. Construction began in 2007 and was completed in 2009. It was formerly known as Northbridge before the Australian oil and gas exploration company Santos purchased naming rights in January 2009. Santos occupies eight levels. The building has a 6-star rating on the Green Star sustainability scale.

== Location ==
Alongside 400 George and 275 George St, Santos Place forms part of the North Quarter Precinct in Brisbane's CBD. A major feature of the building is its direct link with the Kurilpa Bridge which extends over the Brisbane River to the Gallery of Modern Art and South Bank cultural precinct.

The building is near central transport links such as the Roma Street railway station as well as Brisbane's Busway with access at King George Square and Queen Street Mall. The building is also close to major shopping precincts such as Queen Street Mall, Wintergarden and Elizabeth Street all of which feature shopping, restaurants, bars, and nightclubs.

== Design ==
Santos Place was designed by Donovan Hill Architect, and constructed by Hutchinson Builders (in a Design & Construct procurement method). The total cost of the building's construction is A$270 million and it provides 33 000 m2 of floor area. Santos Place is Australia's largest building to receive a 6 star green building design rating. It features energy efficiency measures such as "high performance double glazing, substantial external sun shading, state of the art ventilation and an energy-efficient gas-powered trigeneration system". Sensored lighting switches off automatically if no movement is detected after five minutes. Rainwater is collected on the roof and stored in tanks on the top of the building. Construction of the building was done with 20% recycled concrete and 90% recycled steel. It includes a two-level gymnasium and 280 secured basement bicycle parks.

== See also ==
- Green building in Australia
- List of tallest buildings in Australia
- List of tallest buildings in Brisbane
