= The Arusha Hotel =

Coordinates: 2.3731°S 36.6947°E

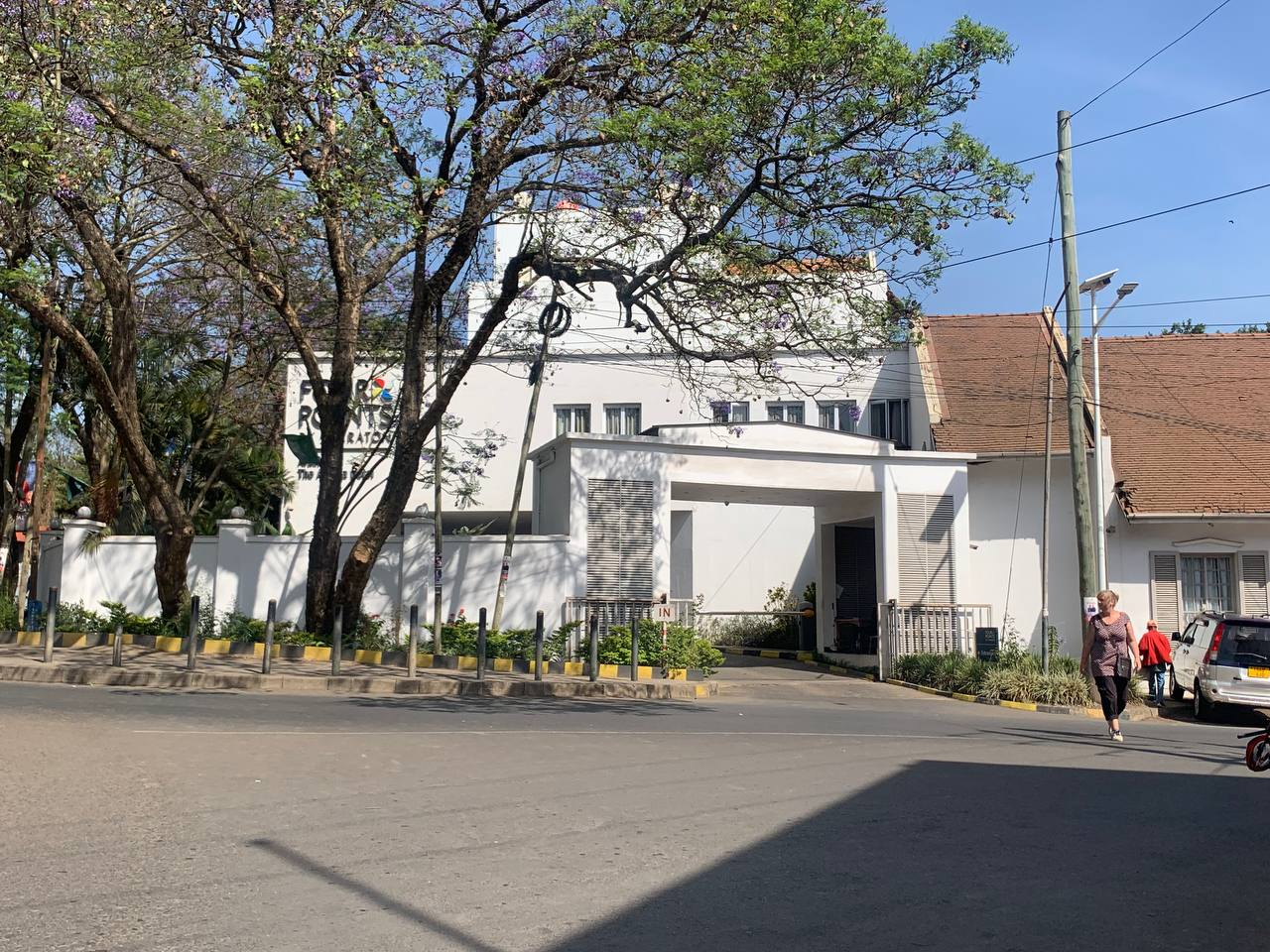
- Interactive map of the The Arusha Hotel area

General information
- Type: Hotel
- Location: Arusha, Tanzania
- Opened: 1894

Website
- www.marriott.com/en-us/hotels/jrofp-four-points-arusha-the-arusha-hotel/

The Arusha Hotel is a four-star hotel located in Arusha, Northern Tanzania. Built in 1894, it is one of the oldest hotels in East Africa. The hotel is located near the Arusha Clock Tower, which was built to designate the midway point of the 10,000 km distance between Cairo and Cape Town. Since 2017, the hotel has been operated under Marriott International's Four Points by Sheraton brand as Four Points by Sheraton Arusha, The Arusha Hotel.
