= Theodore Lenzen =

Prussian-American architect (1833–1912)

Theodore Lenzen (1833–1912) was a Prussian-born American architect. He was prolific with architectural designs in San Jose, California, during the late 19th century. He was part of the firm Theodore Lenzen & Son, with his son Louis T. Lenzen.

== Biography ==
Lenzen was born in Prussia on September 29, 1833. His parents were Gertrude (née Morsch), and Nicholas Lenzen. His brother Jacob was an architect, and his brother Michael worked as a contractor and painter. Starting at age 15, Lenzen apprenticed as a builder.

Lenzen moved to the United States at the age of 21 (c. 1854), initially settling in Chicago. He arrived in San Francisco on January 24, 1861, where he lived for one year and worked on improving his building skills. A year later he relocated to Santa Clara, in order to design Santa Clara College (now Santa Clara University). Lenzen is responsible for designing over 500 buildings during his career, in places including Salinas, California; El Paso, Texas; Hollister, California; Santa Cruz, California; Gilroy, California; Sacramento, California; and Los Angeles, California.

He died on October 20, 1912, in San Jose, and was buried in Oak Hill Memorial Park cemetery. The Lenzen Street name in San Jose, California is the location of his former home, and Theodore Lenzen Park on Lenzen Street are both named in his honor.

== Notable building designs ==
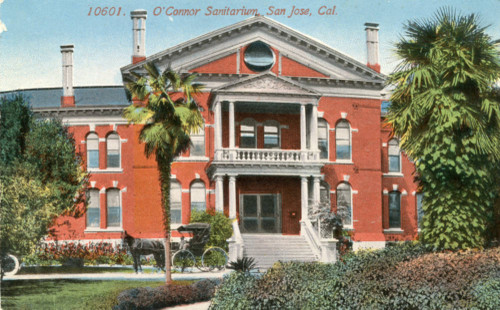
The former O'Connor Sanitarium, erected in 1888 and designed by architect Theodore Lenzen. It was demolished in 1955, after the hospital moved to its present location.

- St. Ignatius College, Market Street (c. 1861), San Francisco, California
- Santa Clara College (now Santa Clara University) (1862), Santa Clara, California
- Fredericksburg Brewery (1875), at Alameda de las Pulgas and Julian Street, San Jose, California; it was the largest brewery on the west coast and is now gone.
- O'Connor Sanitarium (now O'Connor Hospital) (1888), San Jose, California; demolished in 1955.
- Louis Auzerais House (1889), 155 East Empire Street, Hensley Historic District, San Jose, California
- San Joses City Hall (1889–1958), at Market and San Fernando Streets, San Jose, California; the original building was demolished and a plaque remains.
- San Jose Normal School (now San Jose State University), San Jose, California; the original main school building burned down and the associated student house remains.
- California Wesleyan College (now University of the Pacific; located at the now-Bellarmine College Preparatory school campus), 960 West Hedding Street, College Park neighborhood, San Jose, California; the original buildings are gone.
- Oak Street School, San Jose, California
- Franklin Engine House, San Jose, California
- George B. McKee and Company, San Jose, California
- Union Savings Bank building, San Jose, California
- College of Notre Dame (now Notre Dame de Namur University), Belmont, California
- Centella Chapel at Centella Methodist Episcopal Church, San Jose, California
- Historic Scheller House, San Jose, California
