= Four Points by Sheraton =

Hotel chain

- Industry: Hospitality, Tourism
- Founded: 1995; 31 years ago
- Number of locations: 308 (September 2020)
- Area served: Worldwide
- Parent: Marriott International
- Website: Four Points by Sheraton; Four Points Flex by Sheraton

Four Points by Sheraton is an American multinational select service hotel brand operated by Marriott International that targets business travelers and small conventions. As of June 30, 2020, Marriott operated 291 properties worldwide under the Four Points by Sheraton brand, with 53,054 rooms. In addition, Marriott had 130 planned hotels with 27,342 additional rooms. It also includes the sub-brand Four Points Flex by Sheraton.

== History ==
In April 1995, ITT Sheraton introduced the Four Points by Sheraton brand, to replace the designation of certain hotels as Sheraton Inns. During the early 2000s, this mid-scale, moderate-rate, full-service hotel brand operated around 135 properties, across about 15 countries, but primarily in the US.

In 1998, Starwood acquired ITT Sheraton. In 2000, Starwood relaunched Four Points by Sheraton as a premier upscale hotel chain for business and leisure travelers. The hotels initiated a Best Brews program that offers an opportunity to sample local craft beers.

In September 2016, Marriott acquired the Four Points by Sheraton brand as part of its purchase of Starwood. After the takeover, Marriott identified properties which did not meet brand standards, which were required to either renovate, or exit the brand.

== Four Points Flex by Sheraton ==
In September 2023, Marriott announced Four Points Express by Sheraton, a new limited-service spinoff brand of Four Points by Sheraton, targeting the mid-range market in Europe, the Middle East and Africa. Its first property opened in London in 2024. In late 2024, Four Points Express was renamed Four Points Flex by Sheraton. As of November 2026, the brand has 67 locations worldwide, in countries including England, Denmark, Japan and Turkey.

== Notable properties ==
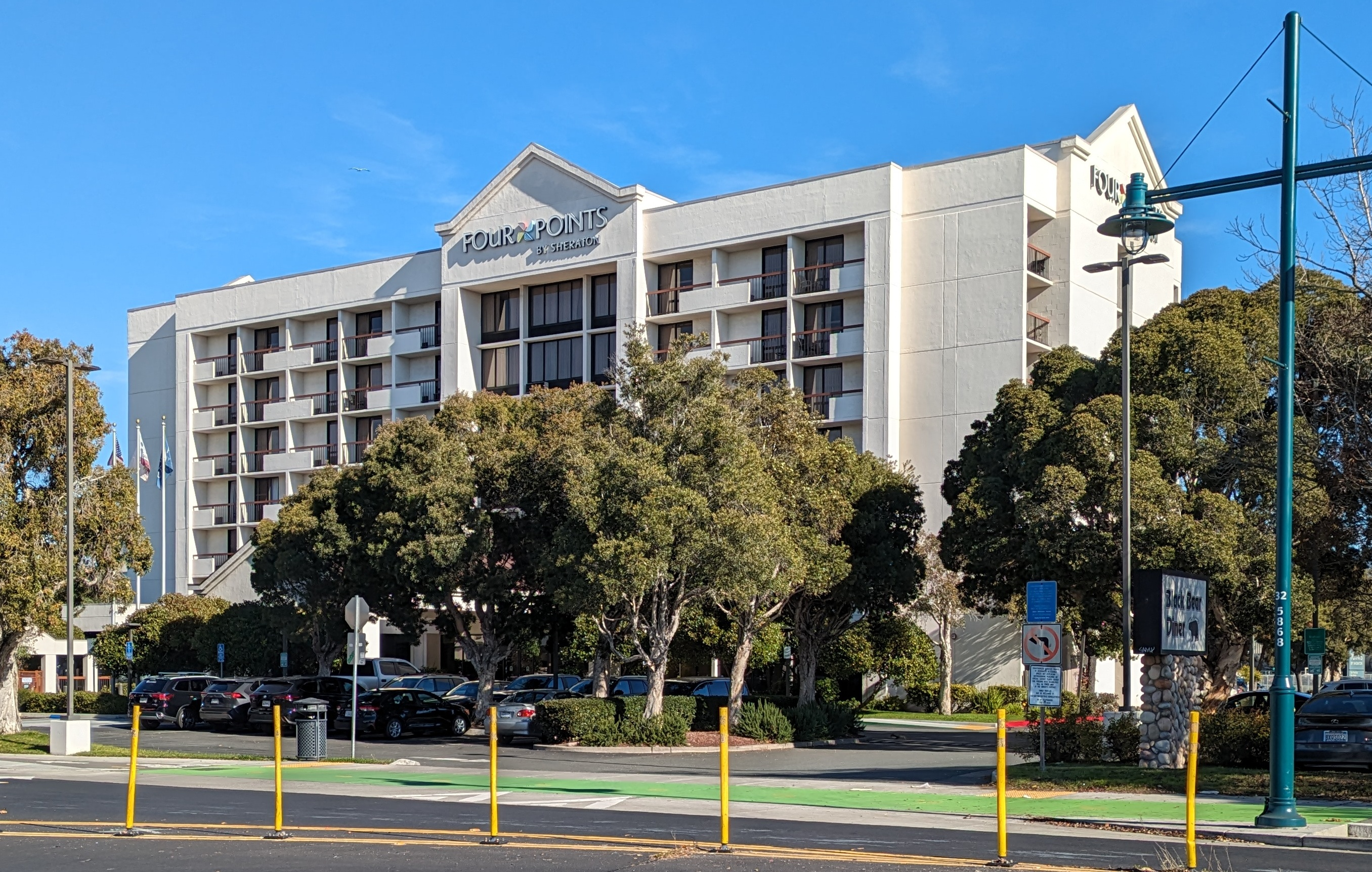
Four Points by Sheraton in Emeryville

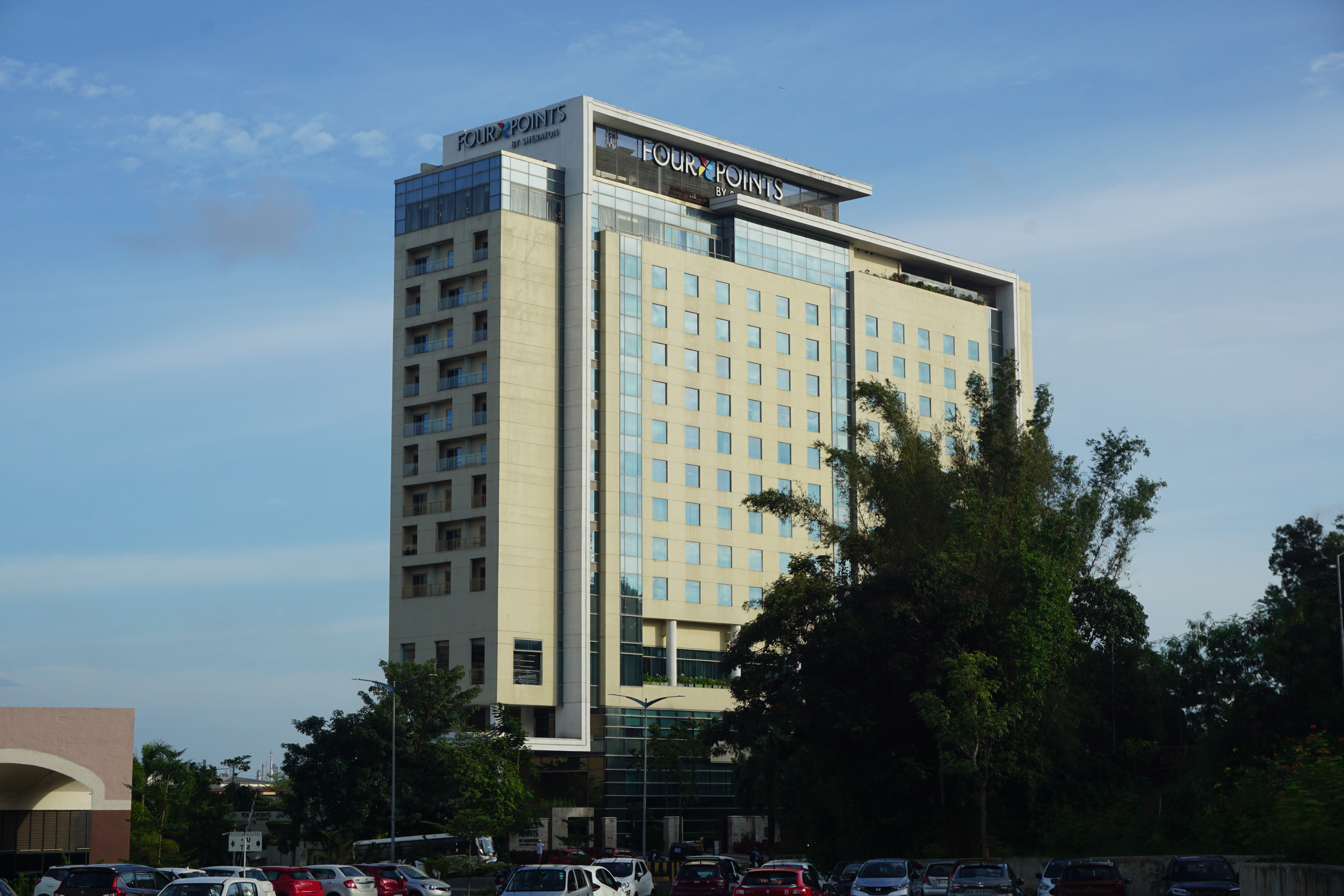
Four Points by Sheraton in Kochi

- Arusha, Tanzania: Four Points assumed management of the historic Arusha Hotel in 2017. Established in 1894, it is one of the oldest hotels in East Africa.
- Brisbane, Australia: The Four Points by Sheraton Brisbane is located near the City Botanic Gardens and the Parliament House.
- Dubai, United Arab Emirates: The Four Points by Sheraton Sheikh Zayed Road, Dubai, at 43 stories high, is one of the tallest hotels in Dubai. Originally a planned residential complex, it was turned into a hotel midway through development and opened in 2007.
- Havana, Cuba: The Four Points by Sheraton Havana, a conversion of the existing Hotel Quinta Avenida, became the first US-managed hotel in Cuba since 1960, when it opened in June 2016 during the Cuban thaw. On June 5, 2020, Marriott was ordered by the U.S. Treasury to cease management of the hotel by August 31, after the Trump administration suspended Marriott's license to operate in Cuba.
- Munich, Germany: The Arabella Hochhaus, previously operated as a Sheraton for over twenty years, was downgraded to become Four Points by Sheraton Munich Arabellapark in 2022, due to the hotel's anticipated demolition in 2030.
- Riyadh, Saudi Arabia: The Four Points by Sheraton Riyadh Khaldia, formerly the Mena Grand Khaldia Hotel, was acquired by Starwood in 2013. It is located in the Riyadh neighborhood of Al Dirah.
- San Jose, United States: The historic Hotel Montgomery began to be operated as a Four Points following its 2004 reopening. Its original location in its immediate north is currently occupied by the Signia by Hilton San Jose.

== Accommodations ==
		North America	Europe	Middle E. & Africa	Asia & Pacific	Caribbean Latin Am.	Total
2016	Properties	132	14	8	54	19	227
2016	Rooms	20,130	2,202	1,943	13,815	2,583	40,673
2017	Properties	141	17	11	60	20	249
2017	Rooms	21,612	2,552	2,319	14,823	2,674	43,980
2018	Properties	152	20	12	67	20	271
2018	Rooms	23,015	3,042	3,451	16,951	2,685	49,144
2019	Properties	159	18	17	75	20	289
2019	Rooms	23,847	2,778	4,371	18,561	2,686	52,243
2020	Properties	158	19	16	83	19	295
2020	Rooms	23,836	2,913	4,058	21,636	2,500	54,943
2021	Properties	160	19	18	84	19	300
2021	Rooms	24,146	3,070	4,500	22,040	2,513	56,269
2022	Properties	159	19	21	89	18	306
2022	Rooms	24,058	3,291	5,113	23,133	2,332	57,927
2023	Properties	154	20	21	96	18	309
2023	Rooms	22,965	3,284	5,136	25,255	2,332	58,972
