= Hensley Historic District =

- U.S. National Register of Historic Places
- U.S. Historic district
- Northside Residential District; Hensley Park
- California Historical Landmark
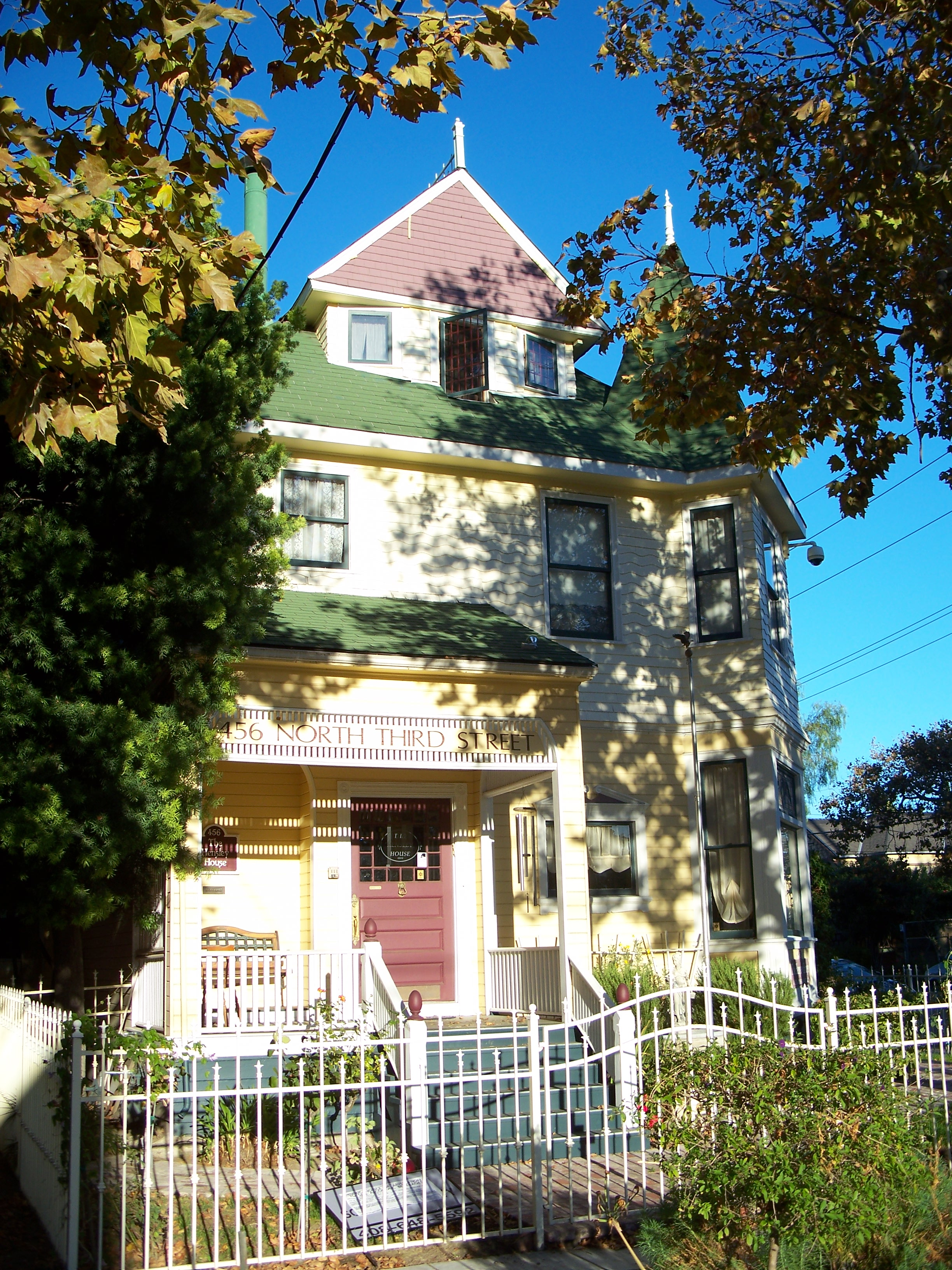
- Hensley House

- Location within San Jose, California Location within California
- Location: San Jose, Santa Clara County, California, United States
- Coordinates: 37.345153°N 121.894022°W
- Area: 59 acres (24 ha)
- NRHP reference No.: 83001238
- CHISL No.: N1193

Significant dates
- Added to NRHP: June 21, 1983
- Designated CHISL: June 21, 1983

The Hensley Historic District, also known as Northside Residential District, is a U.S. historic district and residential neighborhood in San Jose, California. The neighborhood is northeast of downtown and is roughly bounded by East Julian Street, North 1st Street, North 7th Street, and East Empire Street. It is listed as a California Historical Landmark since June 21, 1983; and is listed as one of the National Register of Historic Places (NRHP) since June 21, 1983.

== History ==
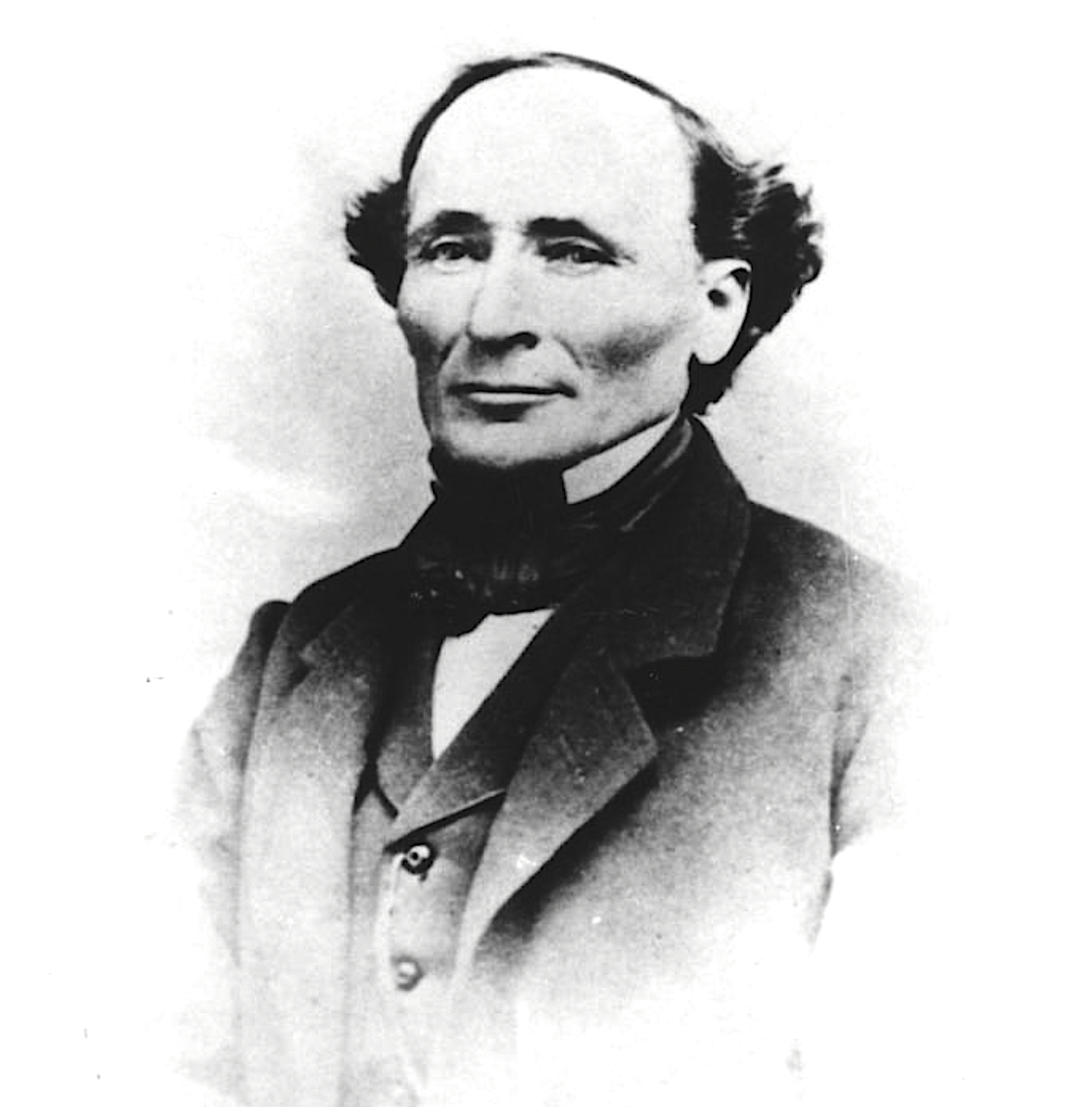
Major Samuel J. Hensley (1850)

The Hensley Historic District is named after Helen Mary (née Crosby; 1831–1917) and Samuel J. Hensley (c. 1816–1866), they were active during the early formation of the state and in the Bear Flag Revolt. The Hensley name is also used for the street in San Jose, and the downtown "Hensley Block" at Market and Santa Clara Streets.

The neighborhood contains 279 properties many of which were homes constructed between 1865 and 1930 and are late 19th-century Victorian architecture. There are 207 properties in the area contributing to the NHRP listing for architecture. The district contains buildings of different architectural styles: Italianate, Queen Anne, Victorian Gothic, Eastlake, Neoclassical, and Dutch Colonial Revival.

The "Hensley House" (1891 or 1901), formerly known as the "Luis L. Arguello House", or "Arguello Gosbey House", is a two and half-story Queen Anne style house with a turret, located at 456 North 3rd Street in the center of the neighborhood. In the 1920s, the "Hensley House" building was part of the San Jose Normal School campus (now San Jose State University).

In 2006, it was considered one of the most expensive real estate neighborhoods in the United States by the National Association of Realtors.

== Architectural landmarks ==
- Hensley House (1891 or 1901), 456 North 3rd Street, San Jose, California
- C.W. Gerichs House (1891), 467 North 3rd Street, San Jose, California; by architect J.O. McKee
- Louis Auzerais House (1889), 155 East Empire Street, San Jose, California; by architect Theodore Lenzen

== See also ==
- California Historical Landmarks in Santa Clara County
- National Register of Historic Places listings in Santa Clara County, California
- Pierson B. Reading
