= Circle of Palms Plaza =

Plaza in San Jose, California, US

Coordinates: 37.33343°N 121.889627°W

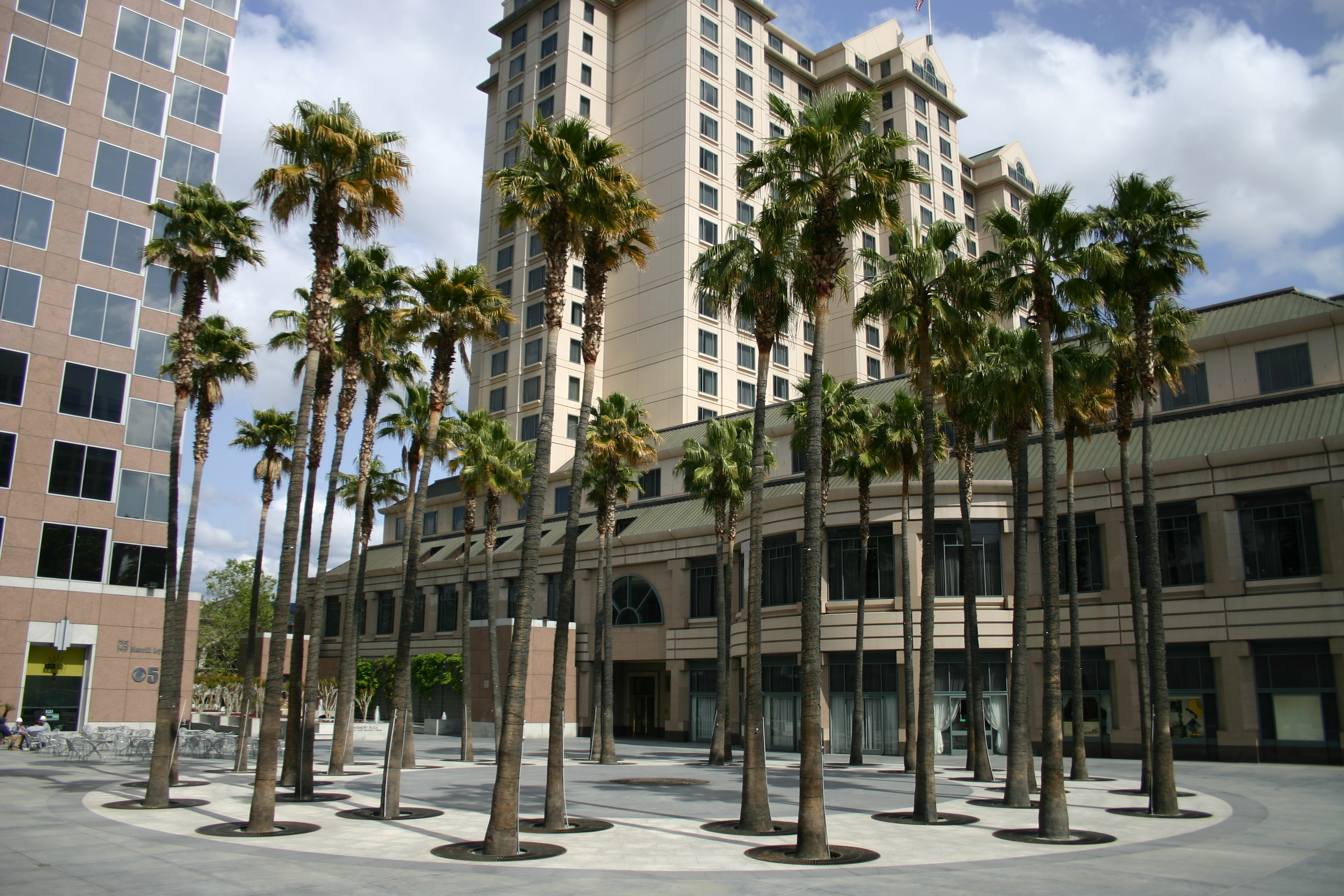
- Circle of Palms Plaza with the Fairmont San Jose and Fairmont Plaza

- Area: 2.3-acre (9,000 m^{2})
- Location: San Jose, California

Site of California's First State Capital

California Historical Landmark
- Official name: Site of California's First State Capital
- Designated: August 30, 1950
- Reference no.: 461

The Circle of Palms Plaza is located in downtown San Jose, California. It is composed of a ring of palm trees encircling a California State Seal, and designates the California Historical Marker 461, the site of California's first state capital from 1849 to 1851.

== History ==
When California became part of the US in 1850, San Jose was the oldest civilian settlement dating back to its establishment in 1777, and selected the first official state capital of California. A two-story adobe hotel built around 1830 became the first state capitol and hosted the first legislative sessions in 1850 and 1851. The capitol site is designated as California Historical Marker 461. From 1866 to 1887, the Market Street Chinatown occupied the entire block. The settlement was the center of Chinese-American life in the Santa Clara Valley, until it was destroyed by arson. The site was redeveloped into a plaza in the 1980s.

== Description ==
The Circle of Palms Plaza is a ring of palm trees encircling a California State Seal, located between the Fairmont San Jose Hotel, the KQED building (Silicon Valley Financial Center) and the San Jose Museum of Art. The concrete around the state seal contains quotes from the 1849 state constitutional convention in Monterey where San Jose was chosen as the capital.

== Public activities ==
Each Winter, the San Jose Downtown Association sets up an outdoor ice rink called "San Jose Downtown Ice" at the Circle of Palms.

== Landmark status ==
On August 30, 1950, the State Historic Preservation Office designated the site of California's first state capital as a California historical landmark #461. A description on the commemorative plaque reads: " Directly opposite this tablet was located the first State Capitol Building, in which California's first Legislature assembled in December 1849. San Jose was the seat of government from 1849 to 1851."

== Photo gallery ==
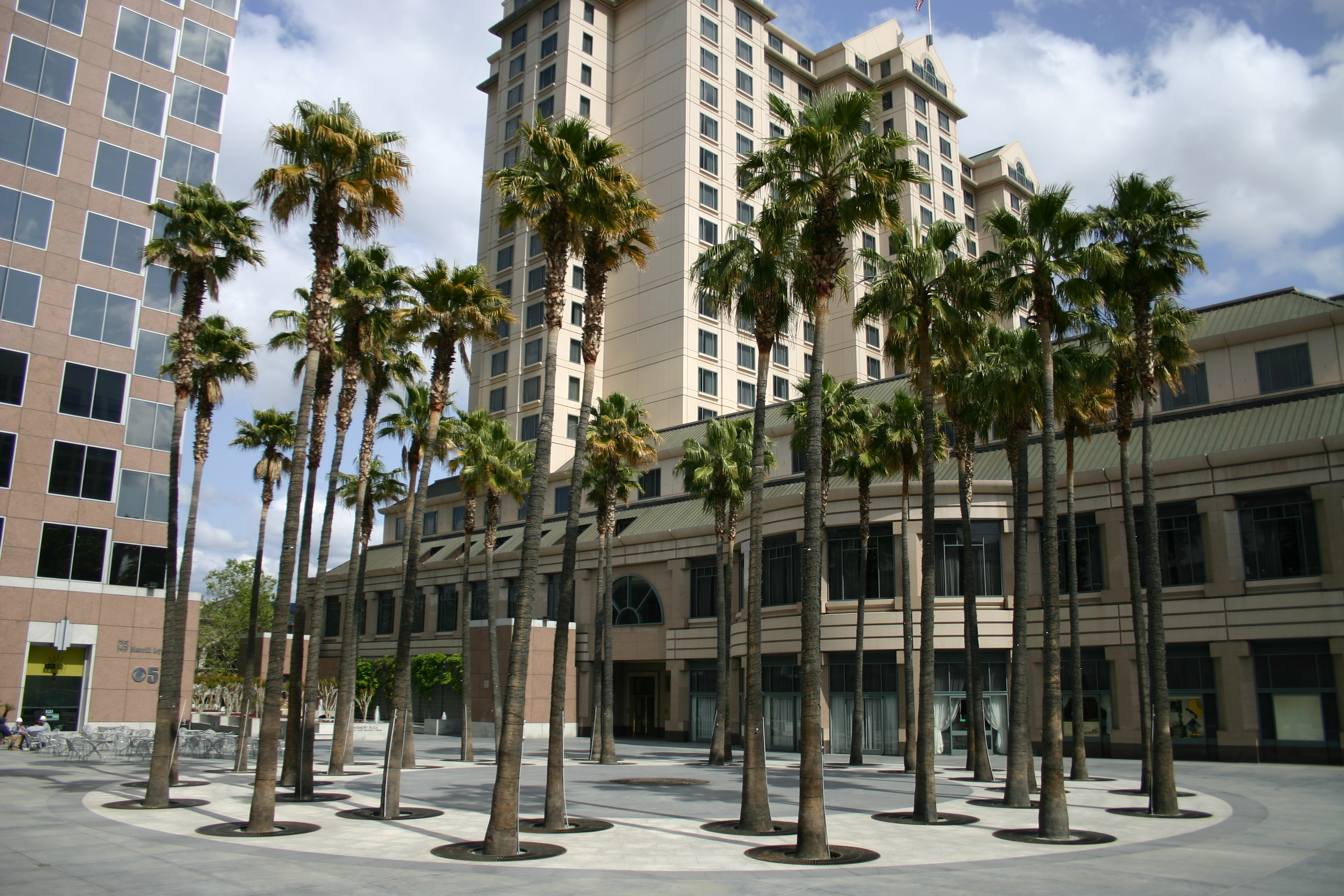
Circle of Palms Plaza

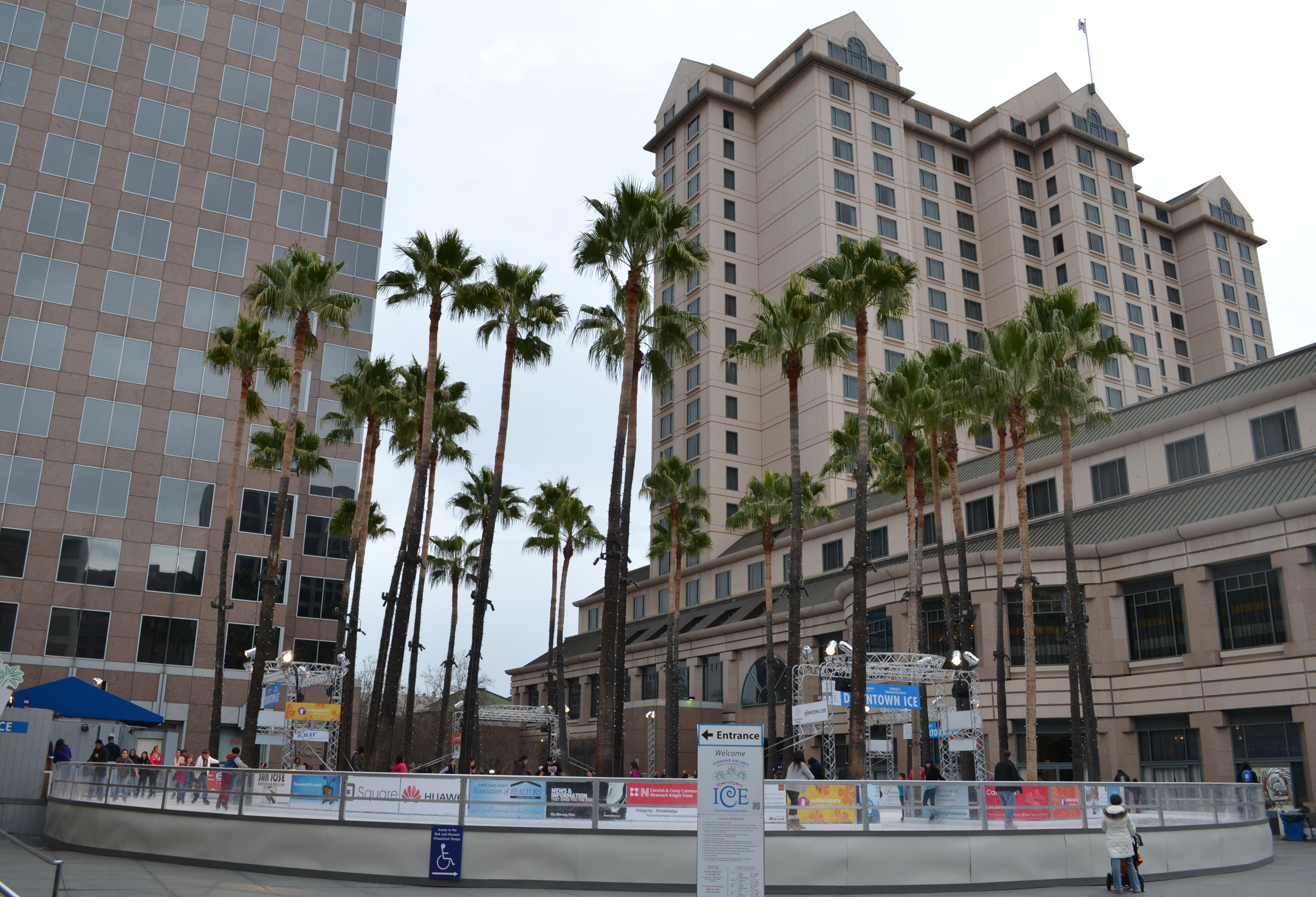
The ice rink at the plaza in the Winter

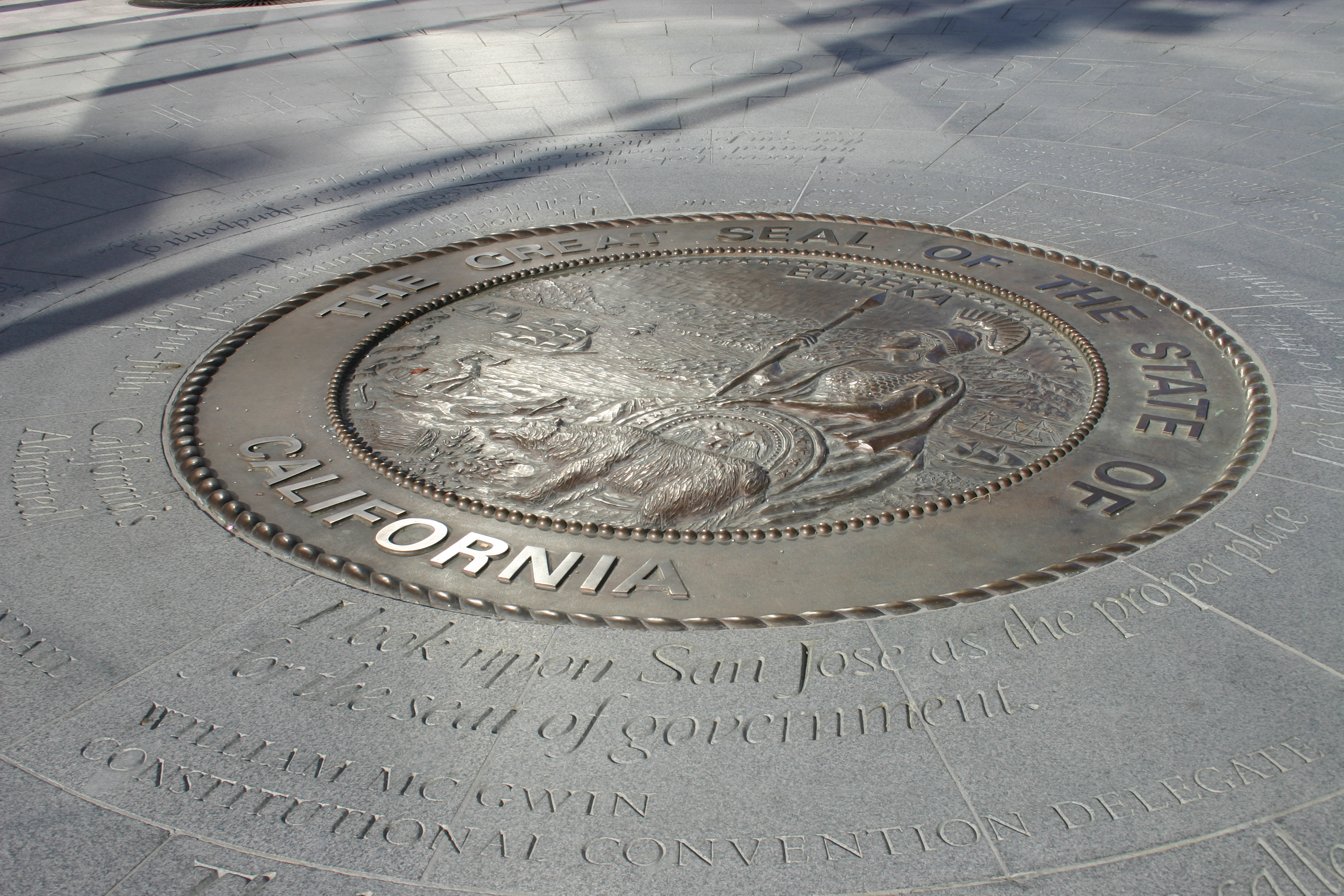
State seal at center of the Circle of Palms

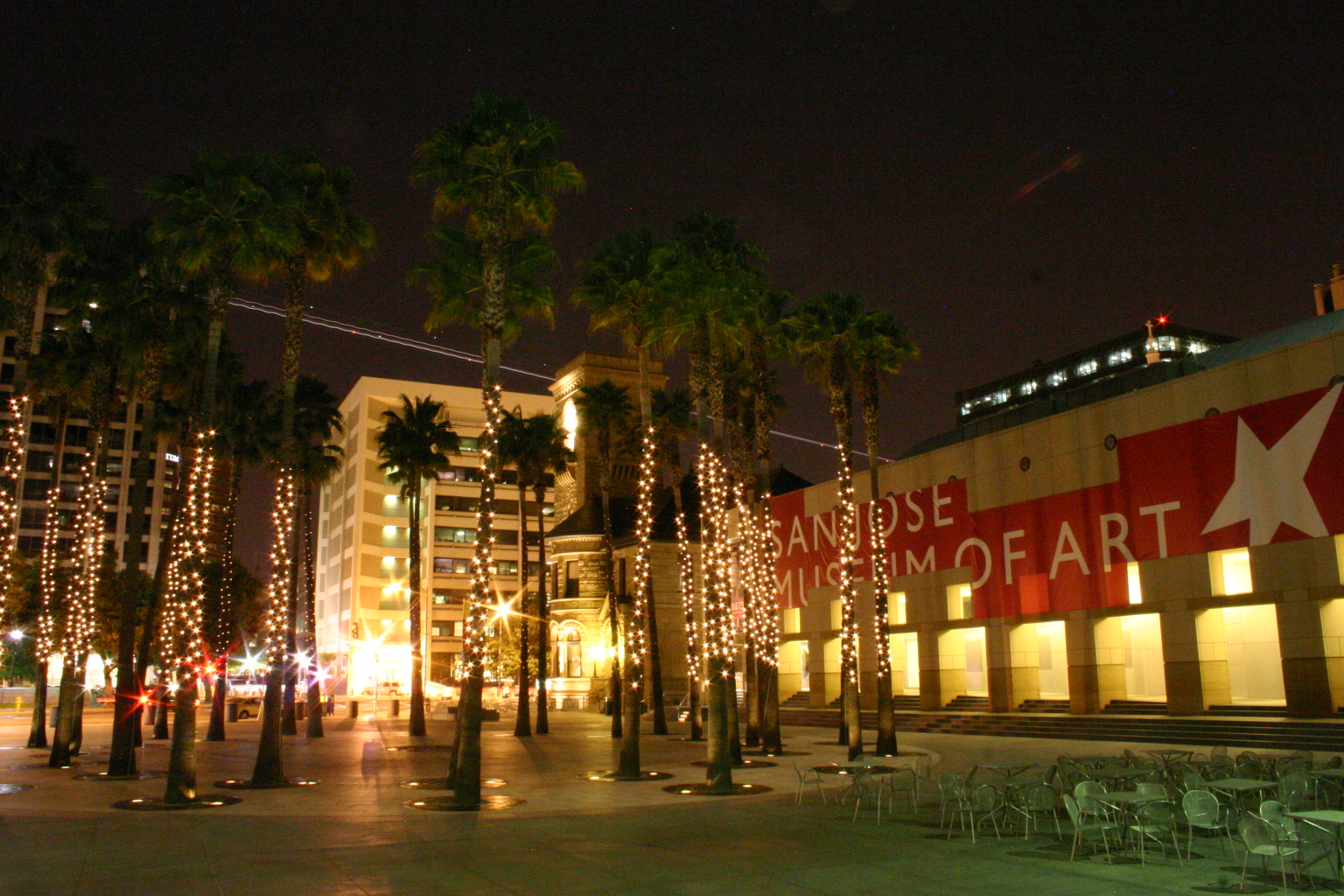
Night view of the Circle of Palms Plaza and the San Jose Museum of Art

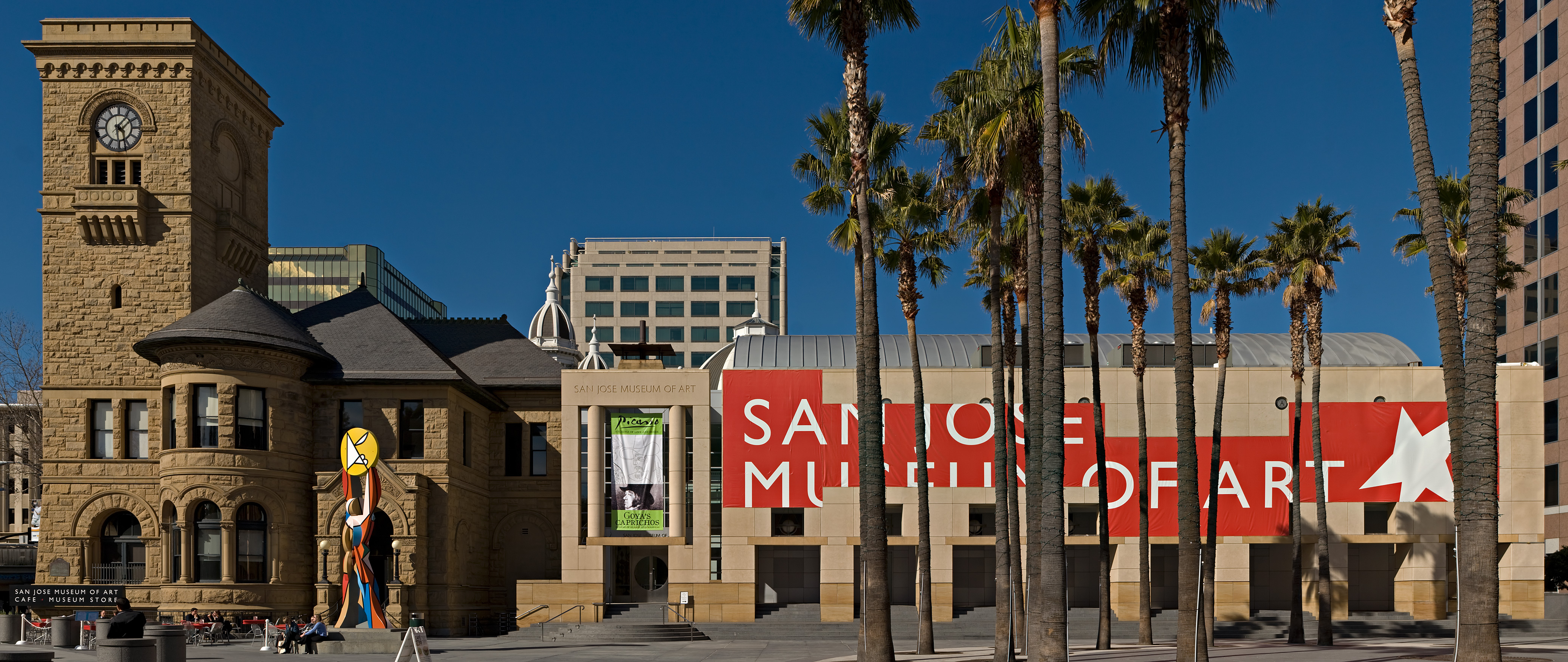
San Jose Museum of Art and Circle of Palms

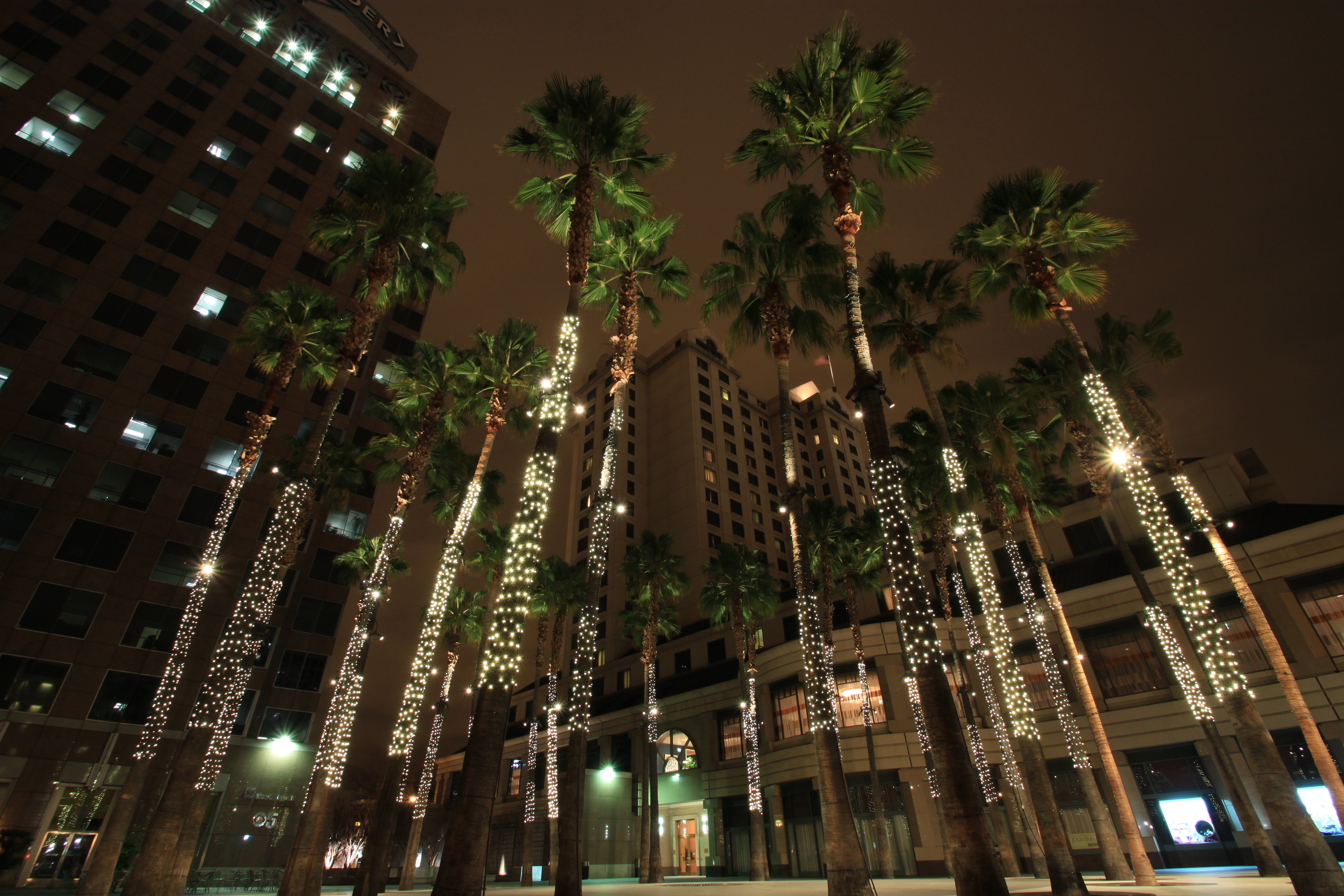
Circle of Palms Plaza and Fairmont at Night

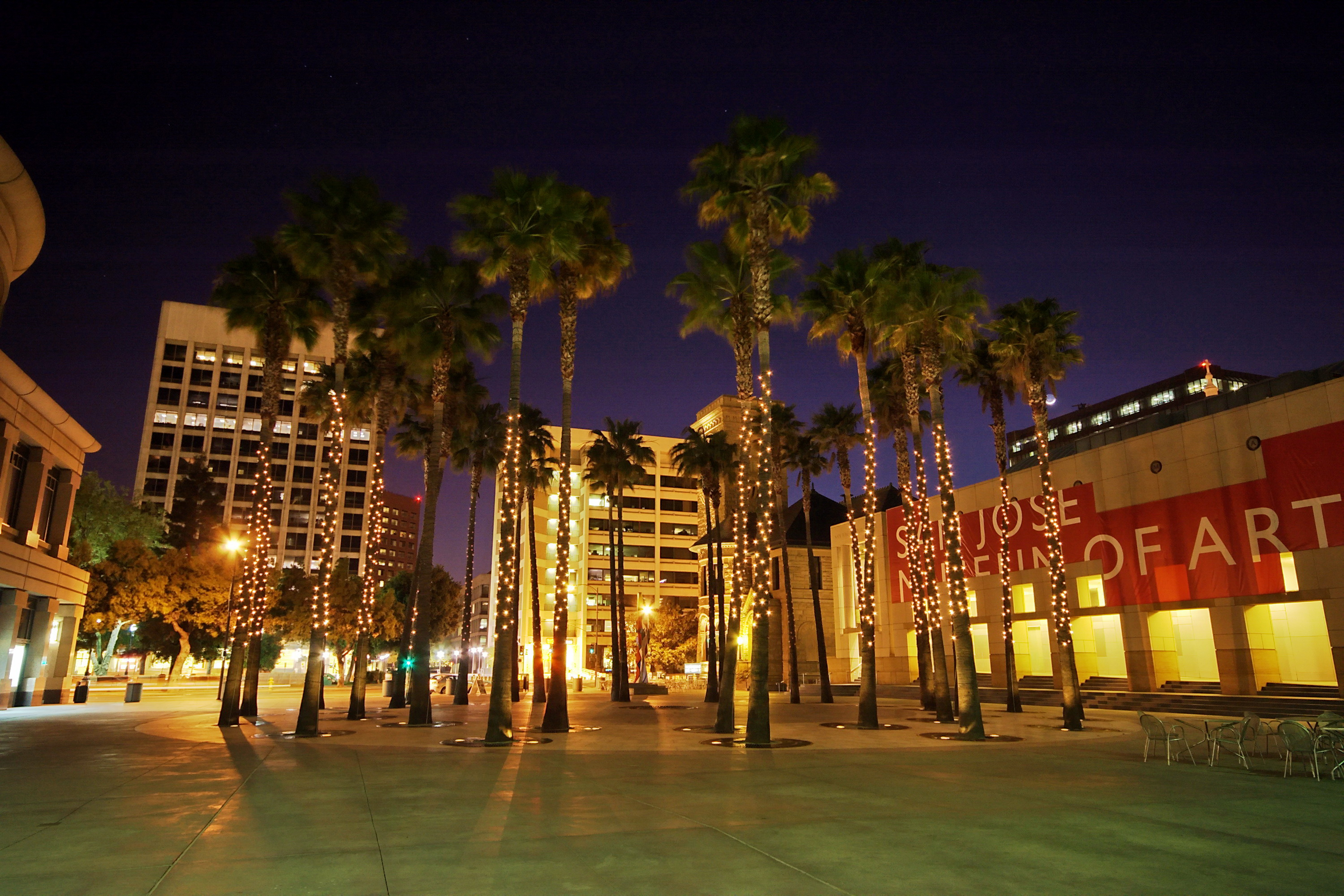
Circle of Palms and San Jose Museum of Art

== See also ==
- History of San Jose, California
- List of California Historical Landmarks
