= LR&M Constructions =

LR&M Constructions Pty Ltd
- Founded: 1966; 59 years ago in Gawler, South Australia, Australia
- Founders: John Chamberlain and his parents Lionel and Miriam
- Headquarters: Roseworthy, South Australia, Australia
- Revenue: A$30 million (2016)
- Number of employees: 75 (2016)
- Parent: Chamberlain Group of Companies
- Website: lrmcon.com

LR&M Constructions is a South Australian construction and civil engineering company. It was established in Gawler in 1966 and is involved in construction projects in South Australia including part of the Northern Connector freeway.

The company had 75 staff and annual turnover of A$30 million in 2016. It specialises in construction of housing developments, airport runways, wetlands and golf courses. It moved from Gawler to larger premises at Roseworthy in 2008.

The founding directors were Lionel Chamberlain, Ronald Chamberlain (otherwise better known to many by his second name of John), and Miriam Chamberlain.
