= San Jose Redevelopment Agency =

The San Jose Redevelopment Agency (SJRA, officially the Redevelopment Agency for the City of San José) was a redevelopment agency in the government of San Jose, California. It was created in 1956 and grew into the second-largest tax increment financing agency in the state.

The agency's 21 development project areas covered about 16% of the city's area and accounted for a third of the jobs in the city. It led the redevelopment of Downtown San Jose. It also cofounded the US Market Access Center and San Jose BioCenter as joint ventures with San Jose State University. During the 1990s and 2000s, the tightened real estate market impaired the agency's efforts to relocate businesses that were in the way of development projects such as San Jose City Hall.

The agency was dissolved along with the state's other redevelopment agencies on February 1, 2012. In its place, the Successor Agency to the San José Redevelopment Agency (SARA) managed the wind-down of the agency's affairs.

== See also ==
- Team San Jose
- San Francisco Redevelopment Agency
