= Timeline of San Jose, California =

Coordinates: 37.333333°N 121.9°W

The following is a timeline of the history of San Jose, California, United States.

== Prior to the 19th century ==
- 1777 – Spanish pueblo San Jose de Guadalupe founded.
- 1797 – San Jose mission founded.

== 19th century ==
- 1803 – San Jose de Guadalupe church built.
- 1805 – Mission San Jose's church built in 1805, not 1803, and named La Mission del Gloriosisimo Patriarch San Jose, or just Mission San Jose, but not San Jose de Guadalupe according to San Jose Mission's history page.
- 1809 – Mission San Jose's church completed and dedicated.
- 1822 – Mexicans in power.
- 1840 – Population: 750 (approximate).
- 1846 – Town occupied by U.S. forces.
- 1849 – December: Town becomes capital of the new state of California.
- 1850
  - City chartered.
  - Josiah Belden becomes mayor.
  - San Francisco-San Jose stagecoach begins operating.
- 1851
  - San Jose Weekly Visitor newspaper begins publication.
  - College of Notre Dame established.
- 1852 – San Jose Foundry in business.
- 1853 – Hook and Ladder Company No.1 organized.
- 1855
  - San Jose Telegraph newspaper begins publication.
  - San Jose City Hall built on North Market Street.
- 1856 – Young Men's Literary Association organized.
- 1857 – Minn's Evening School established.
- 1861 – San Jose Daily Mercury newspaper begins publication.
- 1862 – California State Normal School founded.
- 1864 – San Francisco-San Jose Railway in operation.
- 1865 – St. Joseph High School established.
- 1866 – Santa Clara Argus newspaper begins publication.
- 1867 – San Jose YMCA established.
- 1868 – St. Joseph's Church built (approximate date).
- 1870
  - California State Normal School relocated to San Jose.
  - Chinatown fire.
  - Population: 9,089; county 26,246.
- 1871 – University of the Pacific relocated to San Jose vicinity.
- 1875 – San Jose Law Library, San Jose Fruit Packing Company, and the California Pioneers of Santa Clara County established.
- 1878 – Home of Benevolence founded.
- 1879 – Daily Morning Times begins publication.
- 1886 – Board of Trade organized.
- 1888 – Lick Observatory established atop Mount Hamilton.
- 1889
  - New San Jose City Hall built in Market Plaza.
  - O'Connor Hospital and Hotel Vendome established.
- 1890 – Population: 18,060.
- 1891 – Heald College established.
- 1892 – First Unitarian Church of San Jose built.
- 1892 – We and Our Neighbors Clubhouse (women's club) founded.
- 1894
  - Associated Charities of San Jose established.
  - Washburn Preparatory School established
- 1895 – Post Office built.
- 1897 – Good Government League organized.
- 1900 – Population: 21,500.

== 20th century ==
=== 1900s–1950s ===
- 1902 – Naglee Park development begins (approximate date).
- 1903
  - Grauman's Theatre and San Jose Public Library building open.
  - Bean Spray Company relocates to San Jose.
- 1905 – Balloon, dirigible, and aeroplane exhibitions.
- 1906 – April 18: San Francisco earthquake.
- 1909
  - KQW radio begins broadcasting.
  - Santa Clara Valley Fruit Growers Association organized.
- 1911 – East San Jose becomes part of San Jose.
- 1921 – San Jose Junior College founded.
- 1926 – Bank of Italy Building constructed.
- 1927 – Fox California Theatre built.
- 1930 – Hotel Vendome is closed and demolished
- 1933
  - November 26: Hart killers lynched in St. James Park.
  - Spartan Stadium opens.
- 1936 – Willow Glen becomes part of San Jose.
- 1937 – San Jose Civic Orchestra formed.
- 1943 – IBM west coast headquarters established.
- 1949
  - San Jose Municipal Airport begins operating.
  - Burbank Theatre, Garden Theatre, and Mayfair cinema open.
  - Historical Museum of San José established.
- 1950s – Community Service Organization activity begins in East San Jose.
- 1952 – Population: 95,280.
- 1957 – San Jose Peace & Justice Center founded.
- 1958 – New San Jose City Hall opened at Civic Center.
- 1959 – Santa Clara County United Fund established.

=== 1960s–1990s ===
- 1960 – Population: 204,196.
- 1961
  - Happy Hollow Zoo opens.
  - IBM Shoebox invented.
- 1964 – San Jose Century 21 cinema built.
- 1967 – Junior League of San Jose and Center for Employment Training established.
- 1968 – Alviso becomes part of city.
- 1969 – Century Theatre cinema opens.
- 1970
  - Regional Metropolitan Transportation Commission established.
  - Population: 447,025.
- 1971
  - Norman Mineta becomes mayor.
  - San José Historical Museum Association and Sourisseau Academy for State and Local History established.
- 1972 – Food Machinery Corporation headquarters relocates from San Jose to Chicago.
- 1973 – Willow Glen Neighborhood Association formed.
- 1974 – Santa Clara County Transportation Agency, San Jose Earthquakes soccer club, and Second Harvest Food Bank established.
- 1975
  - Evergreen Valley College active.
  - Janet Gray Hayes becomes mayor.
- 1977 – San Jose Museum of Quilts & Textiles founded.
- 1980 – Rotary Club of San Jose and San Jose Repertory Theatre founded.
- 1981 – Roman Catholic Diocese of San Jose established.
- 1982 – Adobe in business.
- 1983
  - 1983 San Jose School District California bankruptcy
  - Tom McEnery becomes mayor.
- 1985 – Market Post Tower built.
- 1986
  - First Community Housing and San Jose Cleveland Ballet founded.
  - IBM Almaden Research Center opens.
- 1987
  - Japanese American Museum of San Jose, Chinese Historical and Cultural Project, and Los Fundadores y Amigos de Alta California established.
  - Fairmont Hotel built.
- 1988 – Fairmont Plaza built.
- 1989 – Loma Prieta earthquake.
- 1990
  - Tech Museum of Innovation and San Jose International Airport's new terminal open.
  - Population: 782,248.
- 1991
  - Tathagata Meditation Center, Santa Clara Valley MultiService Center, and Filipino American National Historical Society chapter founded.
  - Susan Hammer becomes mayor.
  - San Jose Sharks begin play.
- 1992
  - Saba Islamic Center active.
  - Chinmaya Mission San Jose founded.
- 1993 – Plaza Park renamed Plaza de César Chávez.
- 1994
  - City government-public computer-enabled communication ("Virtual Valley") in operation.
  - San Jose Clash soccer team formed.
- 1995
  - Pierre Omidyar launches AuctionWeb, which is later renamed eBay.
  - Zoe Lofgren becomes U.S. representative for California's 16th congressional district.
- 1998
  - City website online (approximate date).
  - History San José nonprofit incorporated.
- 1999 – Ron Gonzales becomes mayor.
- 2000 – Population: 894,943.

== 21st century ==
- 2001
  - Bay Area CyberRays soccer team, and Silicon Valley De-Bug collective established.
  - Mike Honda becomes U.S. representative for California's 15th congressional district.
- 2002 – Symphony Silicon Valley founded.
- 2003 – Sobrato Office Tower built.
- 2005 – San Jose City Hall returned downtown.
- 2006 – June: Mayor Gonzales arrested.
- 2007 – Chuck Reed becomes mayor.
- 2008 – The 88 building constructed.
- 2010
  - Three Sixty Residences built.
  - Population: 945,942.
- 2011 – October: Occupy San José begins.
- 2013 – Population: 998,537.
- 2014
  - Population tops 1,000,000.
  - December: Homeless camp cleared.
- 2021 – The San Jose shooting occurs, killing ten people including the gunman.

== See also ==
- History of San Jose, California
- List of mayors of San Jose, California
- National Register of Historic Places listings in Santa Clara County, California
- Timeline of the San Francisco Bay Area
- Timeline of California
- Timelines of other cities in the Northern California area of California: Fresno, Mountain View, Oakland, Sacramento, San Francisco

== Bibliography ==
=== Published in the 19th century ===
- Frederic Hall (1871), History of San José and surroundings, San Francisco: A.L. Bancroft and Co., OCLC 1742911, OL 6916091M
- G.H. Hare, Hare's Guide to San Jose and Vicinity for Tourists and New Settlers (San Jose, 1872)
- Luther L. Paulson (1875). Handbook and Directory of Santa Clara, San Benito, Santa Cruz, Monterey and San Mateo Counties. Comp. and pub. by L.L. Paulson.
- Bishop's Directory of the City of San Jose. San Francisco: B.C. Vandall. 1876.
- J.P. Munro-Fraser (1881). History of Santa Clara County, California. San Francisco.
- "San José (California)" . Encyclopædia Britannica. Vol. 21 (9th ed.). 1886.
- "San Jose". Western and Southern States. Appletons' General Guide to the United States and Canada. New York: D. Appleton & Co. 1889.
- San Jose City Directory. F.M. Husted. 1892.
- Picturesque San José, San Jose: H.S. Foote and C.A. Woolfolk, 1893
- San Jose City Directory. F.M. Husted. 1899.

=== Published in the 20th century ===
- San Jose City Directory. F.M. Husted. 1902.
  - 1907
  - 1911
- Mary Bowden Carroll (1903), Ten years in Paradise, San Jose, Cal: Popp & Hogan, OCLC 2558925, OL 23346957M
- Seeing San Jose and the Santa Clara Valley, San Jose: Guide Publishing Co., 1904
- "San Jose", United States (4th ed.), Leipzig: Karl Baedeker, 1909, OCLC 02338437
- "San José" . Encyclopædia Britannica. Vol. 24 (11th ed.). 1910. p. 150.
- "San Jose", Santa Clara Valley, Woman's Club of Palo Alto, 1911
- Eugene T. Sawyer (1922), History of Santa Clara County, California, Los Angeles: Historic Record Co., OL 13497989M
- William F. James; George H. McMurry (1933), History of San Jose, California, San Jose, Calif: Smith Printing Co.
- Oscar Osburn Winther (1935). "Story of San Jose, 1777–1869, California's First Pueblo". California Historical Society Quarterly. 14 (1): 2–27. doi:10.2307/25160553. JSTOR 25160553.
- Federal Writers' Project (1940), "San Jose", San Francisco: The Bay and Its Cities, American Guide Series, NY: Hastings House
- Peter A. Morrison (1974). "Urban Growth and Decline: San Jose and St. Louis in 1960s". Science. 185 (4153): 757–762. Bibcode:1974Sci...185..757M. doi:10.1126/science.185.4153.757. JSTOR 1738474. PMID 4843376. S2CID 545941.
- Ory Mazar Nergal, ed. (1980), "San Jose, California", Encyclopedia of American Cities, New York: E.P. Dutton, OL 4120668M
- Timothy J. Lukes (1994). "Progressivism Off-Broadway: Reform Politics in San Jose, California, 1880–1920". Southern California Quarterly. 76 (4): 377–400. doi:10.2307/41171743. JSTOR 41171743.
- Ramón D. Chacón (1995). "Quetzalcoatl in San Jose: Conflict over a Commemoration". California History. 74 (3): 328–339. doi:10.2307/25177515. JSTOR 25177515.
- "City & Town Profiles: San Jose", Santa Clara County, 1995, Martinez, California: McCormack's Guides, 1995, p. 166+ (fulltext via Open Library)

=== Published in the 21st century ===
- Johnson, Bob (2010). San Jose. Charleston, South Carolina: Arcadia Publishing. ISBN 978-0-7385-8083-8.
- "San Francisco Bay Area: San Jose", California, Lonely Planet, 2003, OL 8647775M
- "San Jose Mayor Declares State of 'Fiscal Emergency'". The New York Times. May 21, 2011.
- "Cut Salaries, Not Pensions in San Jose, Judge Rules". The New York Times. December 23, 2013.
