= List of tallest buildings in San Jose, California =

Skyline of San Jose
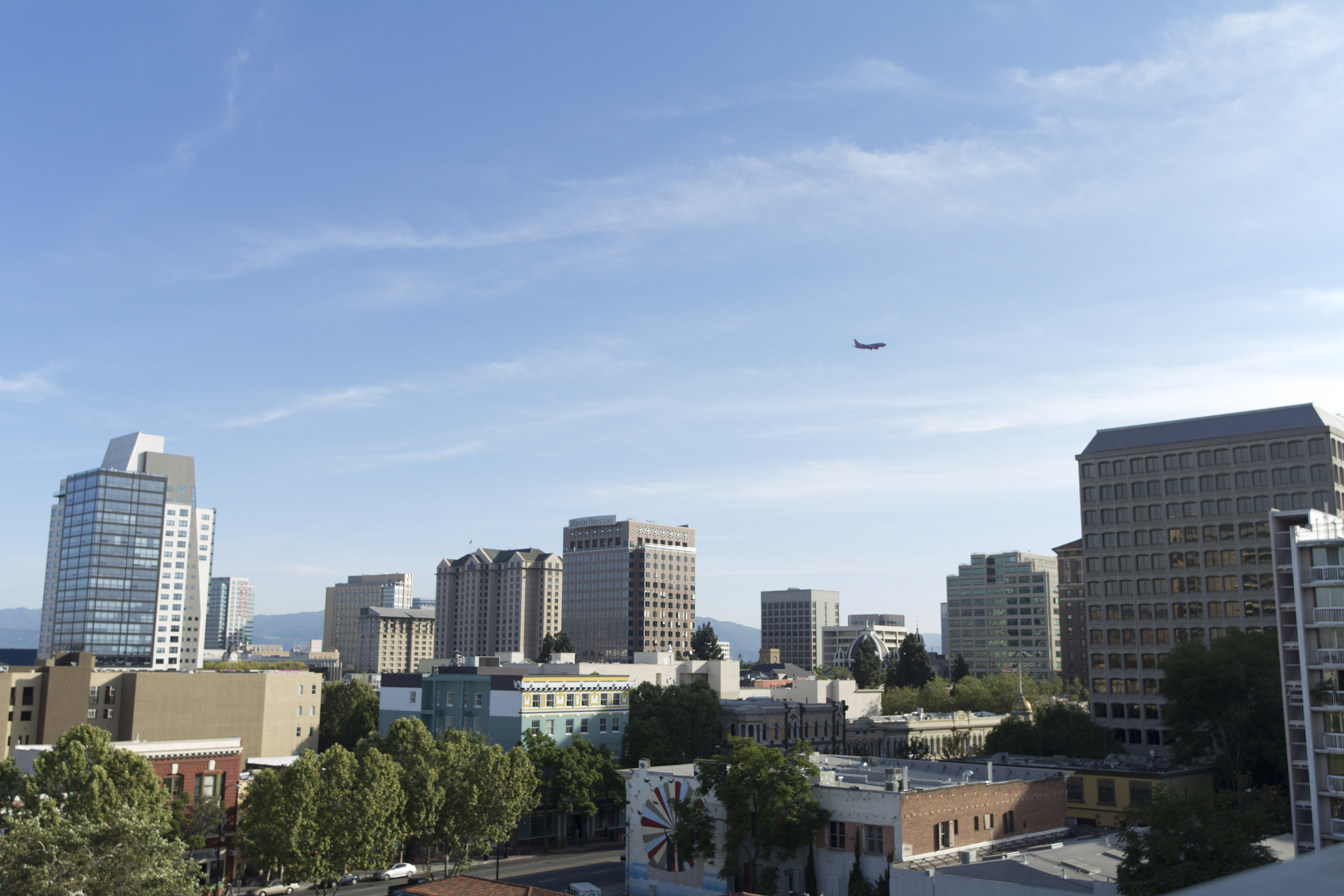
- Downtown San Jose in 2013
- Tallest building: 200 Park Avenue (2023)
- Tallest building height: 300 ft (91.4 m)

Number of tall buildings (2026)
- Taller than 75 m (246 ft): 14

Number of tall buildings — feet
- Taller than 200 ft (61.0 m): 31
- Taller than 300 ft (91.4 m): 1

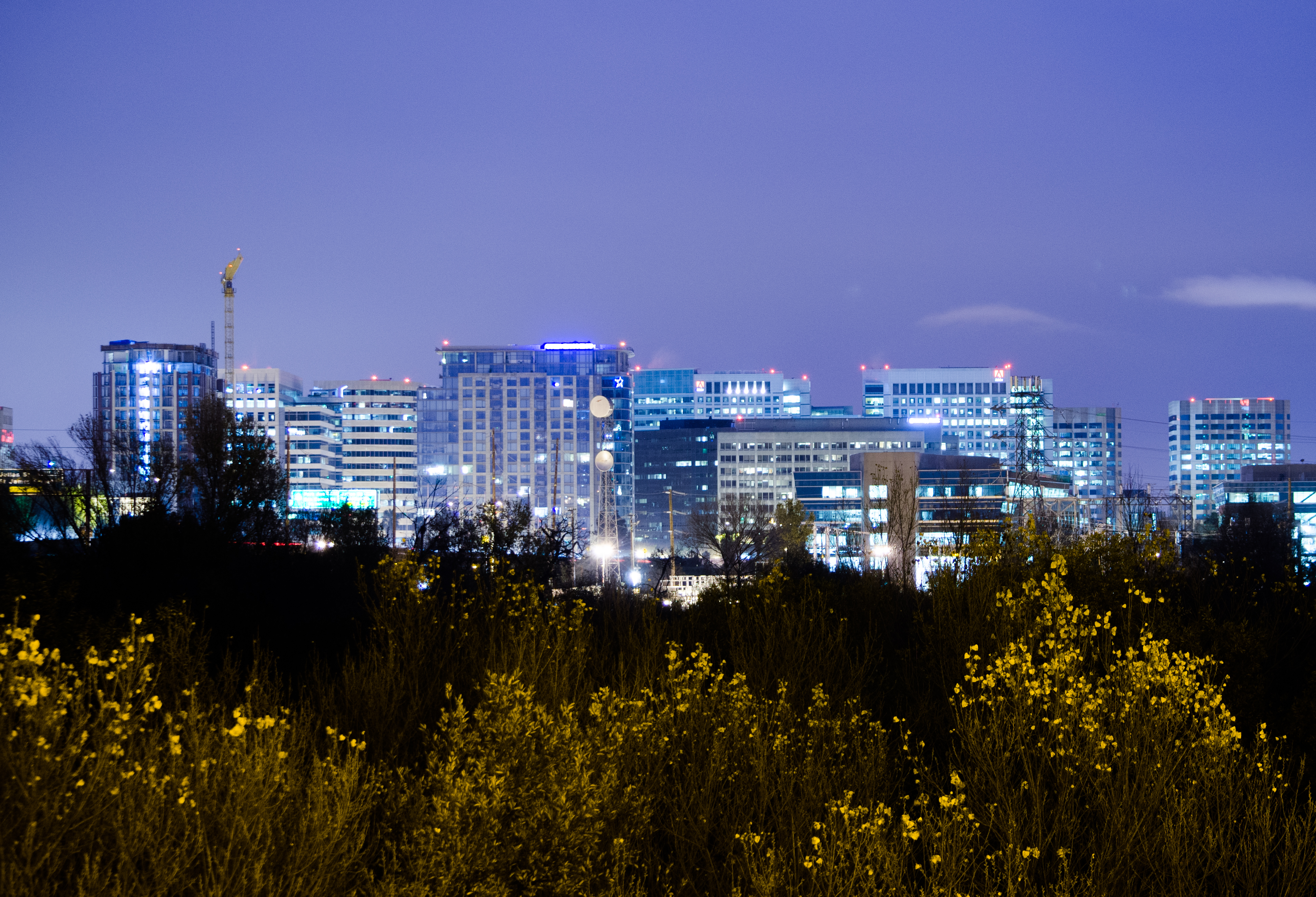
San Jose at night in 2014

San Jose is the most populous city in the San Francisco Bay Area and in Northern California, with a population of approximately 1 million. San Jose is known for having a short skyline. The height of tall buildings in Downtown San Jose is significantly limited due to the proximity of San Jose International Airport. The airport is only 3 miles (4.8 km) northwest of downtown. As a result, of the 31 buildings taller than 200 feet (61 m) in San Jose as of 2026, only the tallest, 200 Park Avenue, reaches a height of 300 feet (91 m). 200 Park Avenue, an office building, was completed in 2023. Prior to its completion, San Jose was the most populous city proper in the U.S. with no buildings over 300 feet. San Jose has the third most high-rises in the Bay Area after San Francisco and Oakland, with over 60 such buildings.

The first high-rises in San Jose arrived in the 1920s. The most notable of these was the Bank of Italy Building, a Renaissance Revival office building built in 1926, which features a decorative cupola with a needle-like spire. At a height of 268 ft (82 m), it was the tallest in the city at the time of its completion. Another early high-rise was the Mission/Spanish Revival style Hotel De Anza. Following a three-decade pause beginning with the Great Depression, high-rise construction resumed in the 1960s.

In the 1980s, new towers began to regularly surpass 200 ft (61 m) in height. Most high-rises built before 2000 were commercial, while the 21st century has seen an increase in the number of residential towers, such as The 88 and Three Sixty Residences in the 2000s. A new city hall opened in 2005, becoming the city's then tallest building with a height of 295 ft (87 m). In 2019, lawmakers approved a height increase of up to 35 ft (11 m) downtown and 150 ft (46 m) in the Diridon Station Area, allowing for the construction of 200 Park Avenue at its eventual height.

San Jose's tallest buildings are concentrated in downtown, which is directly east of California State Route 87 and north of Interstate 280. While the Silicon Valley city is known for its role in the tech industry, many of its corporate headquarters are located in mid-rise campuses. An example of a high-rise corporate headquarters is the Adobe World Headquarters, home to Adobe Inc. Adobe's complex consists of four towers, all reaching over 200 ft (61 m) in height.

== History ==
Number of buildings by height in San Jose by the end of each year, based on the information in this article. Click on the legend to toggle a specific height on or off. View chart definition.

== Map of tallest buildings ==
The map below shows the location of buildings taller than 200 ft (61 m) in San Jose, all of which are in the city's downtown. Each marker is numbered by the building's height rank, and colored by the decade of its completion.

Buildings taller than 200 ft (61 m) in San Jose.
- 1950s and before
- 1960s
- 1970s
- 1980s
- 1990s
- 2000s
- 2010s
- 2020s
1 200 Park Avenue
2 Miro (East Tower)
3 Miro (West Tower)
4 San Jose City Hall
5 Sobrato Office Tower
6 San Jose Marriott
7 Three Sixty Residences
8 Bank of Italy Building
9 The 88
10 Fairmont Plaza
11 Adobe Systems West Tower
12 Signia by Hilton San Jose
13 The Fay
14 Hilton San Jose
15 Adobe Founders Tower
16 One South Market
17 Adobe Systems Almaden Tower
18 Adobe Systems East Tower
19 Ten Almaden
20 RiverPark Towers II
21 188 West St James Tower 1
22 188 West St James Tower 2
23 Axis
24 RiverPark Towers I
25 160 West Santa Clara
26 Tower 55
27 Centerra
28 Opus Center San Jose
29 60 SOMA
30 Heritage Bank Building
31 The Grad San Jose

== Cityscape ==
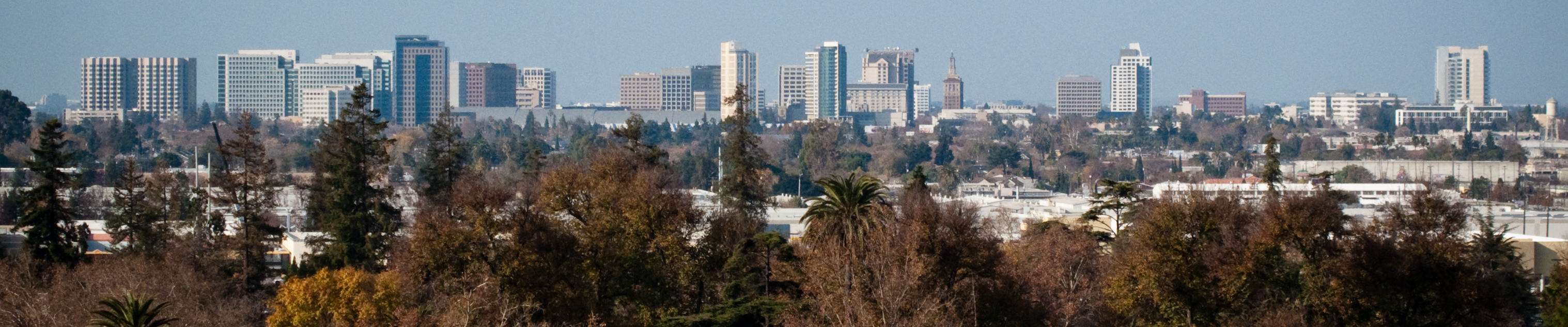
Downtown San Jose from Oak Hill in 2009

== Tallest buildings ==
This list ranks completed buildings in San Jose that stand at least 200 ft (61 m) tall as of 2026, based on standard height measurement. This includes spires and architectural details but does not include antenna masts. The “Year” column indicates the year of completion. Buildings tied in height are sorted by year of completion with earlier buildings ranked first, and then alphabetically.

Was the tallest building in San Jose upon completion

| Rank | Name | Image | Location | Height ft (m) | Floors | Year | Purpose | Notes |
|---|---|---|---|---|---|---|---|---|
| 1 | 200 Park Avenue | | 200 Park Avenue 37°19′51″N 121°53′30″W | 300 (91.4) | 19 | 2023 | Office | Tallest building in San Jose since 2023. Tallest building completed in San Jose in the 2020s. |
| 2 | Miro (East Tower) | | 181 E Santa Clara Street 37°20′18″N 121°53′13″W | 298 (90.8) | 28 | 2021 | Residential | Part of a two-tower residential complex with street-level retail. Topped out as of July 21, 2020. Joint-tallest building in San Jose from 2021 to 2023. |
| 3 | Miro (West Tower) | | 181 E Santa Clara Street 37°20′18″N 121°53′15″W | 298 (90.8) | 28 | 2021 | Residential | Part of a two-tower residential complex with street-level retail. Topped out as of July 21, 2020. Joint-tallest building in San Jose from 2021 to 2023. |
| 4 | San Jose City Hall | | 200 East Santa Clara Street 37°20′17″N 121°53′07″W | 285 (86.9) | 18 | 2005 | Office | Seat of the city government. Tallest building in San Jose from 2005 to 2021. Tallest building completed in San Jose in the 2000s. |
| 5 | Sobrato Office Tower | | 488 South Almaden Boulevard 37°19′38″N 121°53′21″W | 280 (85.3) | 17 | 2002 | Office | Tallest building in San Jose from 2002 to 2005. |
| 6 | San Jose Marriott | | 301 South Market Street 37°19′49″N 121°53′18″W | 269 (82) | 27 | 2003 | Hotel | Tallest hotel building in San Jose. |
| 7 | Three Sixty Residences | | 360 South Market Street 37°19′48″N 121°53′13″W | 269 (82) | 23 | 2009 | Residential | |
| 8 | Bank of Italy Building | | 30 South 1st Street 37°20′09″N 121°53′25″W | 268 (81.8) | 14 | 1926 | Office | Tallest building in San Jose from 1926 to 2002. Tallest building completed in San Jose in the 1920s. Westbank, who purchased the building in 2025, announced plans to convert the building into residential use. |
| 9 | The 88 | | 88 East San Fernando Street 37°20′06″N 121°53′14″W | 268 (81.7) | 22 | 2008 | Residential | |
| 10 | Fairmont Plaza | | 50 West San Fernando Street 37°20′02″N 121°53′21″W | 261 (79.6) | 17 | 1988 | Office | Tallest building completed in San Jose in the 1980s. |
| 11 | Adobe Systems West Tower | | 345 Park Avenue 37°19′51″N 121°53′40″W | 259 (78.9) | 18 | 1996 | Office | Part of Adobe World Headquarters. Also known as Adobe Systems I. Tallest building completed in San Jose in the 1990s. |
| 12 | Signia by Hilton San Jose | | 170 South Market Street 37°19′59″N 121°53′20″W | 252 (76.8) | 22 | 1987 | Hotel | Formerly the Fairmont Hotel. Reopened as a Hilton in 2022. |
| 13 | The Fay | | 600 South First Street 37°19′37″N 121°53′00″W | 252 (76.8) | 23 | 2024 | Residential | |
| 14 | Hilton San Jose | | 300 South Almaden Boulevard 37°19′45″N 121°53′26″W | 246 (75) | 18 | 1992 | Hotel | |
| 15 | Adobe Founders Tower | | 333 West San Fernando Street 37°19′55″N 121°53′44″W | 245 (74.7) | 18 | 2022 | Office | Also known as Adobe North Tower. Adobe's fourth tower just north of their original campus. Connected by an elevated bridge. Topped out in 2021. |
| 16 | One South Market | | 1 South Market Street 37°20′06″N 121°53′32″W | 238 (72.5) | 23 | 2015 | Residential | Tallest building completed in San Jose in the 2010s. |
| 17 | Adobe Systems Almaden Tower | | 151 Almaden Boulevard 37°19′53″N 121°53′37″W | 236 (72) | 18 | 2003 | Office | Part of Adobe World Headquarters. |
| 18 | Adobe Systems East Tower | | 321 Park Avenue 37°19′51″N 121°53′36″W | 236 (71.9) | 16 | 1998 | Office | Part of Adobe World Headquarters. Also known as Adobe Systems II. |
| 19 | Ten Almaden | | 10 South Almaden Boulevard 37°20′02″N 121°53′39″W | 230 (70) | 16 | 1988 | Office | |
| 20 | RiverPark Towers II | | 333 West San Carlos Street 37°19′45″N 121°53′41″W | 230 (70) (Note: Sources do not state the exact height of this building. This figure was determined using Google Earth by subtracting the altitude of the building's lowest main pedestrian open-air entrance from its highest architectural point.) | 17 | 2009 | Office | |
| 21 | 188 West St James Tower 1 | | 188 West St James 37°20′15″N 121°53′42″W | 228 (69.5) | 24 | 2021 | Residential | The eastern building of the 188 West St James residential complex. |
| 22 | 188 West St James Tower 2 | | 188 West St James 37°20′14″N 121°53′44″W | 228 (69.5) | 24 | 2021 | Residential | The western building of the 188 West St James residential complex. |
| 23 | Axis | | 38 North Almaden Boulevard 37°20′05″N 121°53′45″W | 226 (69) | 22 | 2008 | Residential | |
| 24 | RiverPark Towers I | | 333 West San Carlos Street 37°19′44″N 121°53′37″W | 224 (68) | 17 | 1987 | Office | |
| 25 | 160 West Santa Clara | | 160 West Santa Clara Street 37°20′05″N 121°53′35″W | 220 (67) | 17 | 1988 | Office | |
| 26 | Tower 55 | | 55 South Market Street 37°20′03″N 121°53′30″W | 217 (66) | 15 | 1984 | Office | Formerly known as Market Post Tower; also known as the Gold Building or simply 55 South Market. |
| 27 | Centerra | | 70 Notre Dame Avenue 37°20′10″N 121°53′43″W | 217 (66) | 21 | 2015 | Residential | |
| 28 | Opus Center San Jose | | 225 West Santa Clara Street 37°20′05″N 121°53′40″W | 211 (64) | 16 | 2001 | Office | |
| 29 | 60 SOMA | | 60 South Market Street 37°20′04″N 121°53′27″W | 212 (64.6) | 15 | 1986 | Office | |
| 30 | Heritage Bank Building | | 150 Almaden Boulevard 37°19′55″N 121°53′33″W | 209 (63.7) | 15 | 1985 | Office | Also known as The Offices at CityView. The building is planned to be demolished as part of phase 3 of new City View Complex. |
| 31 | The Grad San Jose | | 88 East San Carlos Street 37°19′56″N 121°53′06″W | 202 (61.6) | 19 | 2020 | Residential | |

== Tallest under construction or approved ==
=== Under construction ===
As of 2026, there are no buildings planned to be taller than 200 ft (61 m) that are under construction in San Jose. The most recent building constructed taller than that height is The Fay, which was completed in 2024.

=== Proposed ===
As of 2026, there are no approved or proposed buildings planned to be taller than 200 ft (61 m) in San Jose.

== Timeline of tallest buildings ==
| Name | Image | Years as tallest | Height ft (m) | Floors | Notes |
|---|---|---|---|---|---|
| Bank of Italy Building | | 1926–2002 | 268 (81.8) | 14 | |
| Sobrato Office Tower | | 2002–2005 | 280 (85.3) | 17 | |
| San Jose City Hall | | 2005–2021 | 285 (86.9) | 18 | |
| Miro (East Tower) | | 2021–2023 | 298 (90.8) | 28 | |
| Miro (West Tower) | | 2021–2023 | 298 (90.8) | 28 | |
| 200 Park Avenue | | 2023–present | 300 (91.4) | 19 | |

== See also ==
- List of tallest buildings in California
- List of tallest buildings in Oakland
- List of tallest buildings in San Francisco
