= First Presbyterian Church of San Jose =

Coordinates: 37.33855°N 121.88841°W

The First Presbyterian Church of San Jose was a Presbyterian church in San Jose, California, United States. Founded in 1849, it was one of the oldest Protestant churches in California.

The First Presbyterian building is located on 49 N. 4th Street in Downtown San Jose across from San Jose City Hall. The neighborhood is home to several other churches, including the Trinity Episcopal Cathedral, the First Unitarian Church of San Jose, Our Lady of La Vang Parish, and the Cathedral Basilica of St. Joseph.

== History ==
On February 23, 1849, the Rev. John W. Douglas, a young Presbyterian minister, arrived at Monterey Bay, California via steamship. In March 1849, he began his ministry in San Jose, California. The church, which was called "Independent Presbyterian Church," first met in the "Juzgado," a building which at the time also served as both a courthouse and as a jail (see San Jose City Hall).

In 1851, a wooden church was built on North Second Street, across the street from the present Trinity Episcopal Cathedral.

On June 3, 1858, the church changed its name to "First Presbyterian Church," and has been called that ever since.

In just over a decade, the original wooden building was considered to be too small. A new brick church building was built in 1863. This building was repaired after the earthquake of 1868, and was in use until the 1906 San Francisco earthquake demolished that church building.

A new church building, located at 48 N. 3rd Street, was completed and dedicated in April 1908. That building was in use for several decades, until 1968, when it was condemned as a fire hazard.

A new and smaller church building was built on 49 N. 4th Street, and has been in use since 1973.

On June 30, 2019, the First Presbyterian Church of San Jose held its last Sunday service, which was attended by members, friends and guest musicians. The congregation voted to dissolve, due to declining membership. The programs that benefit people who are homeless will continue for now.

== Daughter churches ==
Over the years, the First Presbyterian Church of San Jose has given birth to many other Presbyterian churches. In 1881, 77 members were dismissed to organize the Second Presbyterian Church, now known as the Westminster Presbyterian Church.

In 1944, a committee of elders laid the foundations of the Foothill Presbyterian Church.

In 1953, about 250 members of the First Church became the founding members of the Calvin Presbyterian Church which closed in 2007.

The First Presbyterian Church of San Jose was part of the Presbytery of San Jose, the Synod of the Pacific, and the Presbyterian Church (U.S.A.).
