= Waterscape =

A waterscape is an aquatic landscape. Waterscape may also refer to:

- Waterscape, a website maintained by British Waterways from 2003 to 2012
- "Waterscape", a 2005 art installation by Anna Valentina Murch at San Jose City Hall
