= San Jose City Hall =

Seat of the municipal government of San Jose, California

San José City Hall
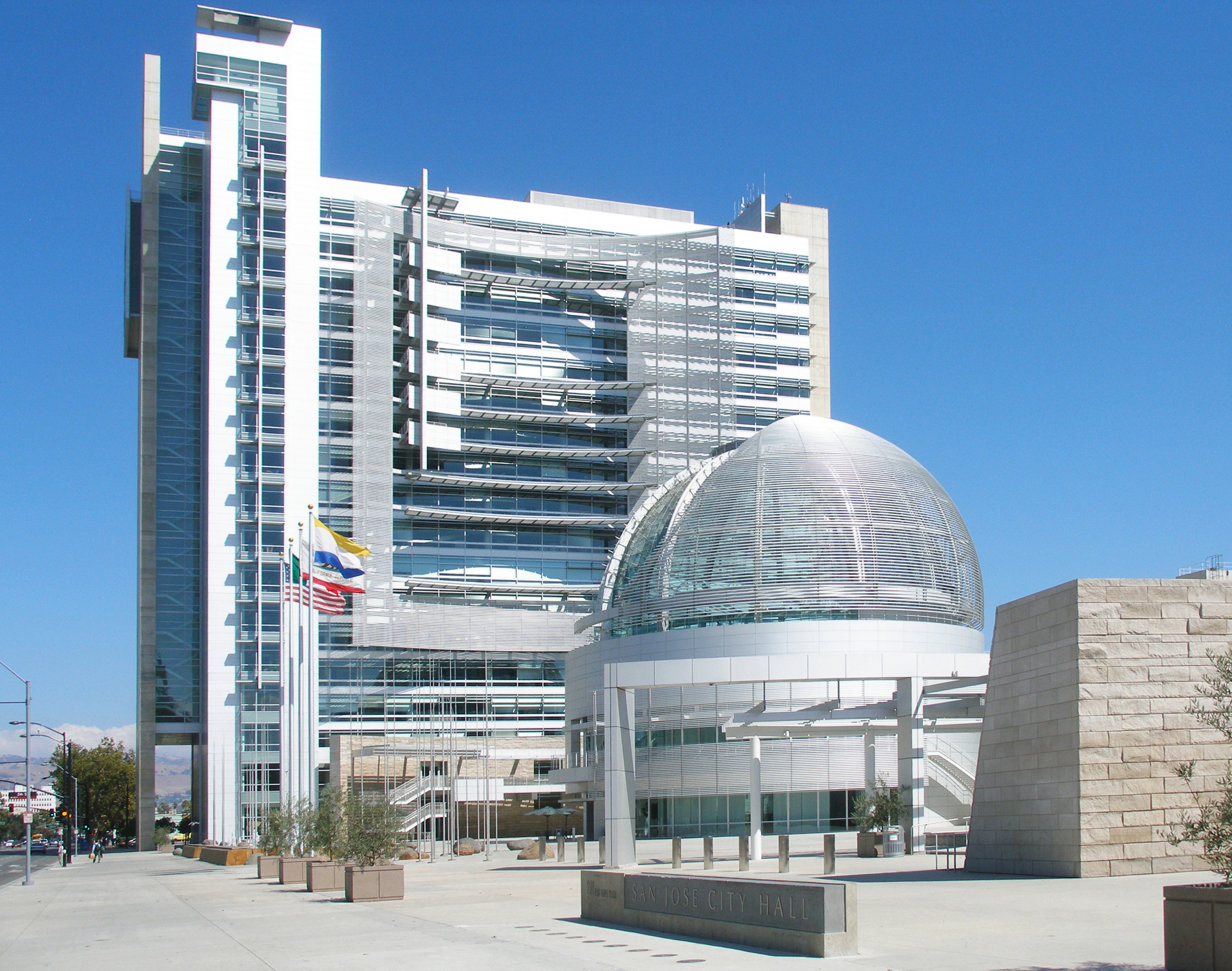
- Interactive map of the San José City Hall area

General information
- Status: Completed
- Type: Government offices
- Architectural style: Postmodern
- Location: 200 East Santa Clara Street, San Jose, California, United States
- Coordinates: 37.3378°N 121.8861°W
- Current tenants: City of San José; U.S. Patent & Trademark Office
- Groundbreaking: 2002; 24 years ago
- Opened: October 15, 2005; 20 years ago
- Cost: $384 million

Height
- Roof: 86.9 m (285 ft)

Technical details
- Floor count: 18; 2 below ground
- Floor area: 49,240 m^{2} (530,000 sq ft)
- Lifts/elevators: 11

Design and construction
- Architects: Richard Meier & Partners Architect; Steinberg Architects
- Engineer: Englekirk & Sabol
- Main contractor: Devcon Construction; Turner Construction

San José City Hall is the seat of the municipal government of San Jose, California. Located in Downtown San Jose, it was designed by Pritzker Prize-winning architect Richard Meier in a Postmodern style. It consists of an 18-story tower, an iconic glass rotunda, and a city council chamber wing, laid out within a two-block-long public square known as San José Civic Plaza. The tower rises 285 feet (87 m) above the plaza, making it the fourth tallest building in San Jose.

San Jose has had six seats of government in its history. City officials met in Downtown San Jose from before the city's incorporation in 1850 until the 1950s, when a modern City Hall was built at Civic Center to the north. The current City Hall's construction capped a period of rapid growth for the city during the dot-com bubble. Its opening in 2005 marked the municipal government's return downtown after half a century in an office park setting.

== Architecture ==
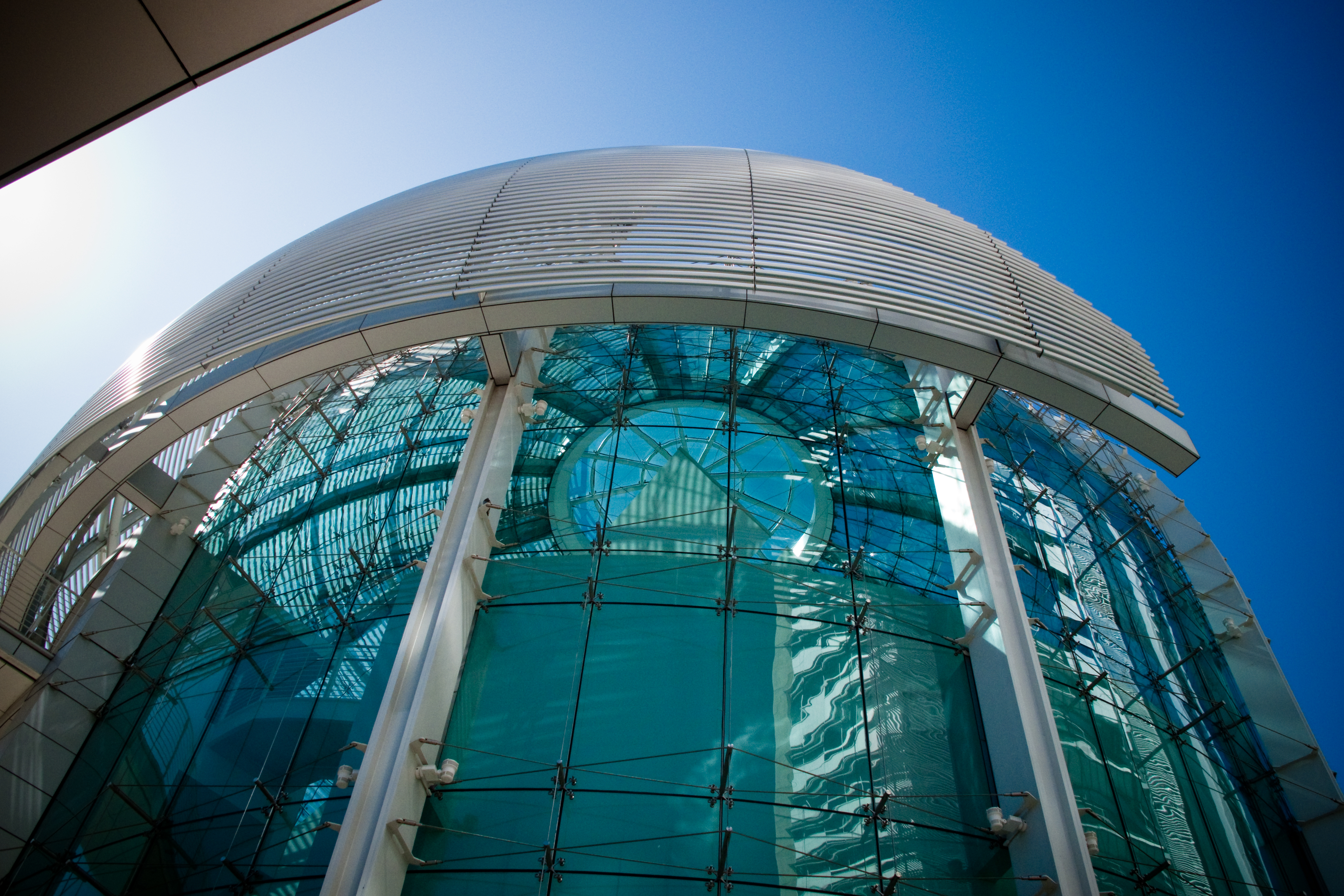
A closeup of the rotunda

City Hall was designed by Richard Meier, who also designed the Getty Center in Los Angeles, the Barcelona Museum of Contemporary Art in Barcelona, The Hague City Hall, and numerous other buildings around the world. San Jose–based Steinberg Architects was the associate architect. Meier's Postmodern design is most influenced by that of Le Corbusier and contrasts with the Beaux-Arts city halls in San Francisco and Oakland.

City Hall consists of three wings totaling 530,000 square feet (49,000 m^{2}) within a 32-acre (13 ha) Civic Plaza complex:

- An 18-story secretariat tower houses various city offices. At 285 feet (87 m), it was the tallest building in San Jose until Tower 88 surpassed it by 1 foot (0.30 m) in 2008. The tower has a thin footprint of 68 by 255 feet (21 m × 78 m). The mayor's office is located on the top floor of the tower.
- The freestanding Janet Gray Hayes Rotunda rises 110 feet (34 m) above the center of the plaza, resembling a planetarium. It has a diameter of 100 feet (30 m), slightly wider than the United States Capitol rotunda. The entire exterior is a glass curtain wall, supported by tension cables and structural steel beams. Mayor Ron Gonzales and other city officials insisted on a rotunda to evoke classical civic buildings. It was originally conceived as a public entrance to symbolize open government. However, by 2015, the 9,427 square feet (875.8 m^{2}) space had become a ceremonial entrance, usually closed off to the public but rented out for city and private events about 150 times a year.
- The three-story west wing or council wing contains the San Jose City Council chamber, public meeting rooms, and the western field office of the United States Patent and Trademark Office. The 7,000-square-foot (650 m^{2}) council chamber seats 330. Unlike the previous city hall's council chamber, which featured a raised dais, the current chamber is shaped like a lecture hall, with audience seating rising above the dais. A grand staircase leads to the chambers and an elevated walkway that connects the west wing with the rotunda and tower. Like the rotunda, the grand staircase is no longer a public entrance; instead, the public enters from beneath the staircase, and an elevator provides access to the council chambers.

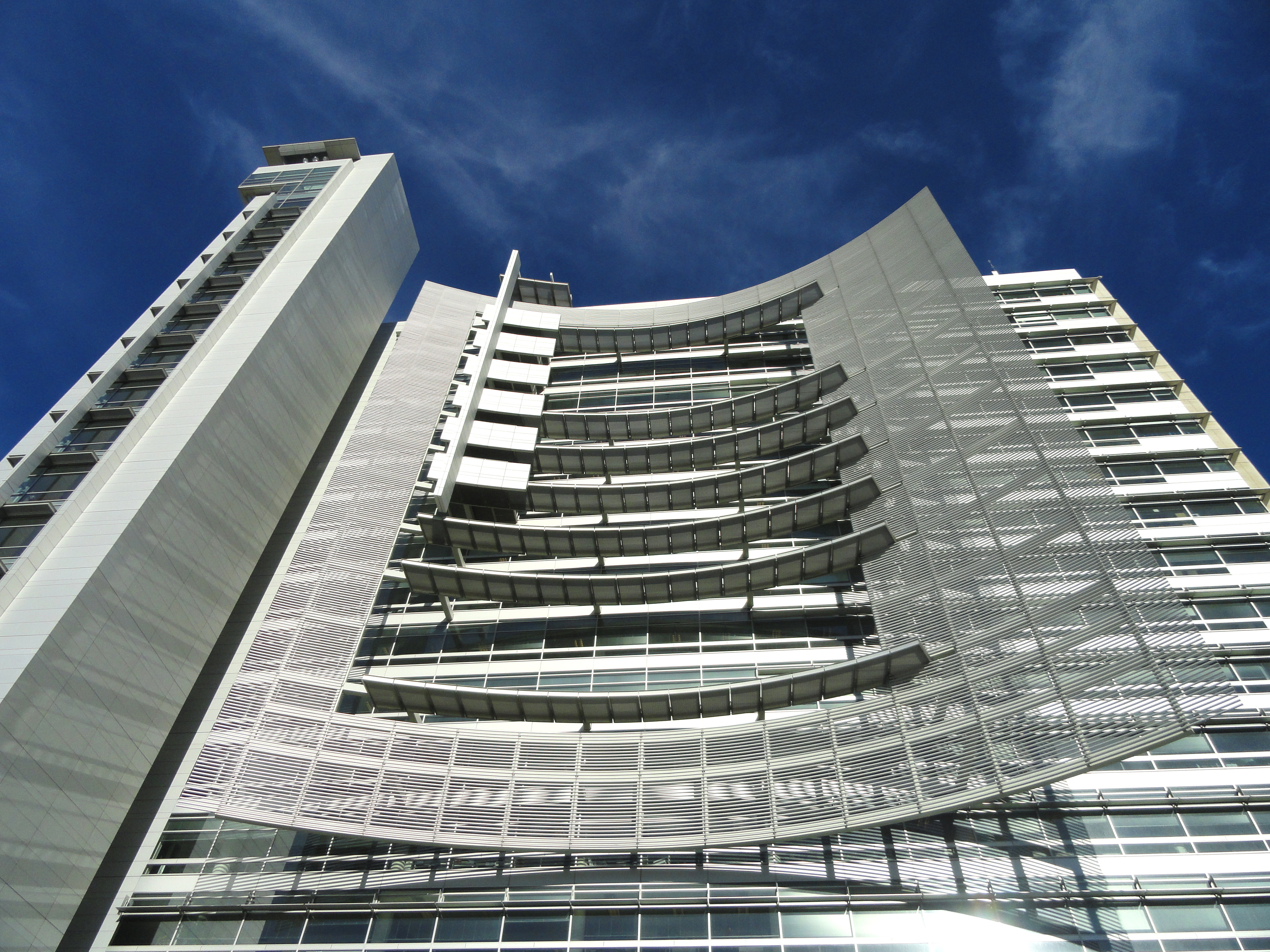
The brise soleil on the tower's western façade

City Hall's tall, thin tower is designed to withstand significant shaking from nearby faults, which include the Silver Creek, Calaveras, Hayward, and San Andreas faults. The building is stabilized by full-height, concrete shear walls on the north and south sides of the building, which are likened to bookends. They are connected to a steel moment-resisting frame across the west and east sides.

== History ==
The current city hall is San Jose's sixth government headquarters building, reflecting San Jose's rise from a small farming town to one of the largest cities in the country.

=== Early seats of government ===
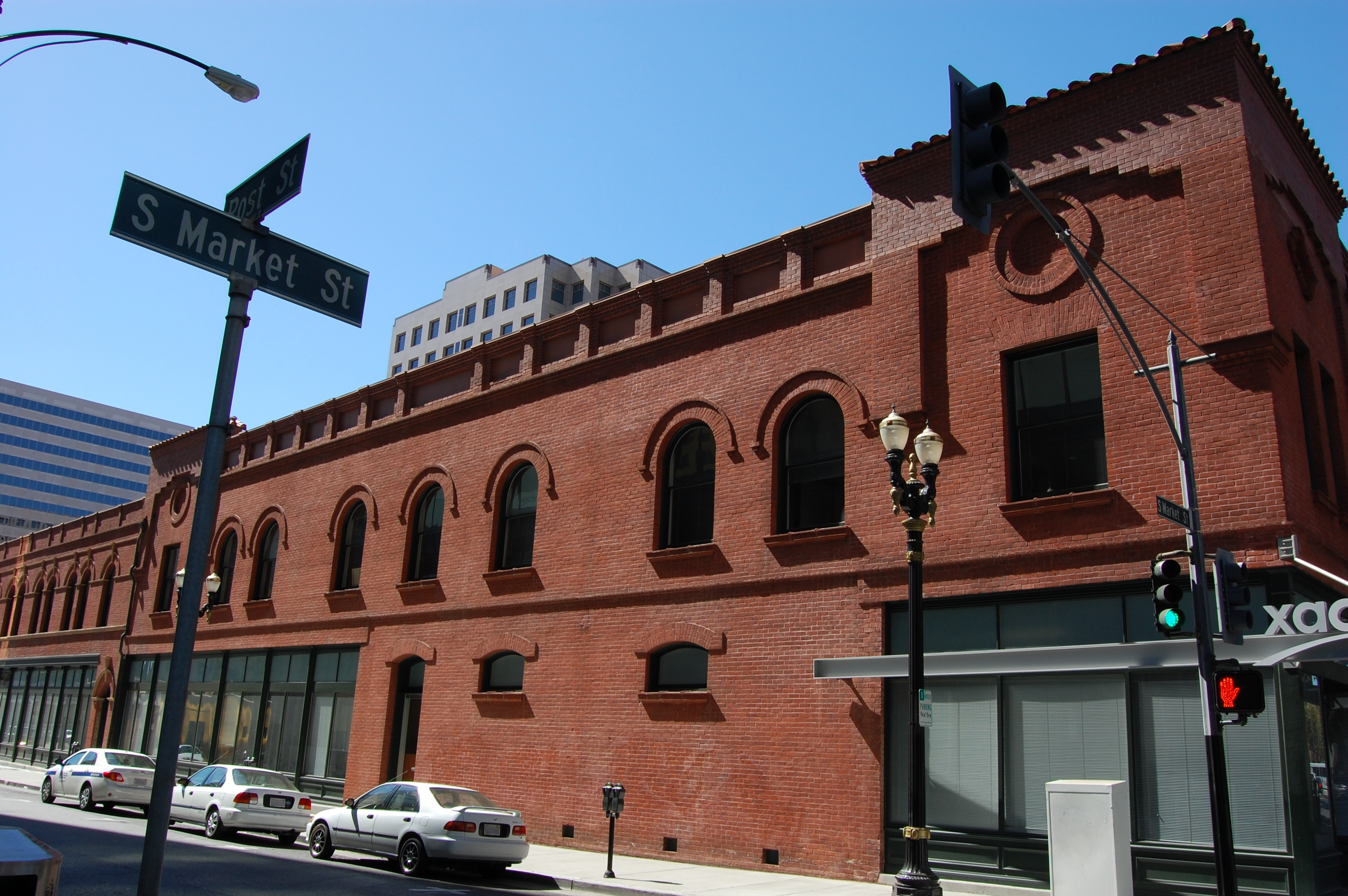
The Alcantara Building that was built on the site of the 1797 juzgado

The City of San José's predecessor, el Pueblo de San José de Guadalupe, was headquartered at a juzgado, a single-story adobe structure built in 1785 near the Río de Guadalupe. Similar to a rural American courthouse, it served as the main administrative building, with an assembly, court, and jail, and offices for the comisionado and alcalde. Today, the pueblo's original site is marked by a California Historical Landmark marker, part of the Juan Bautista de Anza National Historic Trail, in the Civic Center complex north of downtown.

Around 1797, the pobladores (settlers) of San José moved south to higher ground to avoid flooding from the river. A new juzgado was built the next year in the middle of the present-day intersection of South Market and Post streets. San José had by this time become the political center of Alta California del Norte. On July 14, 1846, during the Mexican–American War, Captain Thomas Fallon's men took over the juzgado and raised the American flag over San José for the first time at this location. The event is now commemorated by a statue in Pellier Park. In early 1847, the pueblo's first American school held classes at the juzgado in full view of prisoners.

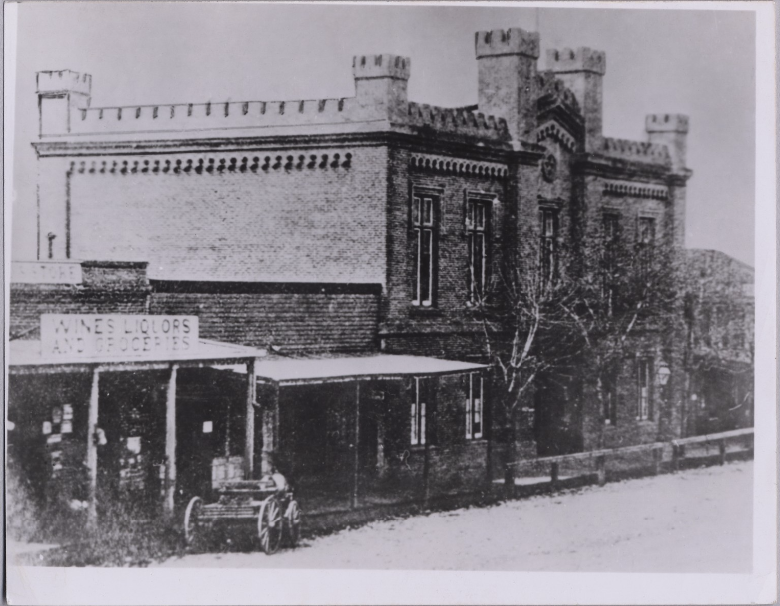
San Jose City Hall in 1854

San Jose was incorporated as one of California's first cities on March 27, 1850. Mayor Josiah Belden convened the city council for the first time on April 13 at the juzgado, a short distance from the plaza mayor where the first California State Legislature was in session. The juzgado was sold and torn down that July. For the next few years, the city government operated out of rented buildings, including the former state capitol in the plaza. Some of the juzgado's adobe walls may have been incorporated into the Alcantara Building that now stands at the site. Additionally, some of the bricks were used in the construction of San Jose's first post office, now part of the San Jose Museum of Art.

On August 14, 1854, a city committee called for proposals to build a permanent city hall. On October 16, voters approved a $20,000 budget for the new building (equivalent to $546,754 in 2024). The city purchased a site on North Market Street. Levi Goodrich designed the two-story building, which measured 55 by 40 feet (17 m × 12 m). The Common Council (as the city council was then called) met there for the first time on April 16, 1855. Originally, the building had a Gothic façade and parapet. Around 1870, it was rebuilt with a Greek exterior. The Santa Clara County superior court rented the second floor from September 1, 1860, until a new courthouse was built at St. James Square. The building was destroyed in the 1906 San Francisco earthquake. The San José Fire Department's Torrent Engine Company #2 was stationed at San Jose City Hall from 1869 to 1951, when the San Jose Central Fire Station opened.

=== Market Plaza city hall ===
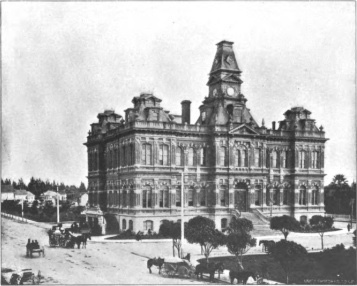
San Jose City Hall around 1896

After the Chinatown at Market Plaza burnt to the ground in 1887, voters approved a new city hall building to be built in the center of the plaza. W. J. Wolcott oversaw construction of the building, which cost $139,482 (equivalent to $4.4 million in 2024). At the height of anti-Chinese sentiment, the city council prohibited the use of Chinese labor, even though the building was located across from the Market Street Chinatown. The city hall was dedicated by Mayor Samuel Boring on April 17, 1889.

The brick and terracotta building was designed by San Jose–based, self-taught architect Theodore Lenzen based on German, Italianate, and Victorian designs with French Empire detailing. The American Institute of Architects has been critical of the design, which has been called "bastard baroque" and likened to a "gingerbread house". The San José Public Library was located on the second floor. The city jail, with a drive-through entrance and drunk tank, occupied the basement.

The building was heavily damaged in the 1906 San Francisco earthquake.

In 1931, the city commissioned the urban planner Harland Bartholomew to design a City Beautiful civic center within St. James Park modeled on Daniel Burnham's Civic Center in San Francisco. Bartholomew presented his plan on August 6, 1931, calling for new city and county administration buildings, a post office, museums, and a civic auditorium. However, the city failed to raise the necessary funds, while the county, post office, and library opted for their own plans. St. James Park became infamous internationally for the 1933 lynching of two men accused of kidnapping and murdering Brooke Hart. Bartholomew's plans for the park were scrapped, as were subsequent civic center plans in the 1940s and 1950s.

=== Civic Center city hall ===
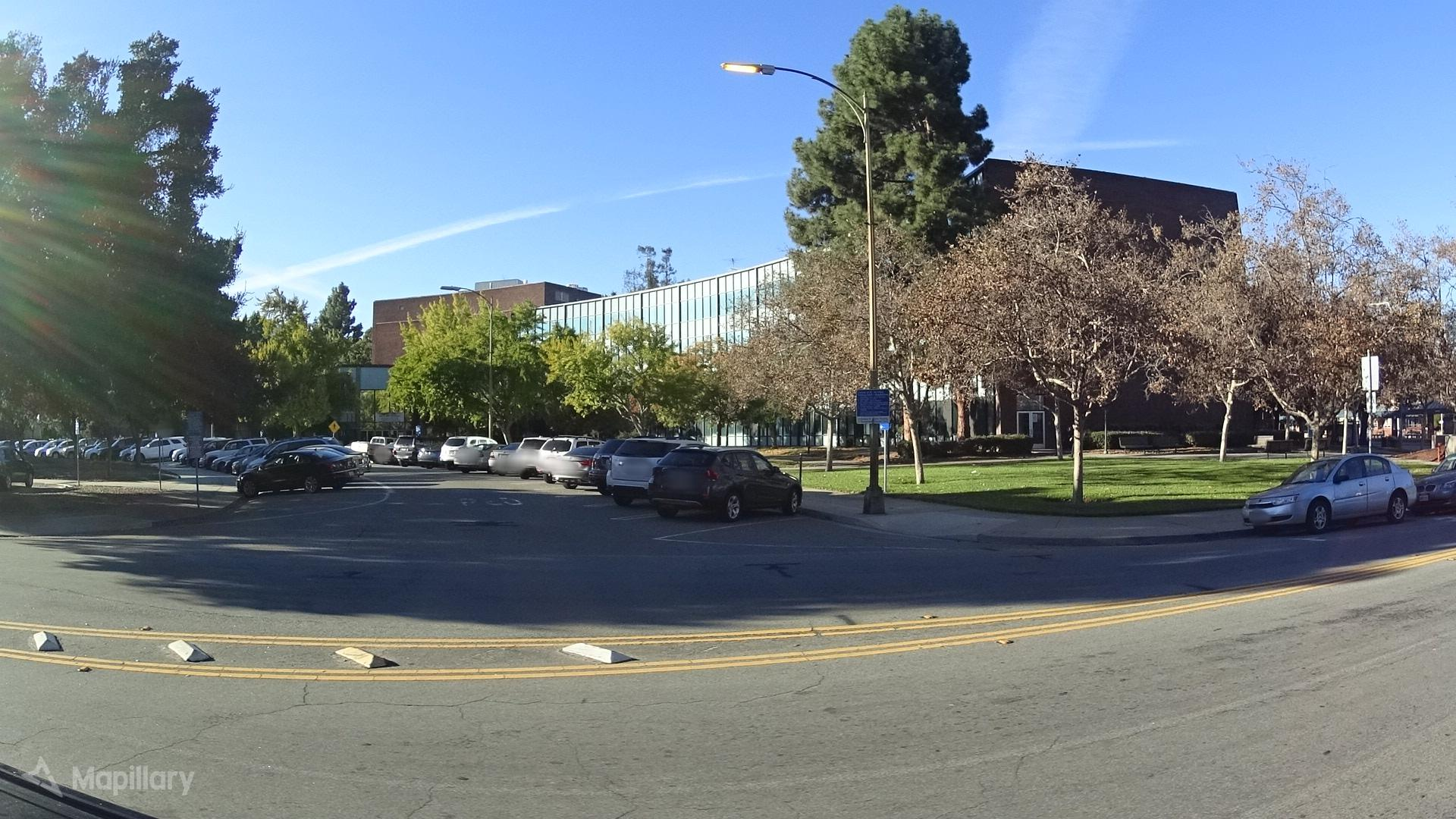
The former City Hall at Civic Center pictured in 2016, after its sale to Santa Clara County

During the postwar construction boom, City Manager Dutch Hamann and the business community, led by the San Jose Mercury and News, attempted four times to convince voters to approve a new city hall that would improve San Jose's image as a major city, finally succeeding in 1952. The new city hall would sit on 10.1 acres (4.1 ha) of donated land about one-half mile (0.80 km) north of the downtown area. It would be colocated with federal, state, and county facilities at the Civic Center at North First and Mission streets, near the site of the original pueblo. A $1.98 million bond measure (equivalent to $18 million in 2024) was approved in 1955 to finance the new building. Donald Francis Haines designed a curved, four-story-tall building with influences from Modern architecture and the International Style. It was one of thousands of Modern buildings built in the city between 1950 and 1970.

Construction began in 1956. As the city outgrew the old building, the San Jose Police Department moved into temporary offices. The new 106,000-square-foot (9,800 m^{2}), 400-foot-long (120 m) building was dedicated on March 27, 1958. The building was built by Carl N. Swenson Company at a cost of just over $2.6 million ($21.6 million in 2024). It was one of the first curtain wall buildings erected on the West Coast during the Modern period.

Moving thousands of city employees out of the downtown area exacerbated the urban decay that resulted in part from Hamann's aggressive program of suburban development. Beginning in 1956, city leaders attempted to revitalize the urban core by clearing older buildings for redevelopment. Despite pleas by historian Clyde Arbuckle, the previous city hall in Plaza Park was demolished in June 1958, a move now widely regretted by city officials. The building's cornerstone was placed in the ground about 50 yards (46 m) from its original location. Though the park remained in the center of Market Street, the surrounding blocks downtown largely sat vacant for decades.

Over the next few decades, the city and Santa Clara County continued developing the Civic Center complex. In 1961, the county opened a seven-story Government Center building adjacent to City Hall, followed by a ten-story, rust-colored east wing in 1974 and the county's Main Jail in 1989. A six-story, 7,000-square-foot (650 m^{2}) annex, designed by Norman "Bud" Curtis, was added to the City Hall building in the 1970s. The overall 113,000-square-foot (10,500 m^{2}) building housed 1,100 city employees.

In 1987, the Civic Center light rail station opened on North First Street adjacent to City Hall, providing rail access to the downtown area.

The building is now considered seismically unsound, and it is contaminated by asbestos. Renovating it would cost $46 million.

=== Current city hall ===
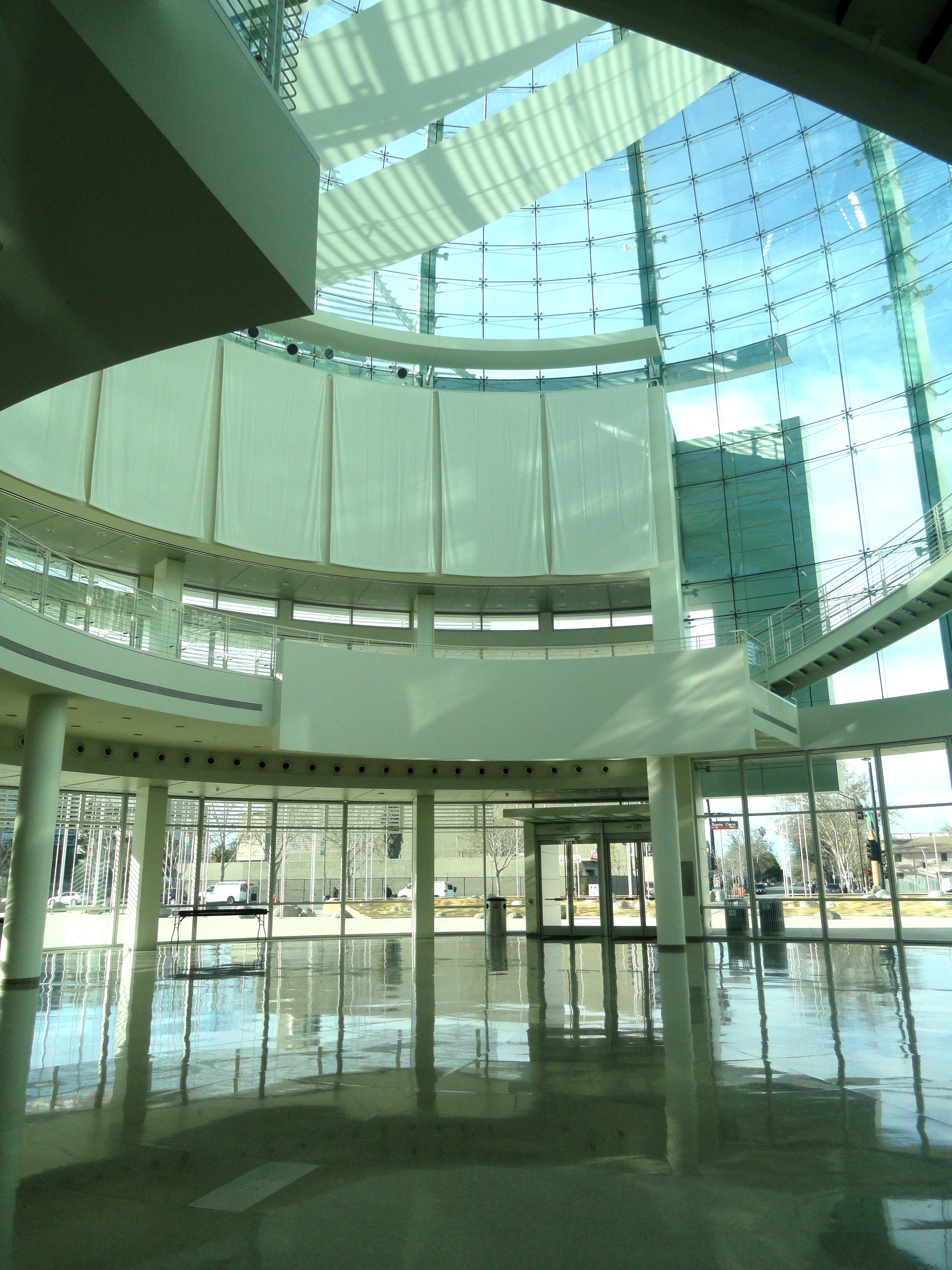
The interior of the rotunda

In the 1990s, taking advantage of growth from the dot-com boom, the city began planning a return downtown. A new city hall would bolster the urban renewal program that had finally begun turning the vast expanse of downtown parking lots into a retail and entertainment district. It would also consolidate city offices. The city had been spending about $6 million annually to lease office space downtown, but City Hall's location at Civic Center had become a major inconvenience. City employees had to drive several miles between meetings, and the City Hall parking lot on Mission Street could only accommodate senior staff.

On November 5, 1996, voters passed Measure I by more than 60% to authorize the relocation. In August 1998, an urban design study by Sasaki Associates recommended a site along East Santa Clara Street near San Jose State University, with the intention of expanding the downtown core eastward. Later that year, Richard Meier was selected as the new building's architect. Initially, he suggested incorporating a venue for the San Jose Symphony to keep the complex vibrant during weekends. In 1999, Mayor Ron Gonzales and the city council rejected all of Meier's first round of proposals, which called for a low-rise office block, and insisted on a more iconic structure that featured a rotunda.

Construction was originally estimated to cost $178 million, and a 1998 budget allocated $214 million to the project (equivalent to $383 million in 2024). However, former mayor Albert J. Ruffo successfully sued the city to stop it from using San Jose Redevelopment Agency funds for the project. A 2002 suit also tried unsuccessfully to keep the city from demolishing the 1894 Fox-Markovits Building to make way for one of the two planned parking garages. The resulting delays in land acquisition, combined with design changes required by city officials, caused the price to jump to $343 million by 2002 ($570 million in 2024), even as the city faced a budget shortfall of over $30 million after the collapse of the dot-com bubble. The cost overrun prompted the city council to explore leasing the Sobrato Office Tower, which was under construction and awaiting a tenant. Nevertheless, the project broke ground later that year.

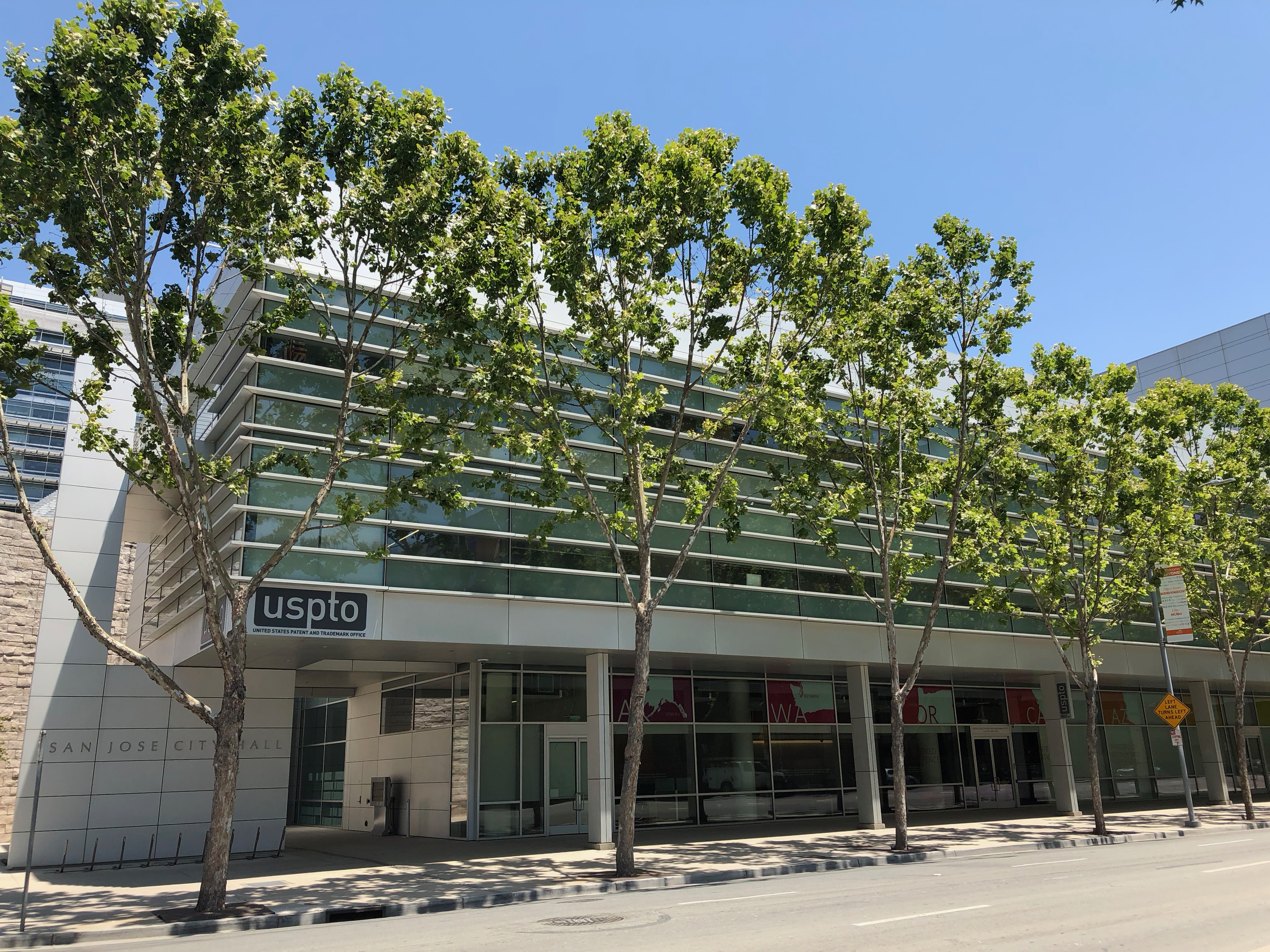
USPTO satellite office

Employees began moving into the new City Hall in August 2005, two years later than originally planned. The building officially opened on October 15, 2005. The project ultimately cost $384 million ($591 million in 2024), possibly more than any other city hall in the country, with the rotunda alone costing $40 million ($61.6 million in 2024). Due in part to controversies over its construction cost, the building was initially exempted from City Council's 2001 policy of requiring all municipal buildings larger than 10,000 square feet (930 m^{2}) to receive LEED Silver or higher certification. It eventually received LEED Platinum for Existing Buildings certification in March 2009, becoming the first city hall in the country to receive this certification.

In 2011, the city sold the former Civic Center city hall to Santa Clara County for $10 million to settle a $62.9 million county lawsuit against the city for unpaid bills.

Starbucks planned to open a café at the complex but pulled out in 2014 amid debate over whether the city should enforce living wage rules at the location. In 2015, the United States Patent and Trademark Office opened a 35,194-square-foot (3,269.6 m^{2}) Silicon Valley satellite office in a part of the west wing building of City Hall that had previously been occupied by the Human Resources Department (who were relocated to the main Tower building). The office includes patent examiners and Patent Trial and Appeal Board judges.

On November 19, 2024, the rotunda was rededicated as the Janet Gray Hayes Rotunda in honor of San Jose's former mayor, the first woman mayor of a major U.S. city.

== Artwork ==
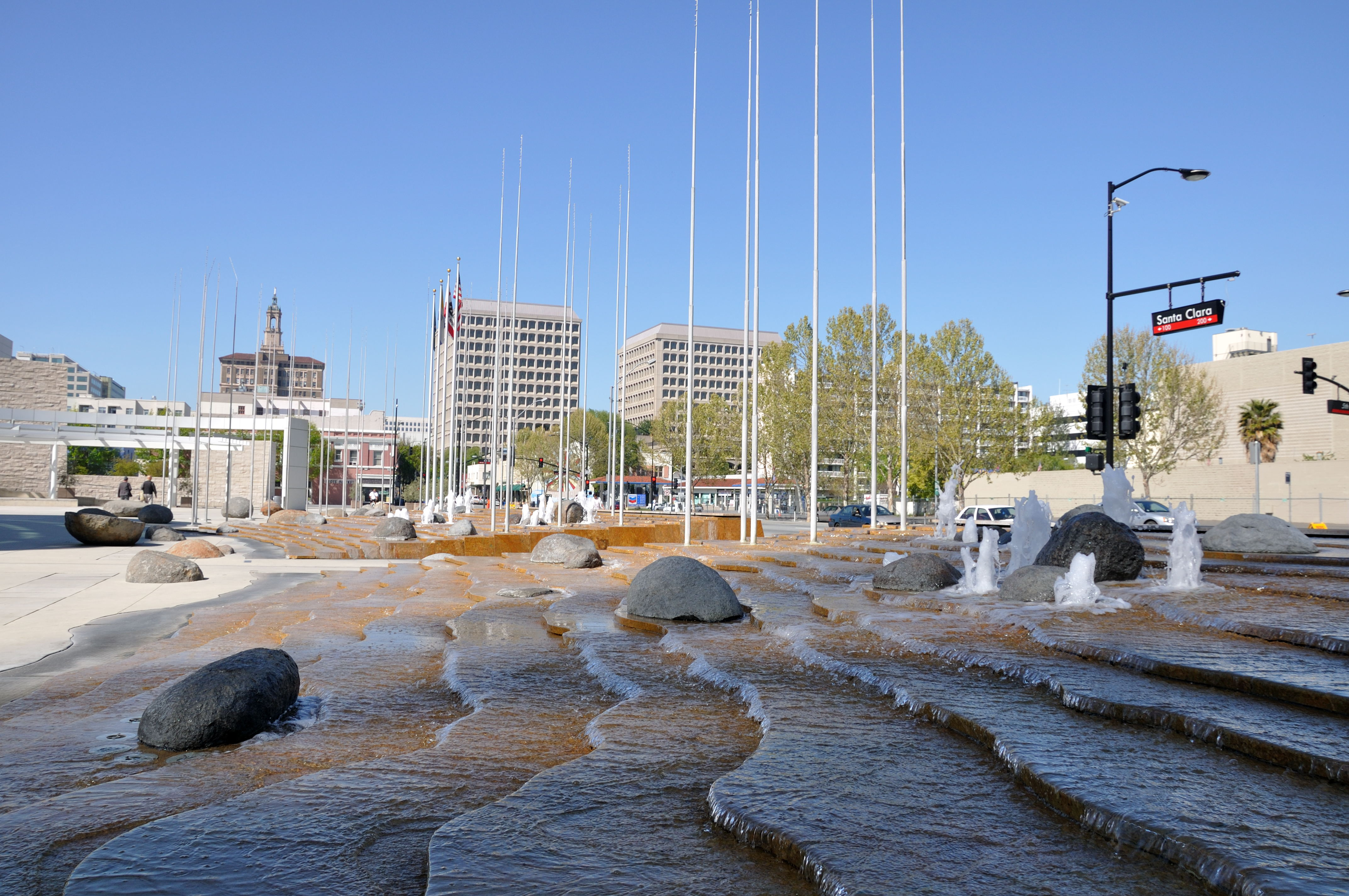
"Waterscape"

The front plaza facing East Santa Clara Street features "Waterscape", a 2005 water sculpture by Anna Valentina Murch and Douglas Hollis. It consists of a cascading fountain made of granite slabs, boulders that provide seating, and 20-foot-tall (6.1 m) vanes that spray mist onto the plaza from above to simulate fog and cool the plaza. The boulders also serve as bollards to protect the plaza against a vehicle attack. The rear courtyard at the end of South 5th Street originally featured a black bamboo grove.

Civic Plaza attracts relatively little foot traffic apart from organized events, owing in part to heat reflecting off City Hall and a lack of shade. However, temporary art installations occasionally attract crowds from the busier parts of downtown. A light art installation titled "Sonic Runway" illuminated the sidewalk on Santa Clara Street from November 3, 2017, to March 9, 2018, as part of the Playa to the Paseo partnership between the city and the Burning Man project. It returned in 2021 and is expected to remain on display until 2028. It consists of a tunnel of colorfully lit, pedestrian-activated arches set to music.

A 2005 series of 16 art installations by Andrew Leicester, titled "Parade of Floats", adorns various sidewalks in the neighborhood immediately surrounding city hall. Each float represents an element of San Jose's cultural and historical diversity. The floor of the westbound City Hall bus rapid transit stop features a collage that illustrates the patent filing process.

A 9-foot-tall (2.7 m), 4,000-pound (1,800 kg) statue of Christopher Columbus was installed in the lobby of the Civic Center facility in 1958 to celebrate the local Italian-American community. In the 2000s, the city moved it to the lobby of the current city hall. On March 10, 2018, the statue was removed from city hall and relocated to the Italian American Heritage Foundation following a petition by the Brown Berets.

== Environmental design ==
City Hall has received LEED Platinum certification for its environmentally friendly design. It is the largest LEED-certified municipal building in San Jose. The tower employs daylighting techniques, including high ceilings, a thin floor plan, and side elevator shafts, to take advantage of an average 300 days of sun annually and reduce artificial lighting costs. A brise soleil on the tower's west side provide shade during the summer, reducing cooling costs.

City Hall uses recycled water extensively, including for flushing toilets and irrigating landscaping. The "Waterscape" installation in front includes a rock fountain that also uses recycled water; however, the accompanying misting vanes must use potable water due to health regulations. The vanes operate during the warmer half of the year, spraying a total of 230 US gallons (870 L; 190 imp gal) annually.

== Events ==
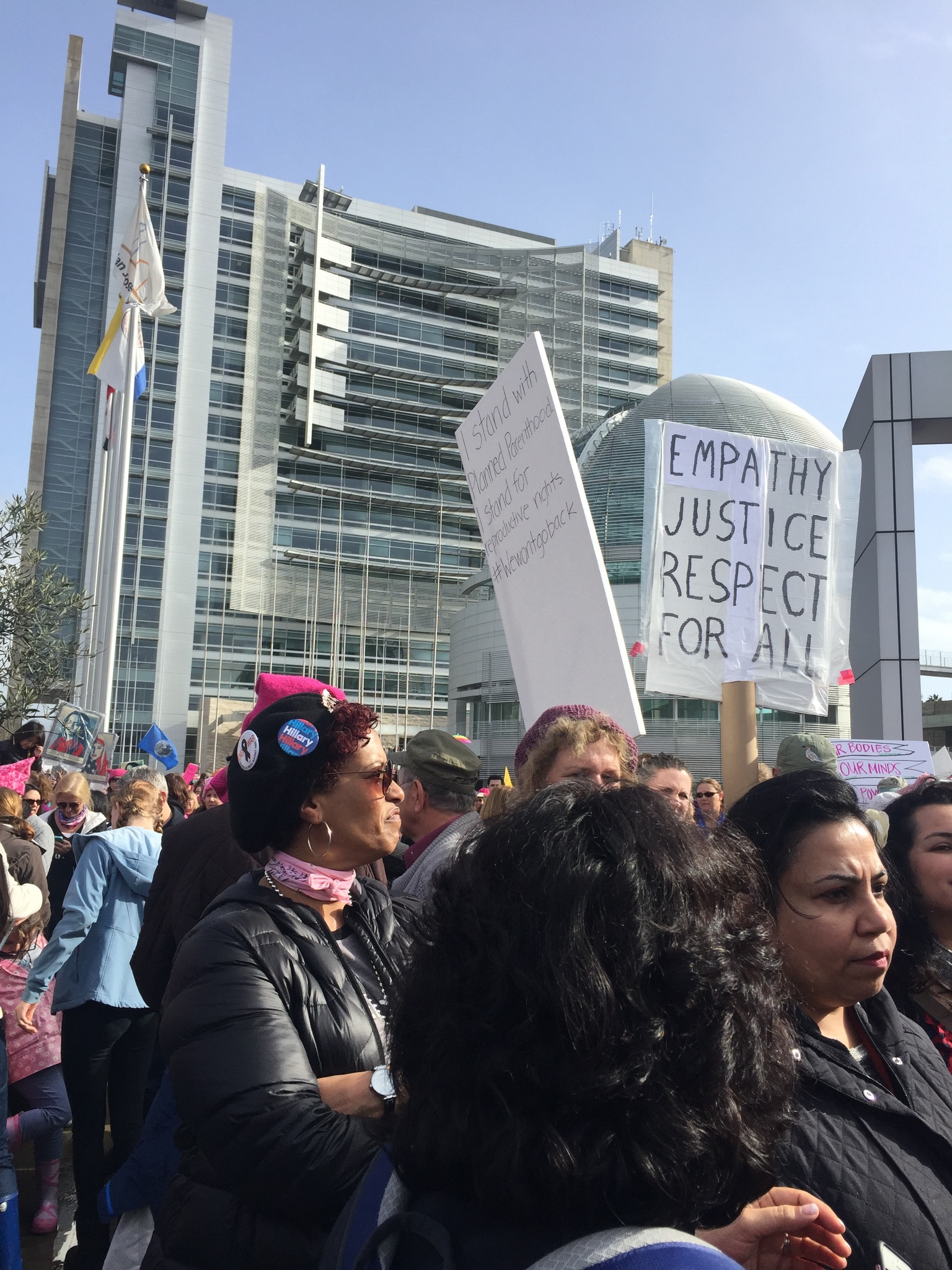
2017 San Jose Women's March

The front plaza facing East Santa Clara Street was designed as a public square. It regularly attracts political demonstrations. In 2007 and 2008, it was the site of protests and a hunger strike by Lý Tống regarding city council's initial refusal to name the city's main Vietnamese business district Little Saigon. Local versions of national rallies have been held at City Hall, including an immigration reform protest in 2006; Occupy San José in 2011; Not My Presidents Day, the Tax March, the March for Science, and the Women's March in 2017; March for Our Lives and Families Belong Together in 2018; and the George Floyd protest in 2020. The previous city hall also attracted political demonstrations, including marches following the police shooting deaths of John Henry Smith in 1971 and Bich Cau Thi Tran in 2003. The plaza also hosts vigils, such as one for victims of the 2021 VTA rail yard shooting.

An automated lighting system was installed in the rotunda in June 2017, enabling the tower and rotunda to be colorfully lit to mark special occasions.

== Fauna ==
The City Hall tower is home to a peregrine falcon named Clara, and her current tiercel, named "Esteban Colbert" after Stephen Colbert, of whom Mayor Chuck Reed was said to be a fan. The original falcons, named Jose and Clara after the city and Santa Clara County, produced three offspring, named Spirit, Hiko, and Esperanza. In 2008, Clara and her then-mate Carlos had three chicks, Cielo and Meyye, both girls, and Mercury, a boy.

== Neighborhood ==
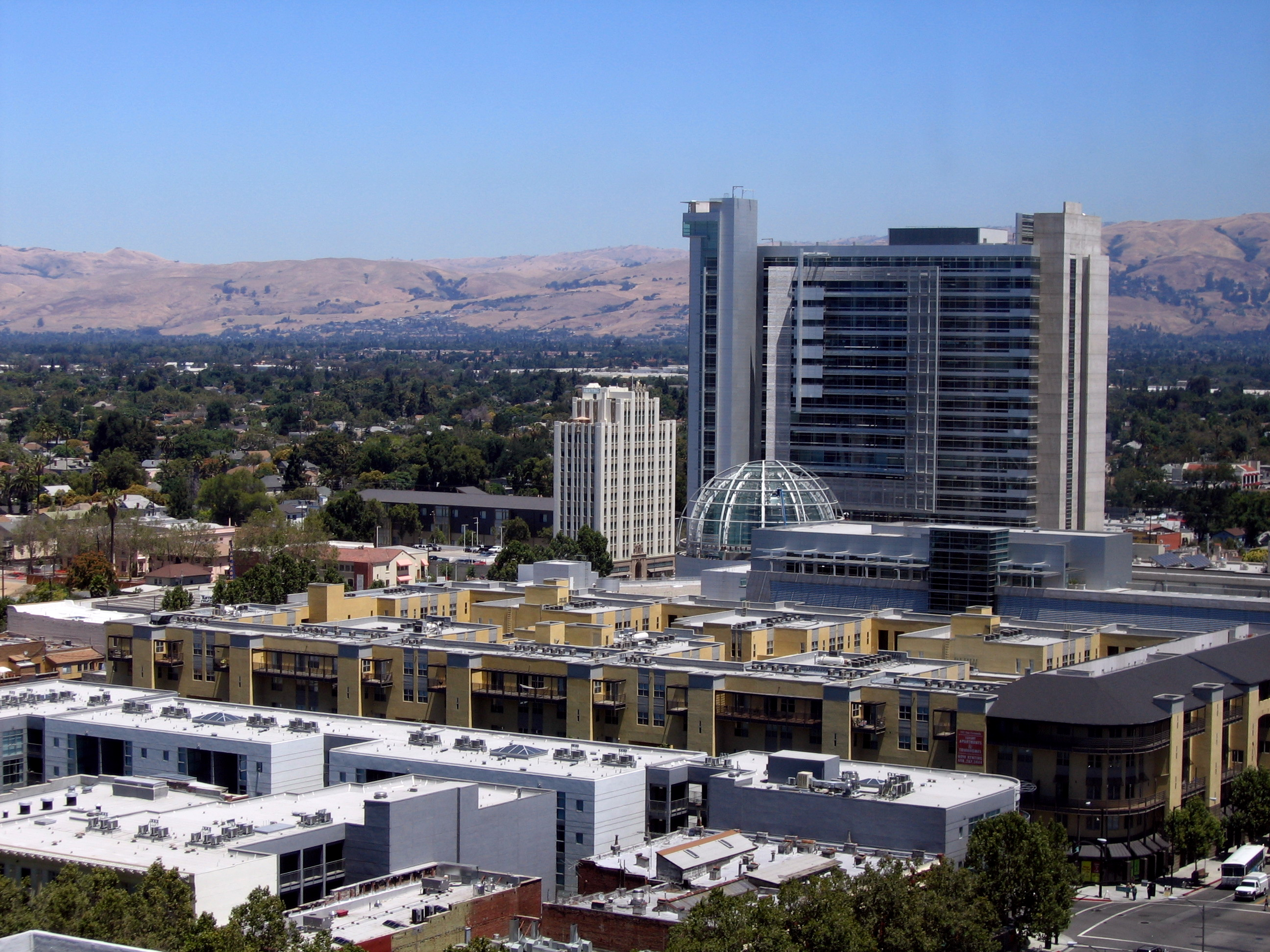
The neighborhood around City Hall

Civic Plaza is located on the eastern edge of the downtown San Jose retail area. It is bounded by East Santa Clara Street to the north, South 4th Street to the west, South 6th Street to the east, and a dead end of South 5th Street to the south. The Rotary Club of San Jose maintains a summit center adjacent to City Hall. San Jose State University's main campus and the Dr. Martin Luther King Jr. Library are located one block to the south across East San Fernando Street. A Lee's Sandwiches store is located across South 6th Street, at the site where the chain began in 1983. The former First Presbyterian Church of San Jose is located directly across East Santa Clara Street, and Our Lady of La Vang Parish is located two blocks to the east.

=== Transportation ===
The Civic Plaza complex includes an underground parking garage for city officials, as well as a city-owned public parking garage one block to the north. Unlike the Civic Center city hall, the current city hall lacks direct access to freeways. The Santa Clara Valley Transportation Authority's Santa Clara light rail station is located two blocks to the west.

In 2000, Santa Clara County voters approved Measure A to fund a package of public transportation projects, including a Downtown/East Valley light rail line along East Santa Clara Street that would have stopped at City Hall. However, subsequent budget cuts forced the project to be scaled back to an extension of an existing light rail line that does not serve City Hall. Instead, an Alum Rock–Santa Clara bus rapid transit line was built along the street, with a City Hall stop at 6th Street.

A Civic Plaza/San José State University station was also planned as part of the Silicon Valley BART extension. It would have been located underneath East Santa Clara Street between 4th and 7th streets, with station entrances in the vicinity of City Hall. In May 2007, the proposed station was consolidated with the Plaza de César Chávez station into a single Downtown San José station between 2nd and San Pedro streets, in order to reduce costs and more directly connect to VTA light rail lines.

== In film and television ==
The City Hall rotunda appears in the 2009 Bollywood film Love Aaj Kal as the corporate headquarters of the fictional architectural firm Golden Gate Engineering. It also appeared in an August 2013 episode of the CBS television series Unforgettable as a New York City auditorium.
