= Fairmont Plaza =

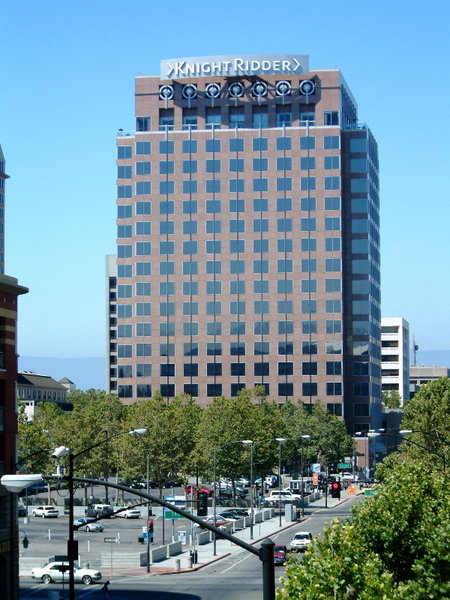
- Interactive map of the Fairmont Plaza area
- Former names: Knight-Ridder Building; Silicon Valley Financial Center

General information
- Status: Completed
- Type: Commercial offices
- Architectural style: Postmodern
- Location: 50 West San Fernando; San Jose, California
- Coordinates: 37.3336°N 121.8892°W
- Completed: 1988
- Owner: CBRE Global Investors

Height
- Roof: 79.55 m (261.0 ft)

Technical details
- Floor count: 17
- Floor area: 326,000 ft^{2} (30,300 m^{2})
- Lifts/elevators: 6

Design and construction
- Architect: Skidmore, Owings & Merrill

Fairmont Plaza (previously the Knight-Ridder Building) is a 17-story, 79.55 m (261.0 ft) skyscraper in downtown San Jose, California. When completed in 1988, it was the tallest building in the city; it is currently the sixth. The building was designed by the Skidmore, Owings & Merrill architecture firm.

== History ==
Fairmont Plaza is located on a site that was once the center of the Santa Clara Valley's Chinese American community. The Market Street Chinatown occupied the block from 1866 to 1887, when it was destroyed in a racist arson attack. In 1909, San Jose's first skyscraper, the seven-story, Garden City Bank & Trust Building, was erected on the site. Charles Herrold operated one of the first radio stations in the world from the building. The building was replaced in 1926 by the seven-story, American Trust Building, which in turn was razed in 1973.

Fairmont Plaza was completed in 1988. At the time, it was the tallest building in San Jose.

In 1998, newspaper publisher Knight Ridder moved its headquarters from Miami to the building, renaming it the Knight-Ridder Building. The move was seen as an acknowledgement of the central role that online news would play in the company's future. The McClatchy Company purchased Knight Ridder in 2006, but the company's sign remained at the top of the building until 2016.

CBRE Global Investors purchased the building in 2012 about US$90 million.
