= Adobe World Headquarters =

Office skyscraper complex, California

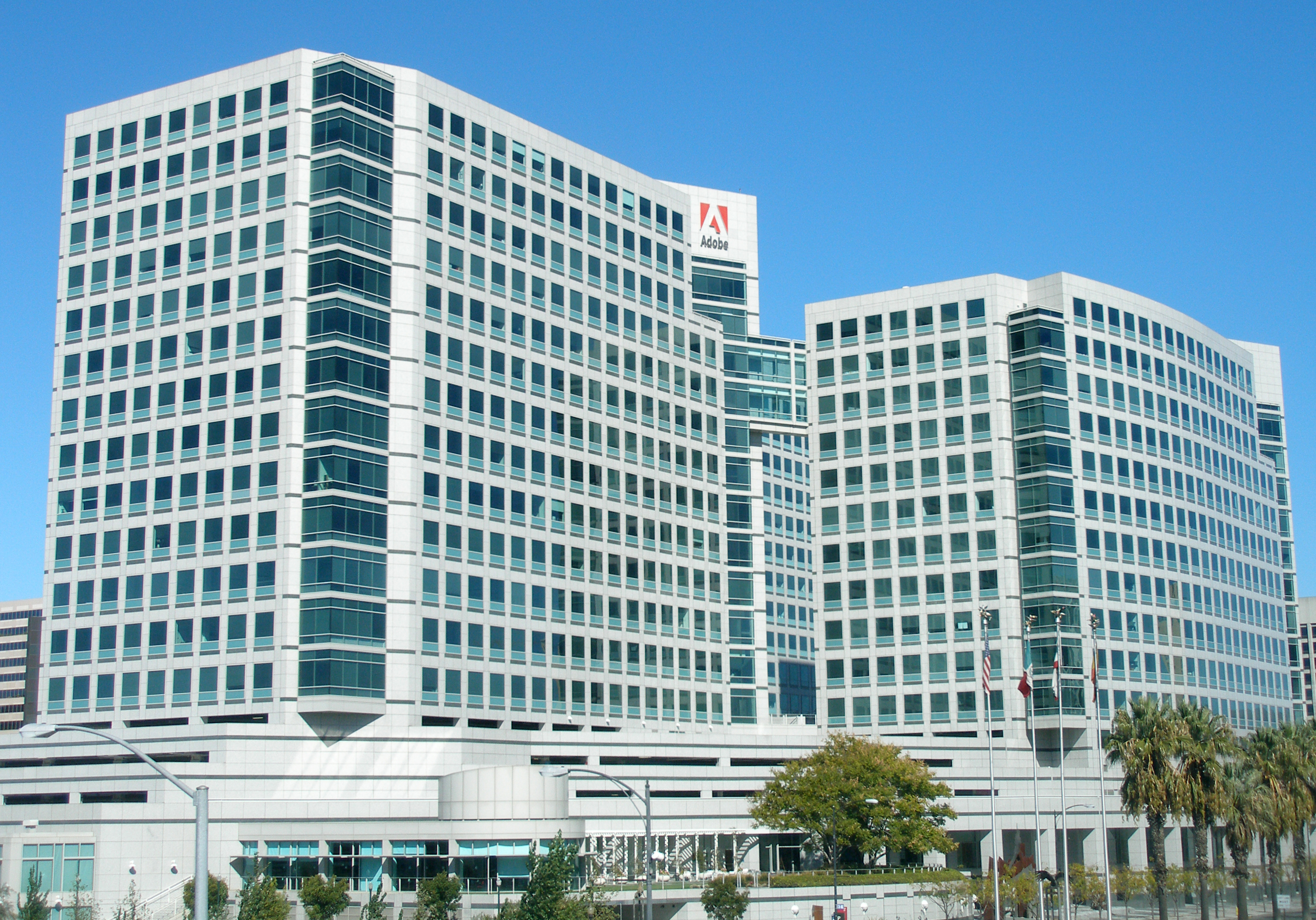
- Interactive map of the Adobe World Headquarters area
- Alternative names: Adobe Systems Headquarters complex Adobe Systems I, II & III

General information
- Status: Completed
- Type: Commercial offices
- Architectural style: Modernism
- Location: 151 South Almaden Boulevard; San Jose, California
- Coordinates: 37.331°N 121.894°W
- Opening: West: 1996; East: 1998; Almaden: 2003; Founders: 2023
- Owner: Adobe Systems

Height
- Roof: West Tower: 78.9 m (259 ft); East Tower: 71.9 m (236 ft); Almaden Tower: 72 m (236 ft)

Technical details
- Floor count: West Tower: 18; East Tower: 16; Almaden Tower: 18
- Floor area: 980,953 ft^{2} (91,133.5 m^{2})

Design and construction
- Architect: Hellmuth, Obata & Kassabaum
- Structural engineer: Nishkian Menninger
- Main contractor: Devcon Construction

The Adobe World Headquarters is the corporate headquarters of Adobe Systems, located in San Jose, California.

== Towers ==
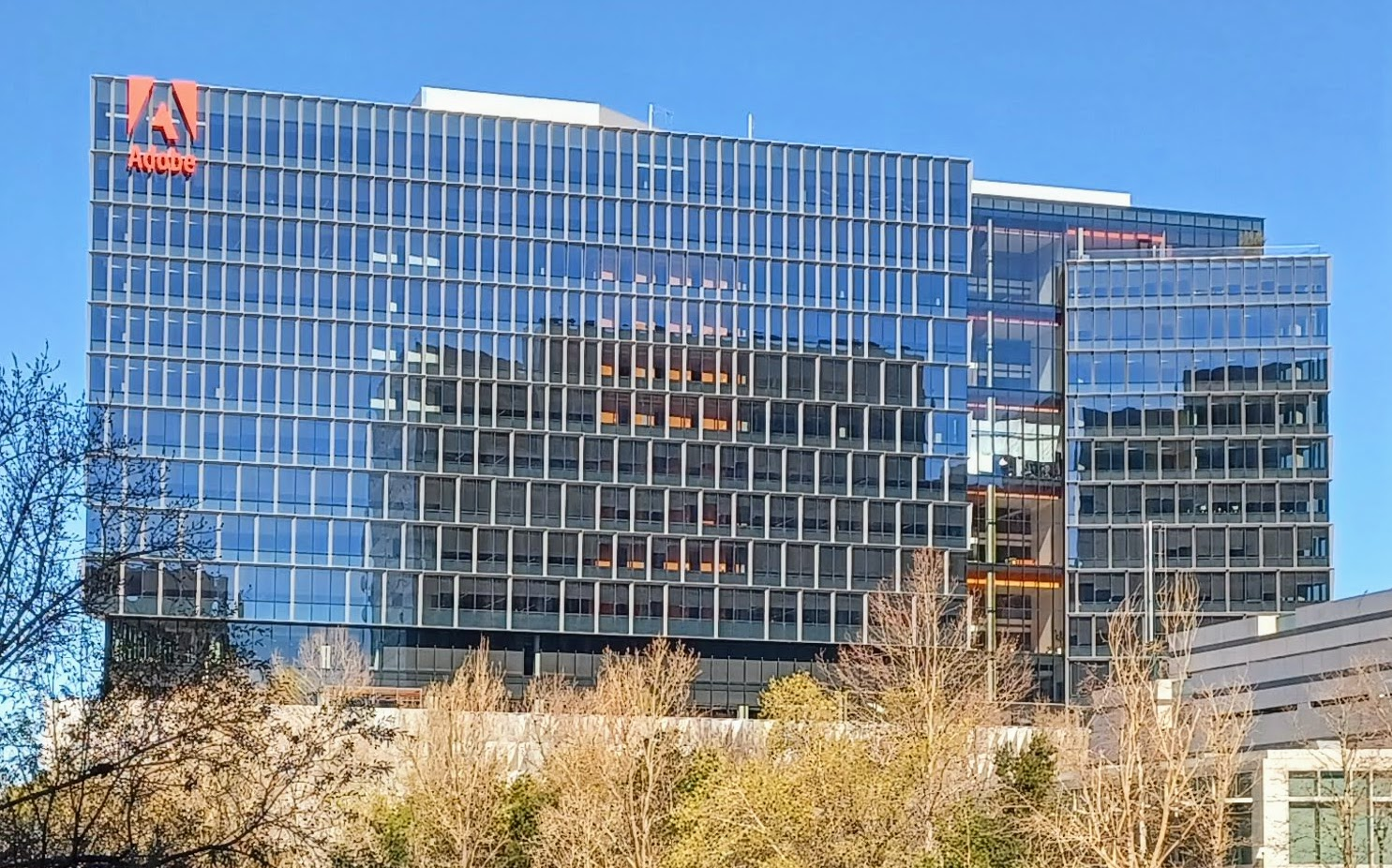
Founders Tower, built in 2023.

The complex consists of four towers: West, East, Almaden, and Founders Tower. The 18-story, 78.9 m (259 ft) West Tower, first built in 1996, was the sixth tallest in the city of San Jose, and has 391,000 sq ft (36,300 m^{2}) of office space. The 16-story, 71.9 m (236 ft) East Tower has 325,000 sq ft (30,200 m^{2}) of office space, and was constructed next to the West Tower in 1998. In 2003, 17-story 72 m (236 ft) Almaden Tower was completed adding 273,000 sq ft (25,400 m^{2}). In 2023, The 18-story Founders Tower was completed, adding 1,250,000 sq ft (116,000 m^{2}). The buildings are situated atop of a 938,473-square-foot (87,187 m^{2}) enclosed parking garage. Both the West and East towers house Adobe's Research and Development and Sales and Marketing departments, while the Almaden Tower houses administration and staff.

The Founders Tower was completed after Adobe changed the typeface on its logo in 2017, but features the pre-2017 logo for consistency with the three other towers.

== Design ==
The buildings are known for their green design. The West Tower is listed as an Energy Star labeled building by the U.S. Environmental Protection Agency. In 2006, all three towers were awarded Leadership in Energy and Environmental Design (LEED) Platinum certification by the United States Green Building Council for environmental sustainability.

== San Jose Semaphore ==
Adobe's Almaden Tower is also notable for having the "San Jose Semaphore," an installation consisting of four rotating lights created in 2006 by artist Ben Rubin. The lights rotate every 7.2 seconds according to a code; the pattern was deciphered in 2007 by Mark Snesrud and Bob Mayo, who discovered the final message being Thomas Pynchon's The Crying of Lot 49. The duo published a whitepaper chronicling their process of decoding.

A new riddle was displayed in 2012; and the new code was deciphered in 2017 by high school teacher Jimmy Waters from Tennessee. Waters noticed that a particular sequence in the code might represent an audio silence. Running the full sequence through audio software and changing the pitch, he heard Neil Armstrong's "One small step for man" speech from the 1969 Apollo Moon landing.

On 11 May 2023, a new riddle was put up on the San Jose Semaphore. It was solved in Spring of 2026 by Brian Vincent, a software engineer from San Jose. The semaphores transmitted image of a rose from The Birth of Venus painting by Sandro Botticelli.
