= The 88 (San Jose) =

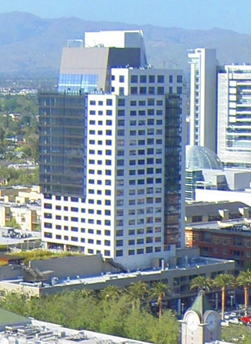
- Interactive map of the The 88 area
- Former names: Tower 88 @ Central Place; Central Place - North Tower

General information
- Status: Completed
- Type: Residential condominiums
- Architectural style: Modernism
- Location: 88 East San Fernando St. San Jose, California
- Coordinates: 37.33472°N 121.8872°W
- Construction started: November 2005
- Completed: 2006 – 2008
- Cost: $114.5 million

Height
- Roof: 87.2 m (286 ft)

Technical details
- Floor count: 22; 3 below ground
- Floor area: 54,341 m^{2} (584,920 sq ft)
- Lifts/elevators: 5

Design and construction
- Architects: HKS, Inc. SB Architects
- Developer: CIM Group
- Main contractor: Webcor Builders

Other information
- Number of units: 197

The 88 is a 22-story, 87.2 m (286 ft) residential skyscraper in downtown San Jose, California. Upon completion of the tower in 2008, the tower became the tallest building in the city, surpassing the 86.9 m (285 ft) San Jose City Hall that was completed in 2005.

== See also ==
- List of tallest buildings in San Jose
