= Occupy San José =

Protest group against economic inequality

- Part of the "Occupy" protests
- Date: 2 October 2011 – October 2012
- Location: San Jose, California, United States
- Caused by: Economic inequality, corporate influence over government, inter alia.
- Methods: Demonstration, occupation, protest, street protesters

Arrests and injuries
- Injuries: 0
- Arrested: 8

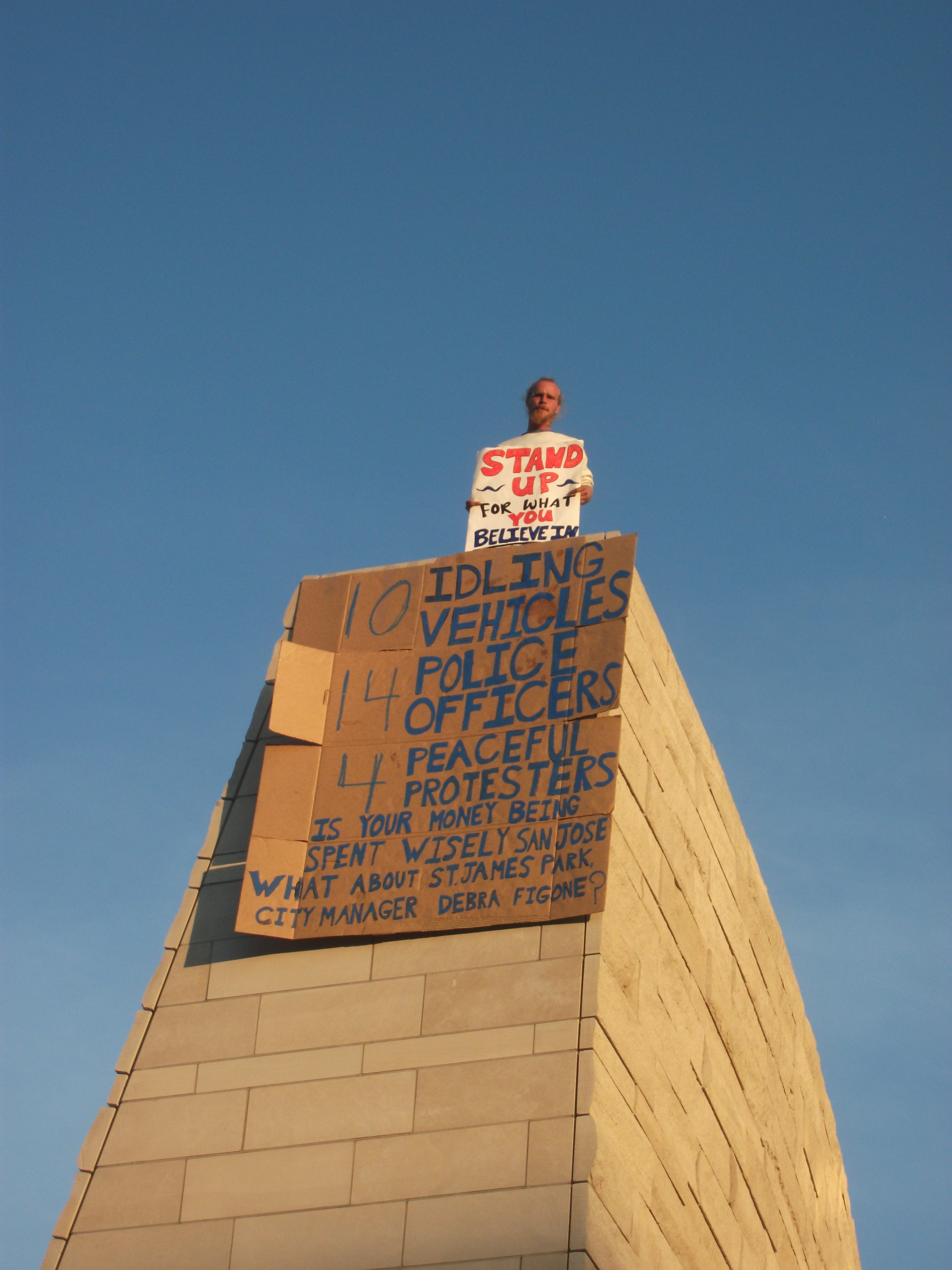
Occupy San José protester takes to City Hall Rotunda Roof

Occupy San José was a peaceful protest and demonstration in City Hall Plaza in San Jose, California. The demonstration was inspired by Occupy Wall Street and is part of the larger "Occupy" protest movement. The aim of the demonstration was to begin a sustained occupation in downtown San José, the 10th largest city in the United States, to protest perceived corporate greed and social inequality, including opposing corporate influence in U.S. politics, the influence of money and corporations on democracy and a lack of legal and political repercussions for the 2008 financial crisis.

== Chronology of events ==
On September 17, 2011, Occupy Wall Street protests began in New York. On October 6, after four nights of occupying San José City Hall, City Attorney Rick Doyle announced plans to ask the San Jose Police Department to order protestors to leave on Friday. Around 12:30 AM on October 10, one protester was cited by police when he refused to vacate the Occupy San José site. All other protestors and their belongings were moved off-site by police, though by early morning some protestors had returned. On October 21 at around 3:00 AM, eight protestors were arrested and one cited by San José city police. City ordinances prohibit overnight camping on public property. Police stated that vandalism and sanitation issues also were a factor.

As of June 2012, Occupy San José had continued to engage in organized meetings and actions. After a year of actions and twice-weekly assemblies, Occupy San José celebrated their anniversary on October 6, 2012.

== San José city ordinance on camping in city hall plaza ==
Section 13.23.300.H of the San José Municipal Code of Ordinances states:

"No person shall camp on the city hall plaza. No person shall enter or remain on the plaza (except the sidewalks) after closing time, as established by the regulations, unless authorized to do so by the director."

== See also ==
Occupy articles

- List of global "Occupy" protest locations
- Occupy movement
- Timeline of Occupy Wall Street
- We are the 99%

Other Bay Area "Occupy" protest articles

- Occupy Oakland
- Occupy San Francisco

Other 2011 protests

- 15 October 2011 global protests
- 2011 United States public employee protests
- 2011 Wisconsin protests

Related articles

- Bank Transfer Day
- Arab Spring
- Corruption Perceptions Index
- Economic inequality
- Income inequality in the United States
- Tea Party protests
- Wealth inequality in the United States
