= First Unitarian Church of San Jose =

Historic church in California, United States

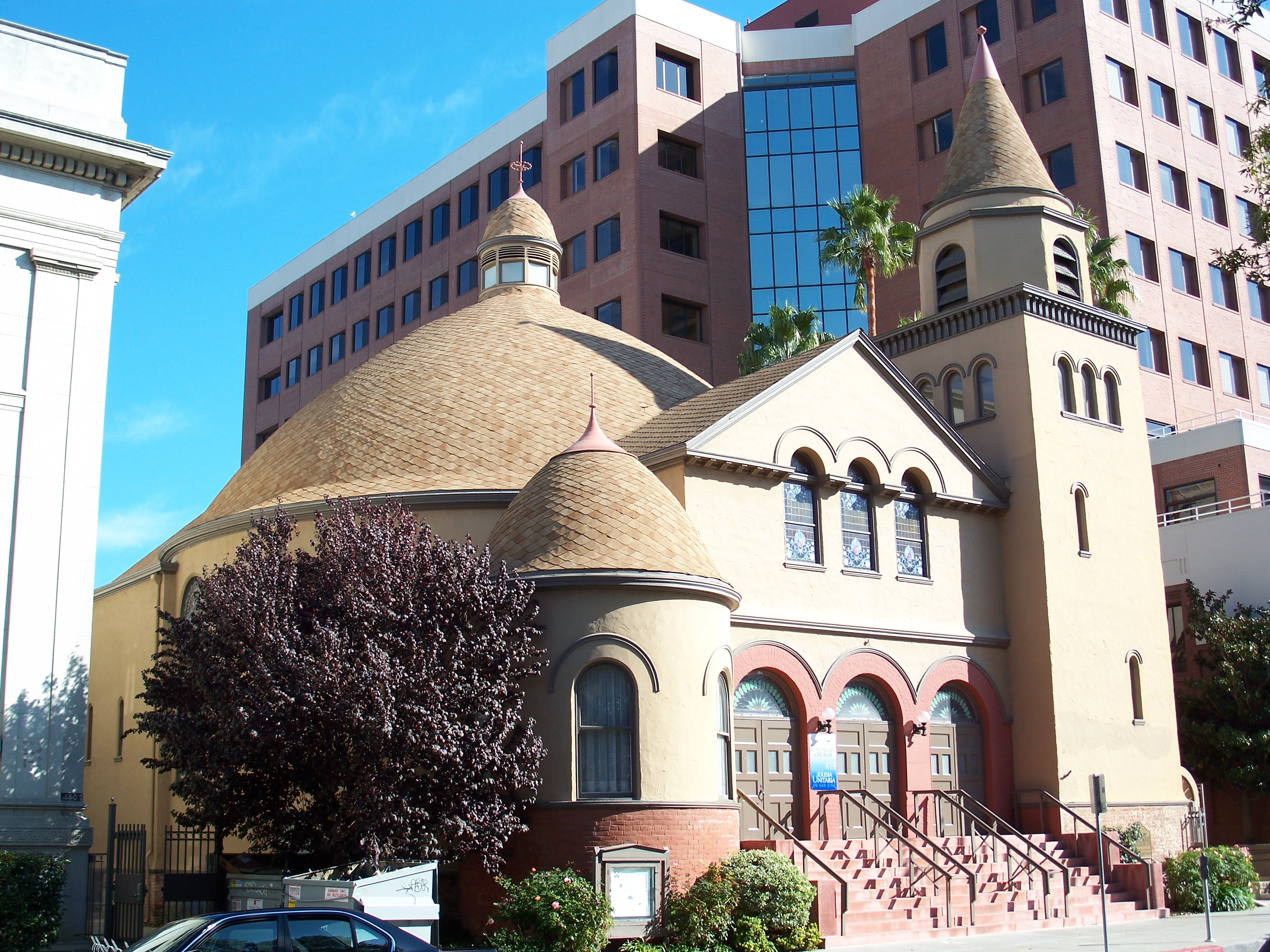
- View of the front of the church, facing southeast.
- Interactive map of First Unitarian Church of San Jose
- 37°20′23.02″N 121°53′23.65″W
- Location: 160 N. Third Street San Jose, California, USA

History
- Built: 1892

Site notes
- Governing body: First Unitarian Church of San Jose

U.S. National Register of Historic Places
- Official name: First Unitarian Universalist Church
- Reference no.: 77000343

California Historical Landmark
- Reference no.: 902

The First Unitarian Church of San Jose is located at 160 North Third Street in downtown San Jose, California, across from St. James Park, and was designed in "Richardsonian Romanesque" style by architect George Page, who also designed the Hayes Mansion. Local historian Linda Larson Boston called the building, “One of a handful of American churches patterned after Unitarian churches of Transylvania, it features a large triple-arched stained glass window on the facade, multiple domes and cupolas, and both round and square towers,” in her pamphlet, Highlights of San Jose, California’s St. James Park and Environs. The congregation purchased the site in 1888, and the cornerstone was laid in a ceremony on September 23, 1891. The building is registered on both the list of National Register of Historic Places and the list of California Historical Landmarks.

The church is a member of The Unitarian Universalist Association of Congregations (UUA) and "People Acting in Community Together".

== History ==
Unitarian Services in San José were first held in City Hall in November 1865, with 100 people in attendance. Mr. And Mrs. B.F. Watkins, residents of Santa Clara who belonged to the San Francisco Unitarian Church, were staunch supporters of the women's suffrage movement and organizers on behalf of the U.S. Sanitary Commission, which aided victims of the Civil War (and later became the Red Cross). They had decided that there was a need for a liberal religious presence in San José, and invited the Rev. Charles Gordon Ames to speak. Profoundly affected by his travels through the war-torn South, he devoted his first service to the freedom and dignity of all people, a theme that has echoed throughout the years at the First Unitarian Church, and which, at times, had led the church to take stands that were not popular with more conservative sections of the community. Among the early members of the church were A.T. Herman, a civil engineer who built the road up Mt. Hamilton; Dr. Benjamin Cory, San José's first physician and founder of what is now Santa Clara Valley Medical Center; J.J. Owen, editor and publisher of the San José Mercury; and J.E. Brown, state legislator.

In 2016, the church celebrated its 150th anniversary as a congregation in San Jose.

== Fire ==
On October 16, 1995, the church was gutted by a six-alarm fire that occurred during a major renovation project. For three years the congregation met at the community center across the street until the sanctuary was ready for services in 1998. Final restoration and renovation of the building cost $8 million, with work and fundraising continuing until 2001. One notable fundraiser featured actor Dustin Hoffman, who spent several months in 1996 filming Mad City at the San Jose Athletic Club next door.

== Third Street Community Center ==
As part of the renovation project, the church added classrooms and office space in its basement so that it could establish the Third Street Community Center in 1998. The center is a separate, non-sectarian non-profit that houses the Don Edwards Computer Learning Academy, an after-school program, and ESL classes serving low-income and immigrant neighbors.
