= Tower 55 =

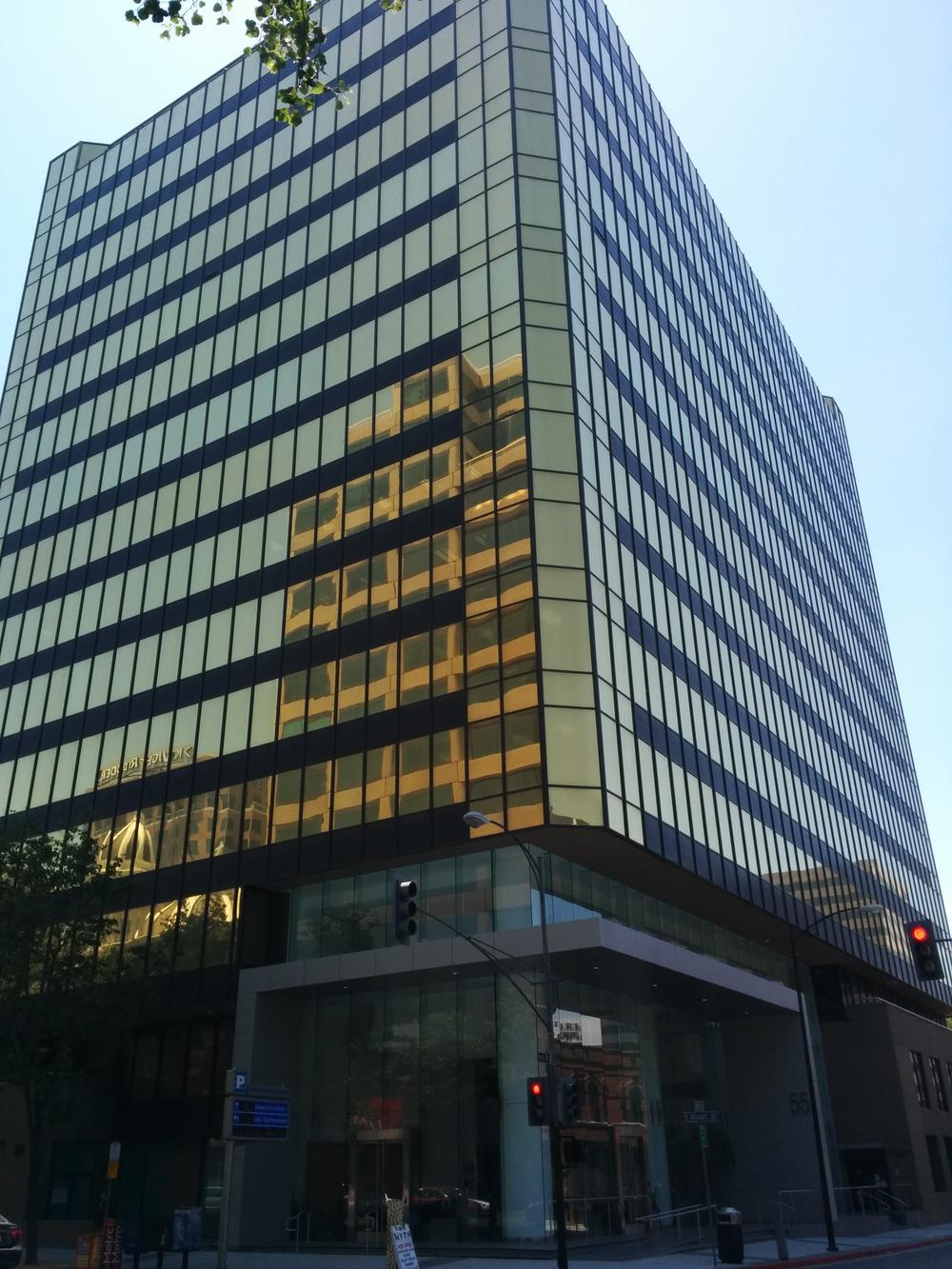
- Former names: Market Post Tower

General information
- Type: Commercial offices Data center
- Architectural style: Modernism
- Location: 55 South Market Street; San Jose, California
- Coordinates: 37.3342°N 121.8916°W
- Completed: 1984

Height
- Roof: 216.44 ft (65.97 m)

Technical details
- Floor count: 15
- Floor area: 27,000 m^{2} (290,000 sq ft)

Design and construction
- Architects: CRGP Limited; David Takamoto Associates

Tower 55 (formerly the Market Post Tower; also known as the Gold Building or simply 55 South Market) is a 15-story building at the corner of South Market Street and Post Street in downtown San Jose, California. Built in 1985 as the Market Post Tower, it was designed to provide a mix of office and retail space. When first built, the building was controversial due to its gold-colored glass exterior, which produced high light and heat reflection. In its early years, the owners struggled financially with the property and were forced to put it up for sale in 1987. While the intended tenants did not materialize, the building proved popular with telecom carriers as an Internet exchange center, with MAE-West on the 13th floor, one of the oldest and most well known Internet exchanges. Many carriers maintain collocation space in the building to support their interconnections through MAE-West (so-called "public peering") as well as direct interconnections ("private peering").

Tower 55 remains mixed-use, comprising office, telecom, and retail space, but it is perhaps most well known for its use by internet network service, peering, and colocation providers. The building was purchased in 2000 by The Carlyle Group, which further enhanced the building's network infrastructure, and now advertises it as a "multi-tenant carrier neutral telecom facility." CoreSite, a Denver-based wholesale provider of data centers, colocation and peering, currently handles tenant leases within the building.

San Jose's first public nude sculpture was located at the Market Post Building, but this was removed during building renovations in 2012. The federal Internal Revenue Service (IRS) occupies one entire floor of the building as a regional office.

In 2013, Market Post Tower was renovated and renamed Tower 55.
