= Three Sixty Residences =

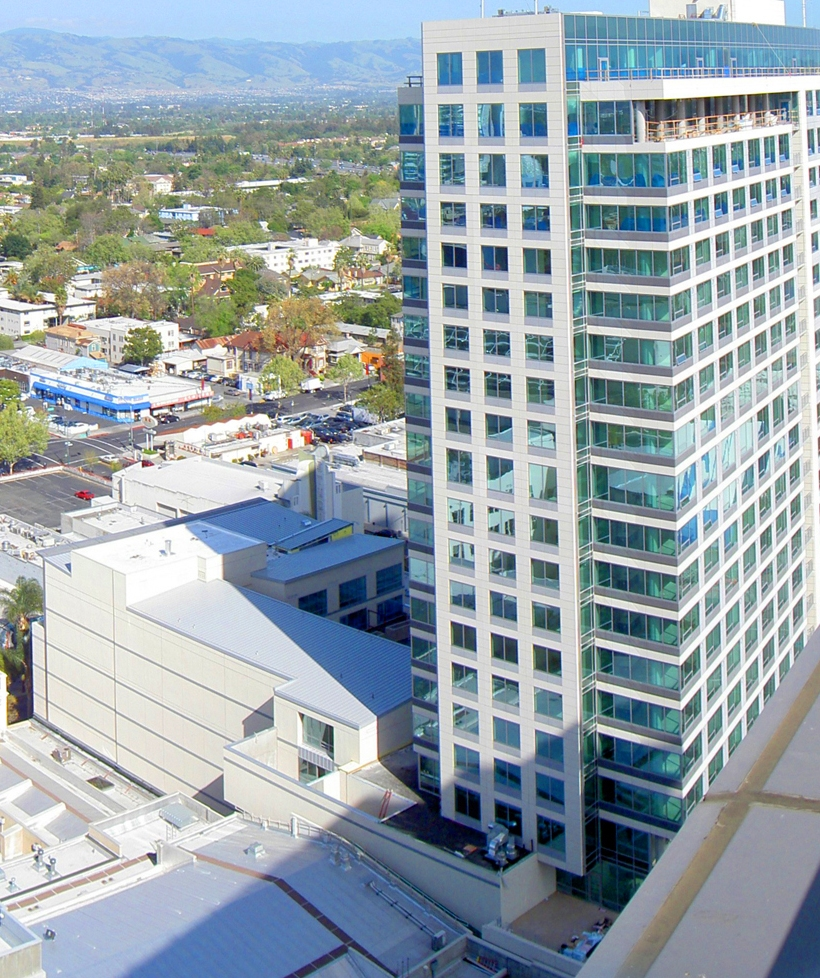
- Interactive map of the Three Sixty Residences area
- Alternative names: 360 Residences; The Heritage; The Californian

General information
- Status: Completed
- Type: Rental apartments
- Architectural style: Modernism
- Location: 360 South Market Street; San Jose, California
- Coordinates: 37.33°N 121.8866°W
- Construction started: 2006
- Completed: 2009

Height
- Roof: 82.18 m (269.6 ft)

Technical details
- Floor count: 23

Design and construction
- Architect: Solomon Cordwell Buenz

Other information
- Number of units: 213

Three Sixty Residences is a 22-storey, 82.18 m (269.6 ft) residential skyscraper in downtown San Jose, California. It is the fourth tallest building in the city. Originally built to be a condominium tower, the vacant Three Sixty was converted to luxury rental apartment units in 2010 after a downturn in the local real estate market.
