= Sobrato Office Tower =

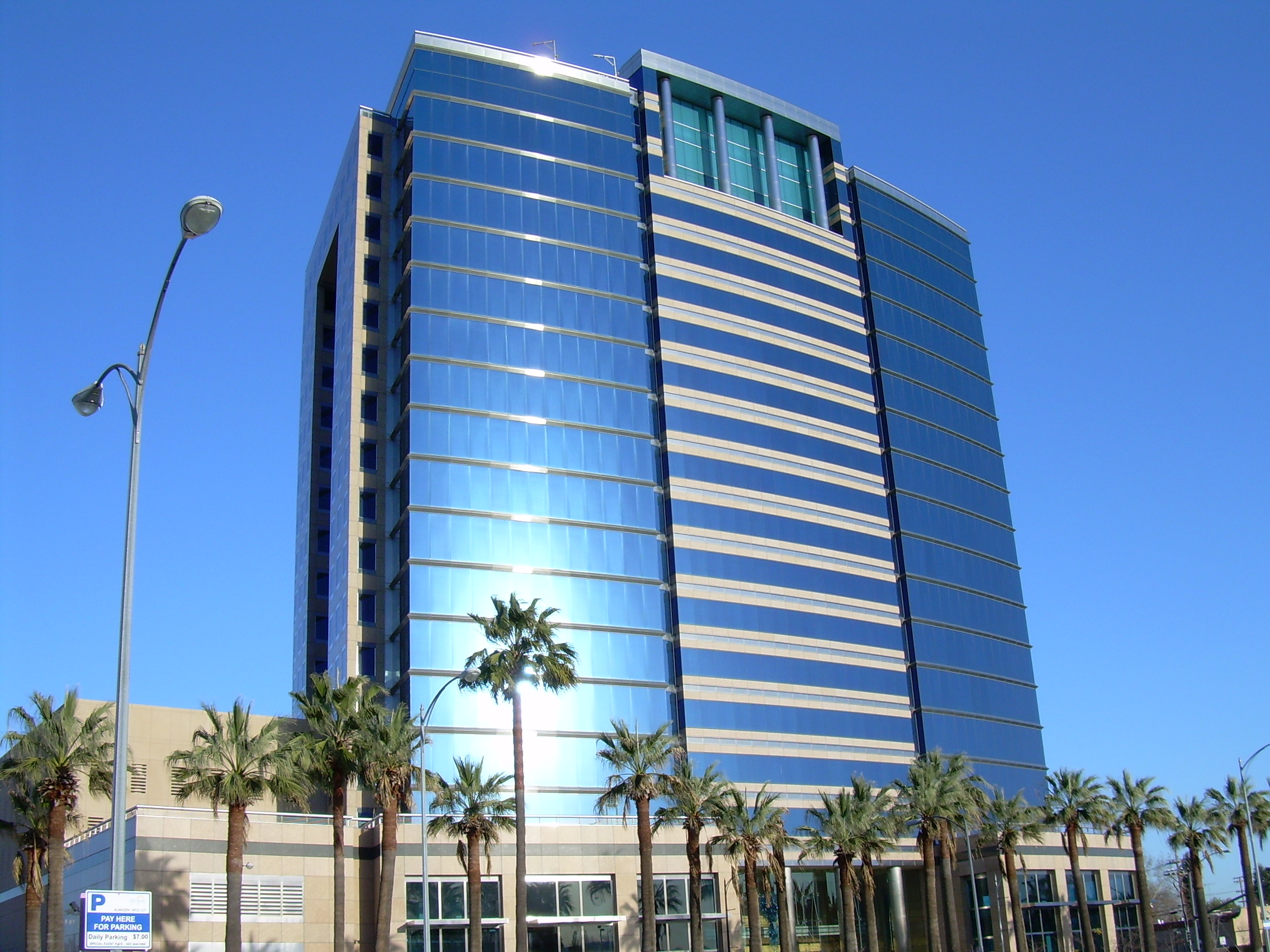
- Interactive map of the Sobrato Office Tower area

General information
- Status: Completed
- Type: Commercial offices
- Architectural style: Postmodern
- Location: 488 Almaden Boulevard; San Jose, California
- Coordinates: 37.3272°N 121.8891°W
- Groundbreaking: Fall 2000
- Completed: Winter 2002

Height
- Roof: 85.3 m (280 ft)

Technical details
- Floor count: 17; 3 below ground
- Floor area: 116,200 m^{2} (1,251,000 sq ft)

Design and construction
- Architect: Korth Sunseri Hagey Architects

Sobrato Office Tower is a 17-story, class-A office building located at 488 Almaden Boulevard in San Jose, California. It is the fourth tallest building in the city. The building was completed in 2002. It though remained unoccupied for nine years. In 2007 Sobrato sold the building for $135 million to BEA Systems, which itself was subsequently acquired / purchased by Oracle in 2008.

On November 17, 2010, it was announced that PricewaterhouseCoopers would lease 209,000 square feet (19,400 m^{2}) on eight floors (levels 10-17) of the building beginning June 2011, thus leaving their 165,000 ft^{2} (15,300 m^{2}) 10 Almaden Boulevard location in San Jose.

In 2021, shortly after its headquarters moved to Austin, TX from Redwood Shores, Oracle then sold the building for $155 million to PIMCO (global investment management firm) and Lane Partners (a Menlo Park, Calif.-based company that specializes in institutional-quality real estate in Northern California), making a profit of nearly $20 million over the course of its 13 year ownership.

In 5/2025, the building was then sold to the Santa Clara Valley Transportation Authority for $63.7 million, a price that was 60.9% below the property's assessed value of $163.1 million. The VTA stated that they plan move their current headquarters / staff to the building sometime in 2026.

== History ==
At different times, the City of San Jose, Nvidia, Sony, and BEA were each noted publicly to be negotiating to lease space in the building but none of those reported negotiations resulted in a tenancy.

Criticism of the building and possible reasons for its inability to attract tenants have often focused on its location being too far from downtown San Jose.

== Chihuly glass sculpture (Lobby) ==
As part of the initial development, the Sobrato family commission a glass sculpture from artist, Dale Chihuly. It is / was 19 feet tall and hung in the lobby. From photos, it resembled a huge “Pigpen” character in blue, entwining wild strands of glass. (People familiar with Chihuly’s art say such a piece could easily cost between $500,000 and $1 million).

In 2007, after the sale to BEA, the sculpture was apparently taken down and placed into storage. The sculpture apparently remained in storage under Oracle's ownership. As of 2025, it is unclear as to both the whereabouts or ownership of the sculpture.
