= Holy Cross Church (San Jose, California) =

Coordinates: 37°21′8″N 121°53′12″W

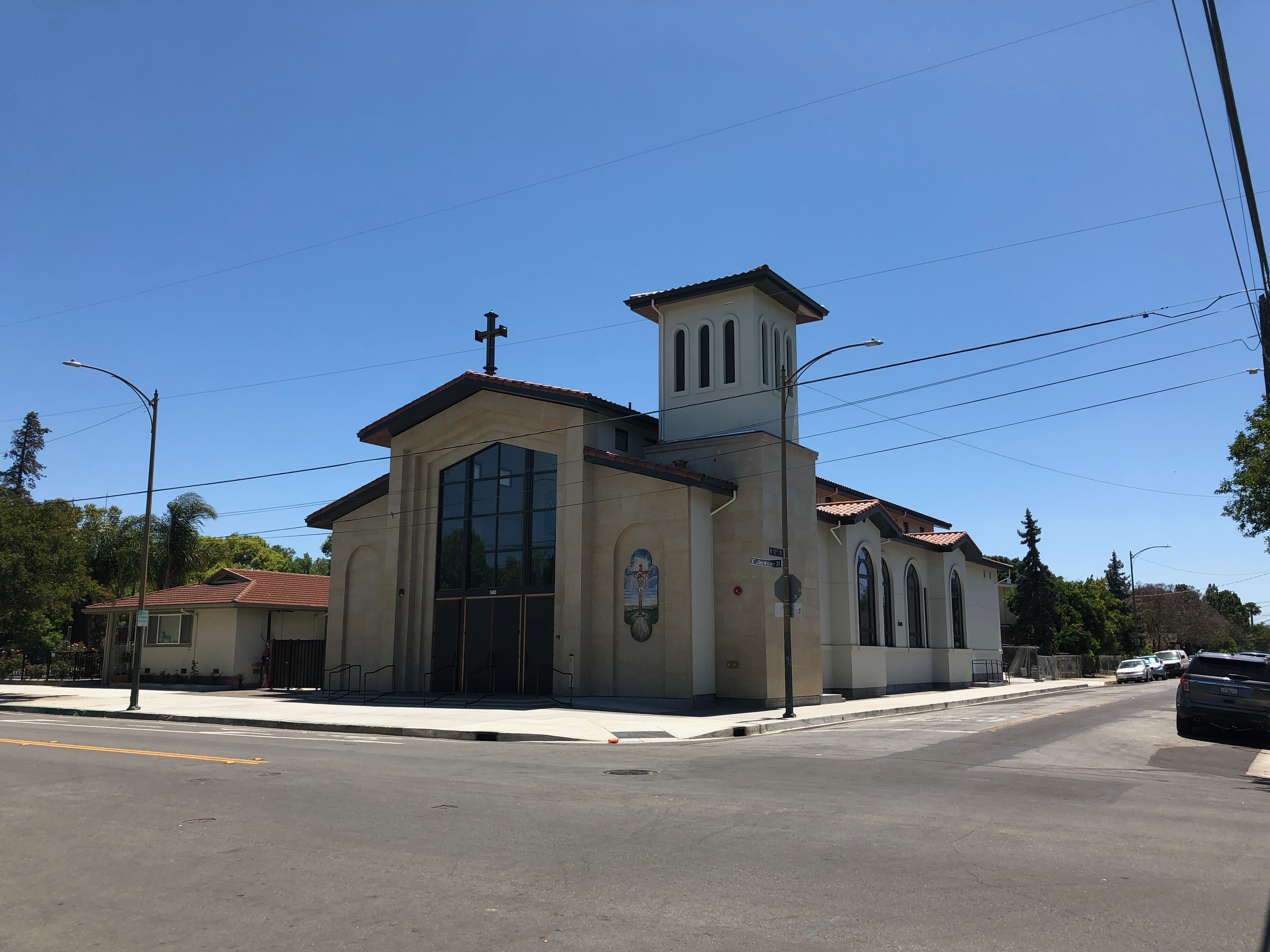
Holy Cross Church

Holy Cross Church is a Catholic church in the Northside neighborhood of San Jose, California, United States, that serves the Holy Cross Parish of the Diocese of San Jose. The parish is staffed by the Missionaries of St. Charles Borromeo (Scalabrinians). Holy Cross does not have a parochial school, though it hosts Confraternity of Christian Doctrine (CCD) programs for students of public schools.

The parish serves a multiethnic congregation and is considered a mainstay of the local Italian-American community. Masses are said in English, Spanish, and Italian.

== History ==
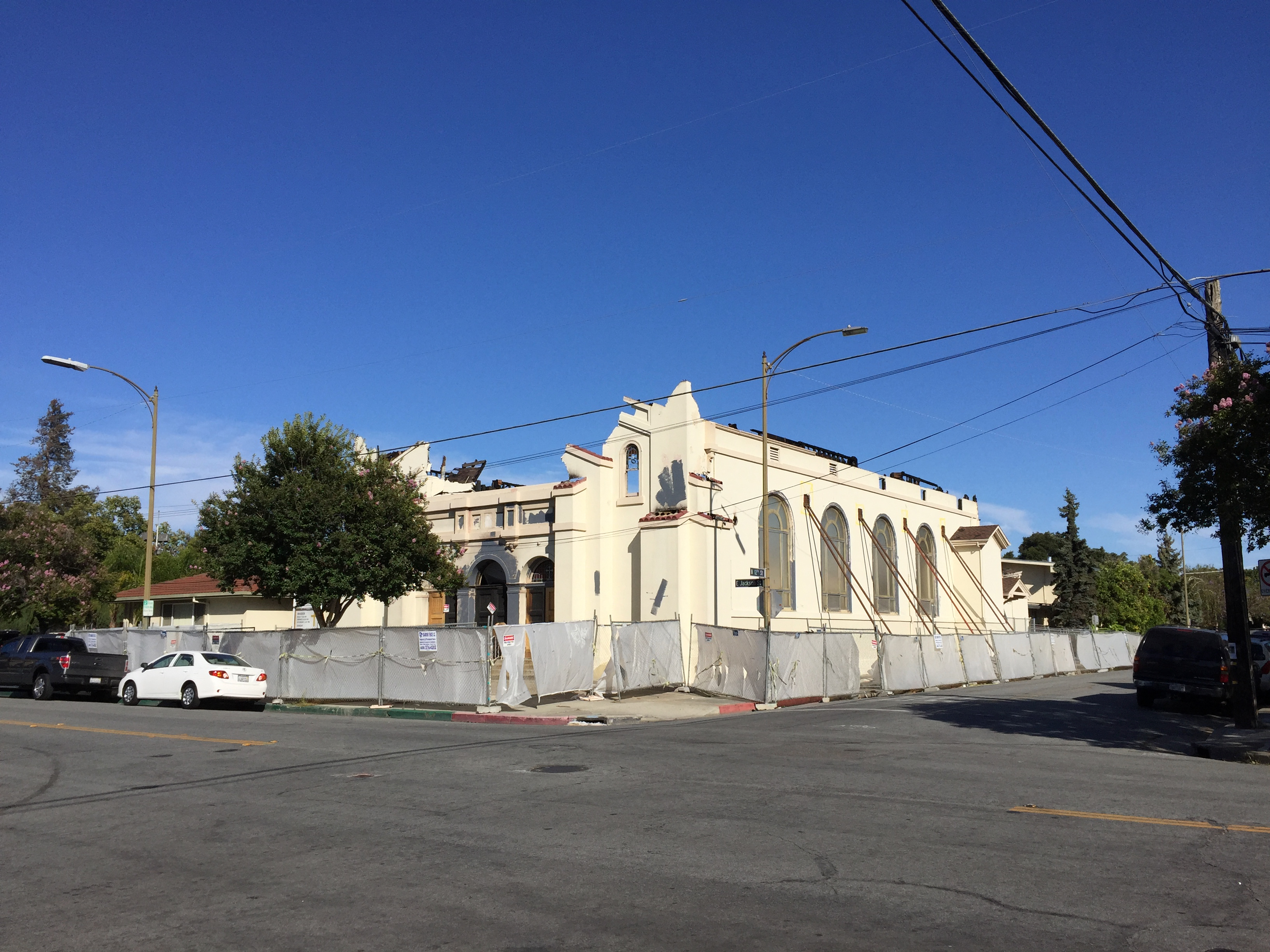
The original church building after the fire

Holy Cross Parish was founded in 1906 as a mission of Saint Patrick Parish to serve Italian immigrants in the Northside neighborhood of San Jose. The Diocese of San Jose had not yet been established; both parishes belonged to the Archdiocese of San Francisco. Holy Cross was designated an Italian national parish in 1911.

The parish's original church building was constructed in 1919 and dedicated in 1920. The structure was gutted by a four-alarm fire on November 16, 2014, and demolished in June 2015. After the fire, the parish held Masses in Scalabrini Hall, the parish bingo hall. On May 25, 2018, a new church building was dedicated on the site of the original church. Hanging above the altar is a 10-foot-tall (3.0 m) antique Italian gilded wood crucifix that had hung in the original church but was spared by the fire.
