= Japanese American Museum of San Jose =

Japanese American art museum in San Jose

Coordinates: 37.34754°N 121.89347°W

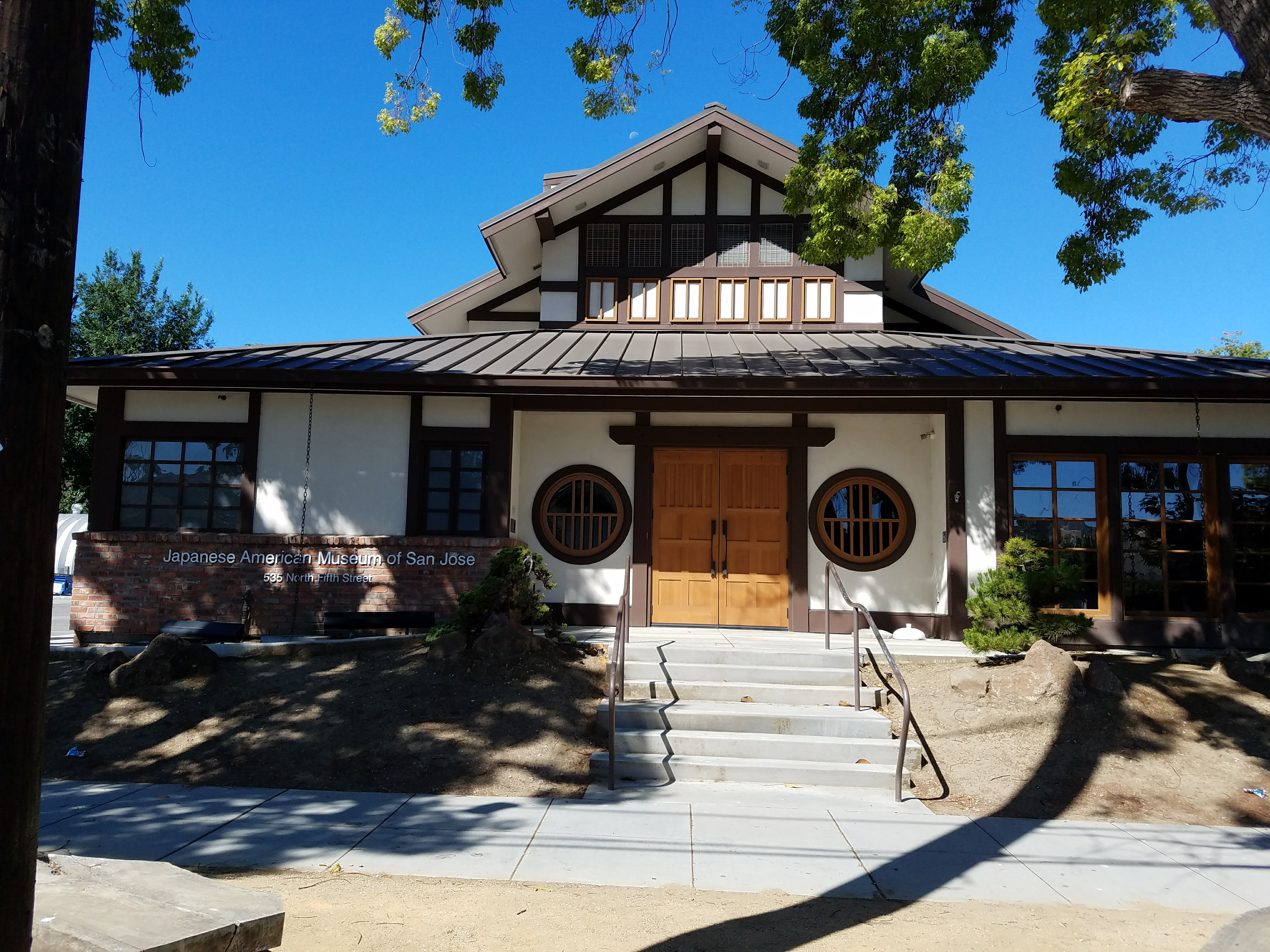
- Established: 1987
- Location: Japantown, San Jose, California
- Type: History and culture of Japanese Americans
- Website: www.jamsj.org

The Japanese American Museum of San Jose (JAMsj, Japanese: 日系アメリカ人サンノゼ歴史資料館, Nikkei Amerikajin Sannoze Rekishi Shiryōkan) is located at 535 N. Fifth Street in San Jose, in the heart of Japantown. The museum's mission is to collect, preserve, and share Japanese American art, history, and culture with an emphasis on the Greater San Francisco Bay Area.

== History ==
The JAMsj was established in November 1987. It grew out of a 1984-86 research project on Japanese American farmers in the Santa Clara Valley. The farming project collected family histories, historical photographs, private memoirs, and other unpublished documents and led to the development of a curriculum package on Japanese American history, which was adopted for use by the San Jose Unified and East Side Union High School Districts. JAMsj's workshop on developing family histories provided documentary materials and photos included in the award-winning book Japanese Legacy: Farming and Community Life in California's Santa Clara Valley (1985) co-authored by Timothy J. Lukes, Ph.D. and Gary Y. Okihiro, Ph.D.

The museum started in the historic Issei Memorial Building (formerly the Kuwabara Hospital) with the help and support of the Japanese American Citizens League, San Jose Chapter. In 2002, the name changed from Japanese American Resource Center/Museum (JARC/M) to Japanese American Museum of San Jose (JAMsj) to better reflect the museum's archival focus. JAMsj now occupies the former residence of Tokio Ishikawa, M.D. two doors south on North Fifth Street.

The original JAMsj building was demolished in 2008. The new museum re-opened in October, 2010.

== See also ==
- Japanese American National Museum
