= Japantown, San Jose =

Japantown
- Neighborhood of San Jose
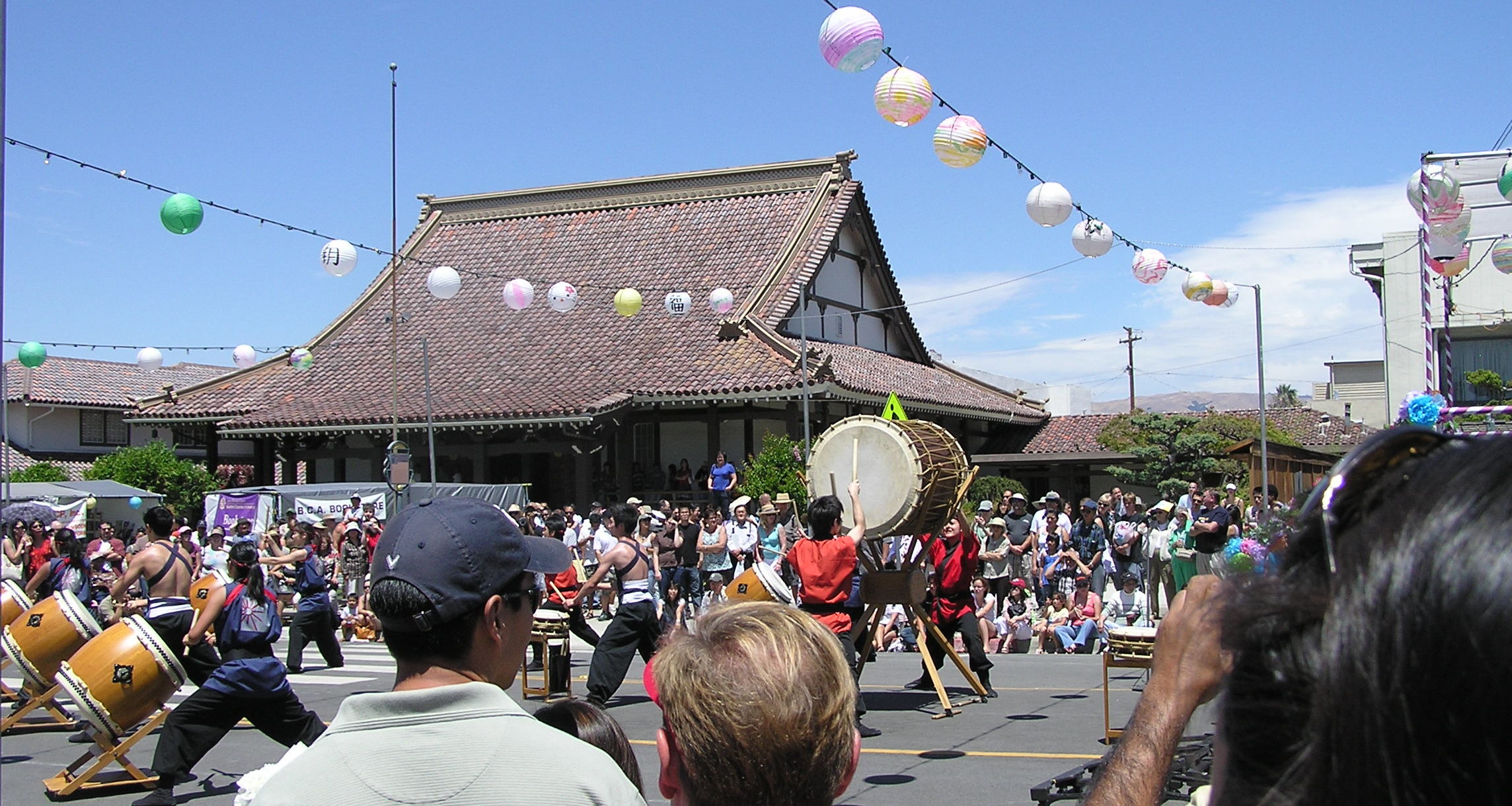
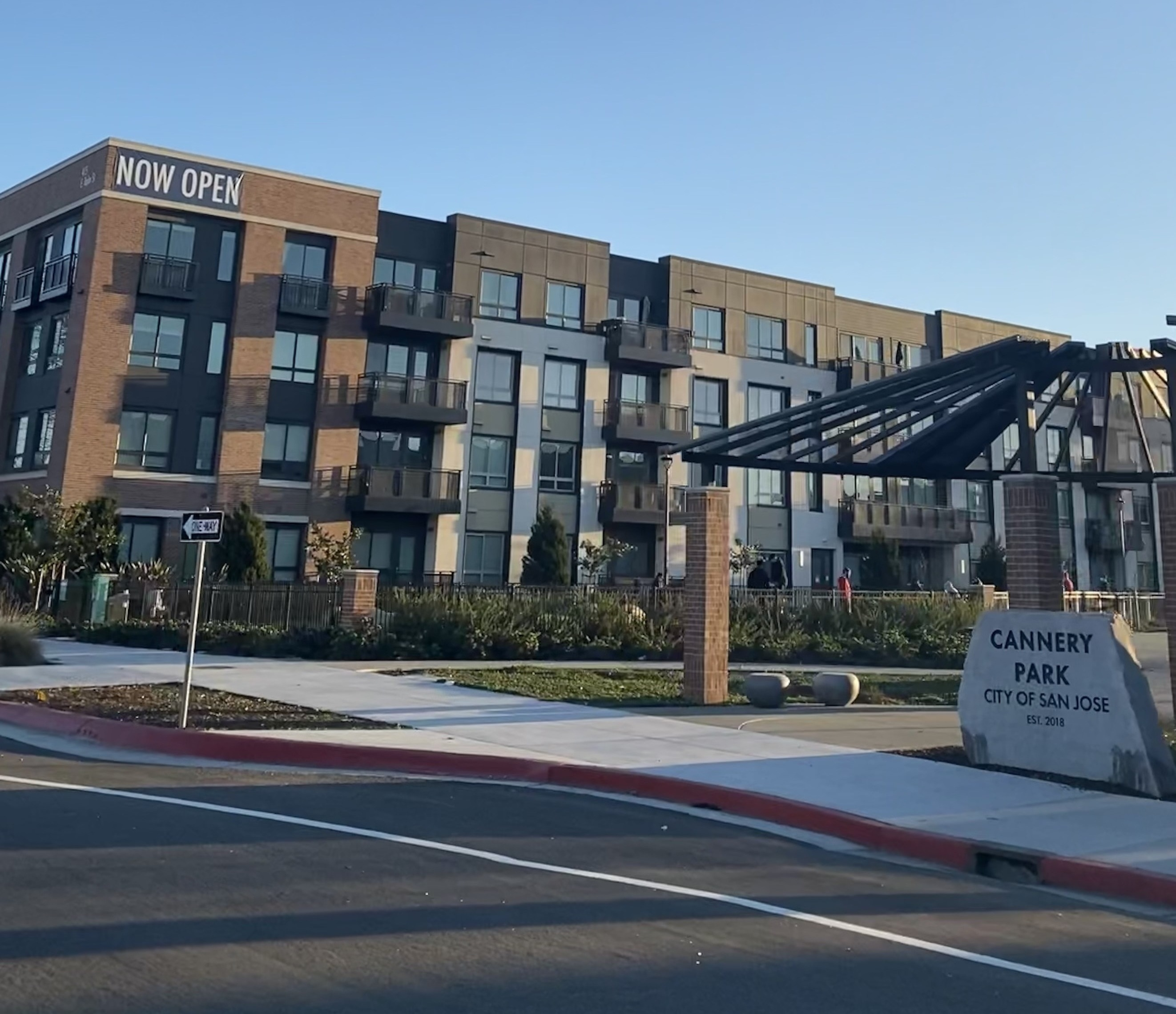
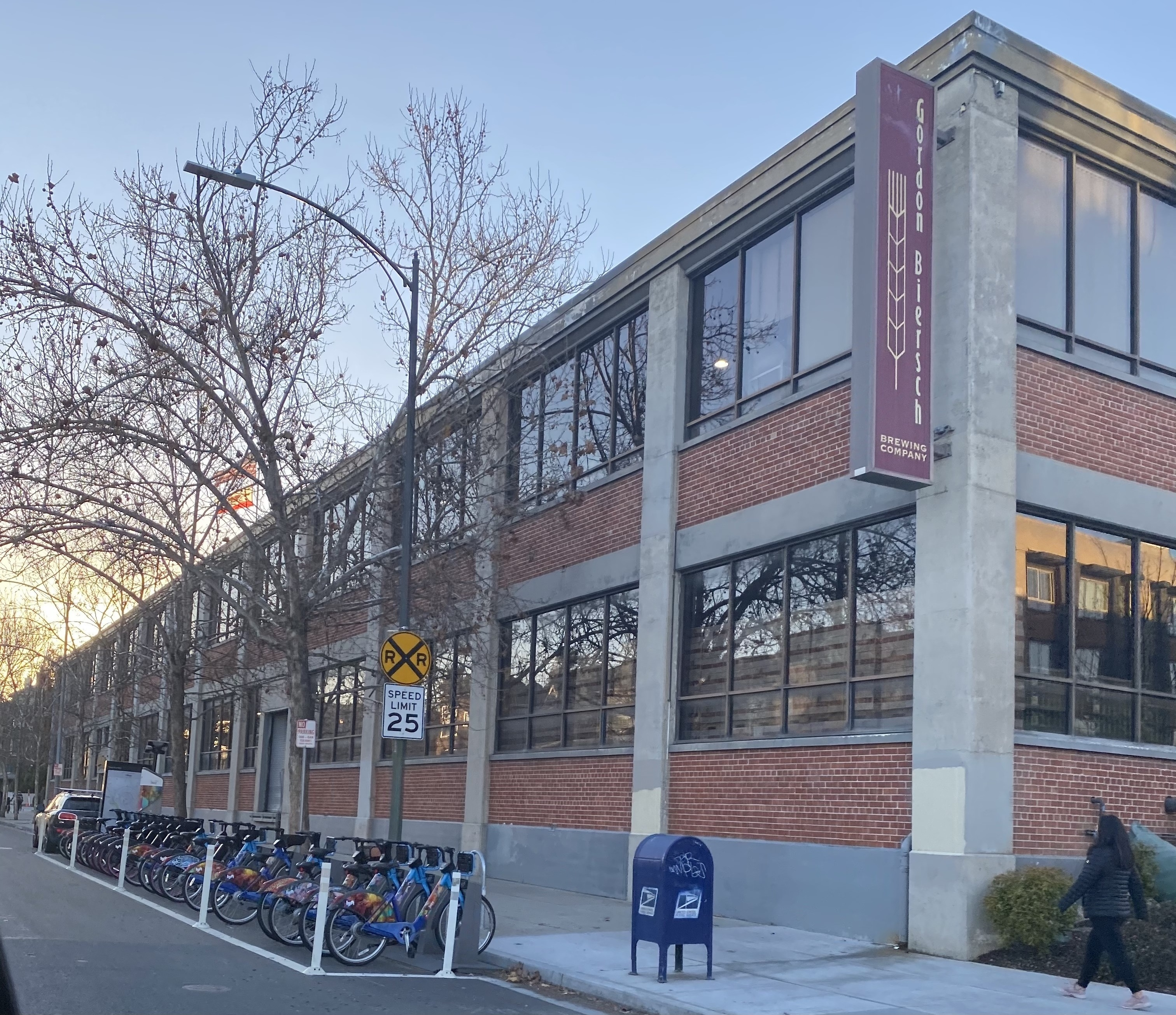
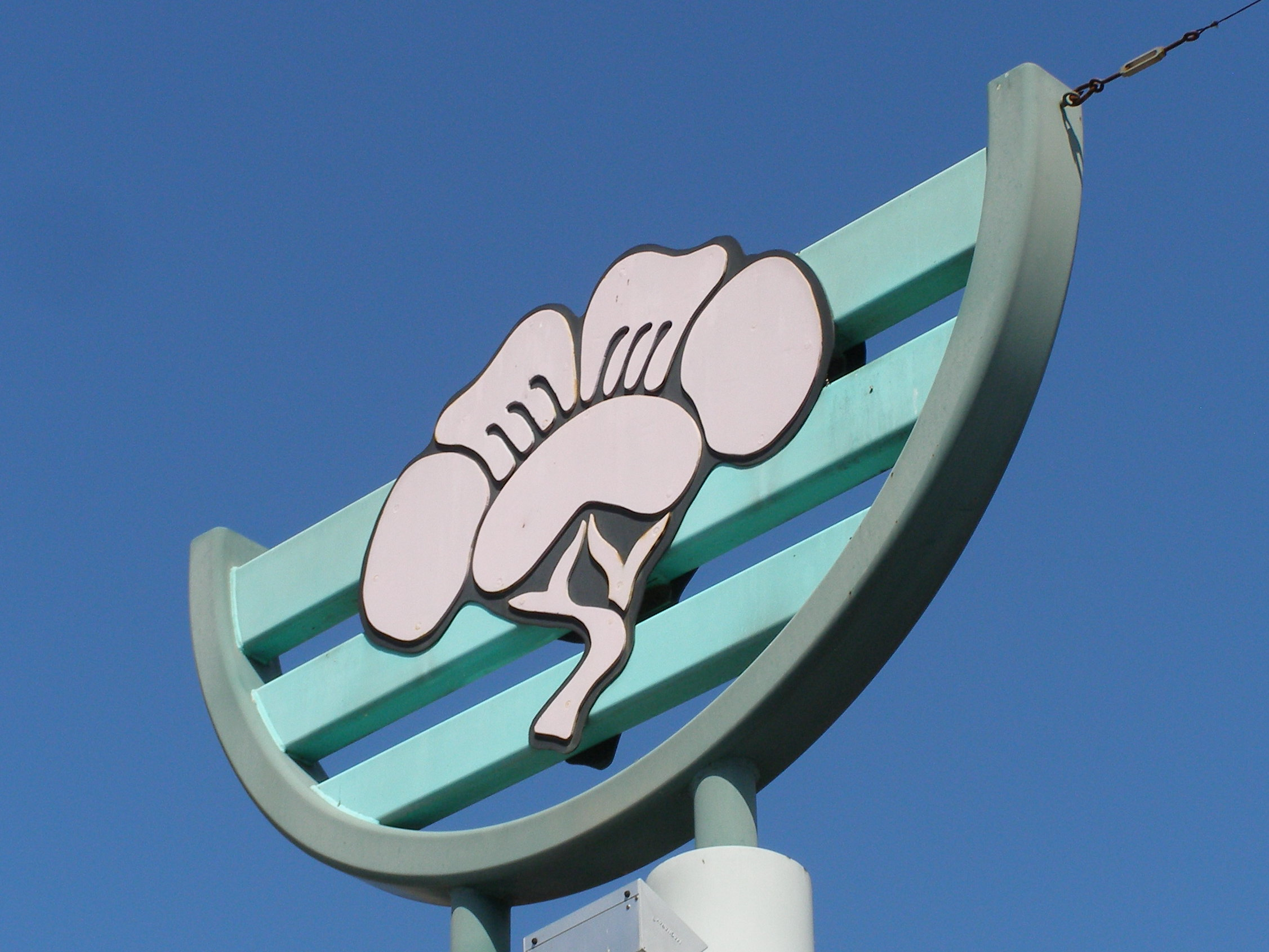
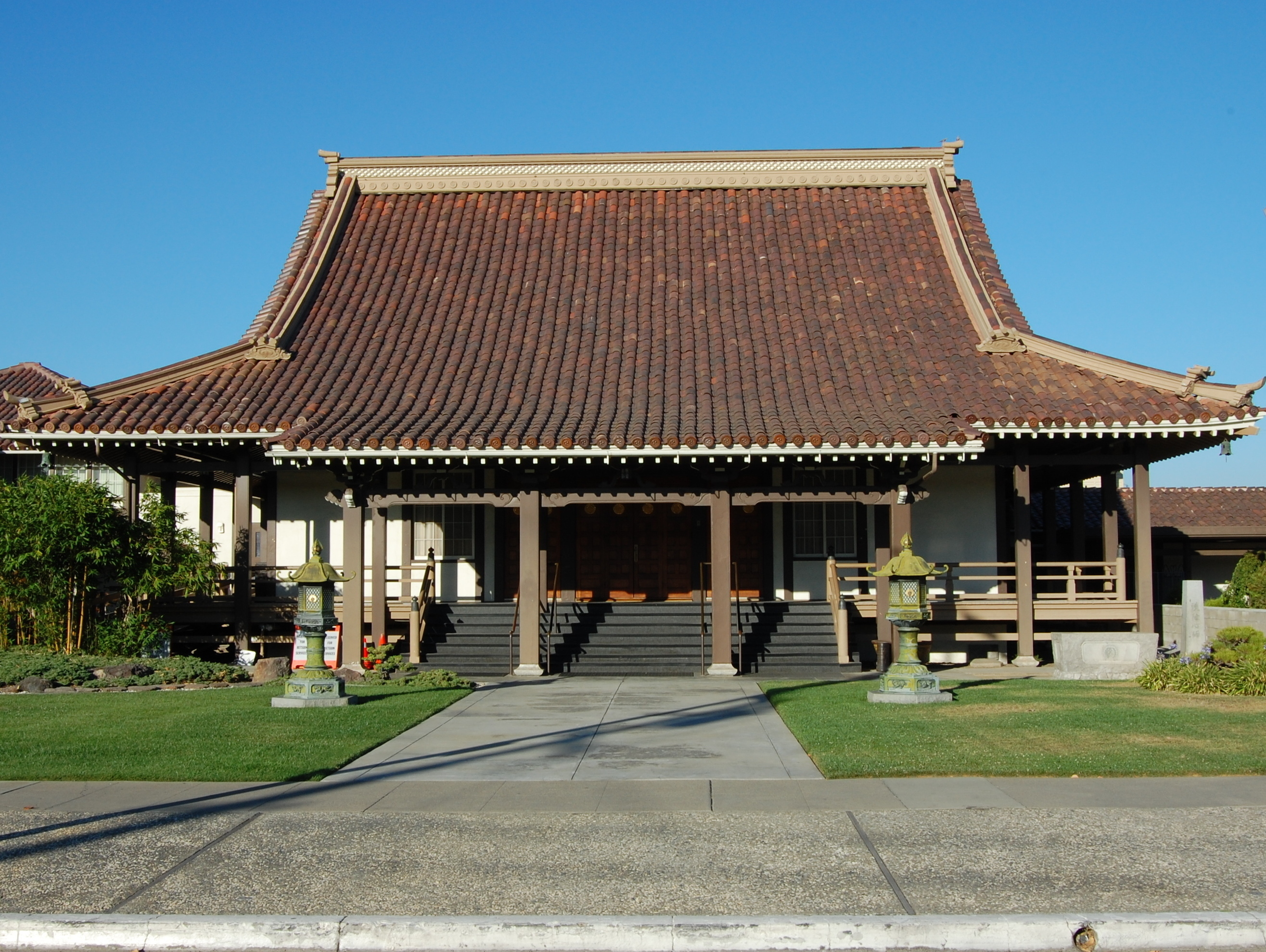
- Clockwise: San Jose Obon Festival; Gordon Biersch Brewery; Betsuin Buddhist Temple; Japantown blossom landmarks; Cannery Park.

- Location within San Jose, California
- Coordinates: 37.348463°N 121.895421°W
- Country: United States
- State: California
- County: Santa Clara
- City: San Jose
- ZIP Code: 95112
- Area code: Area code 408

Japantown (Japanese: 日本町; Nihonmachi), commonly known as J Town, is a historic cultural district of San Jose, California, north of Downtown San Jose. Historically a center for San Jose's Japanese American and Chinese American communities, San Jose's Japantown is one of only three Japantowns that still exist in the United States, alongside San Francisco's Japantown and Los Angeles's Little Tokyo.

== History ==
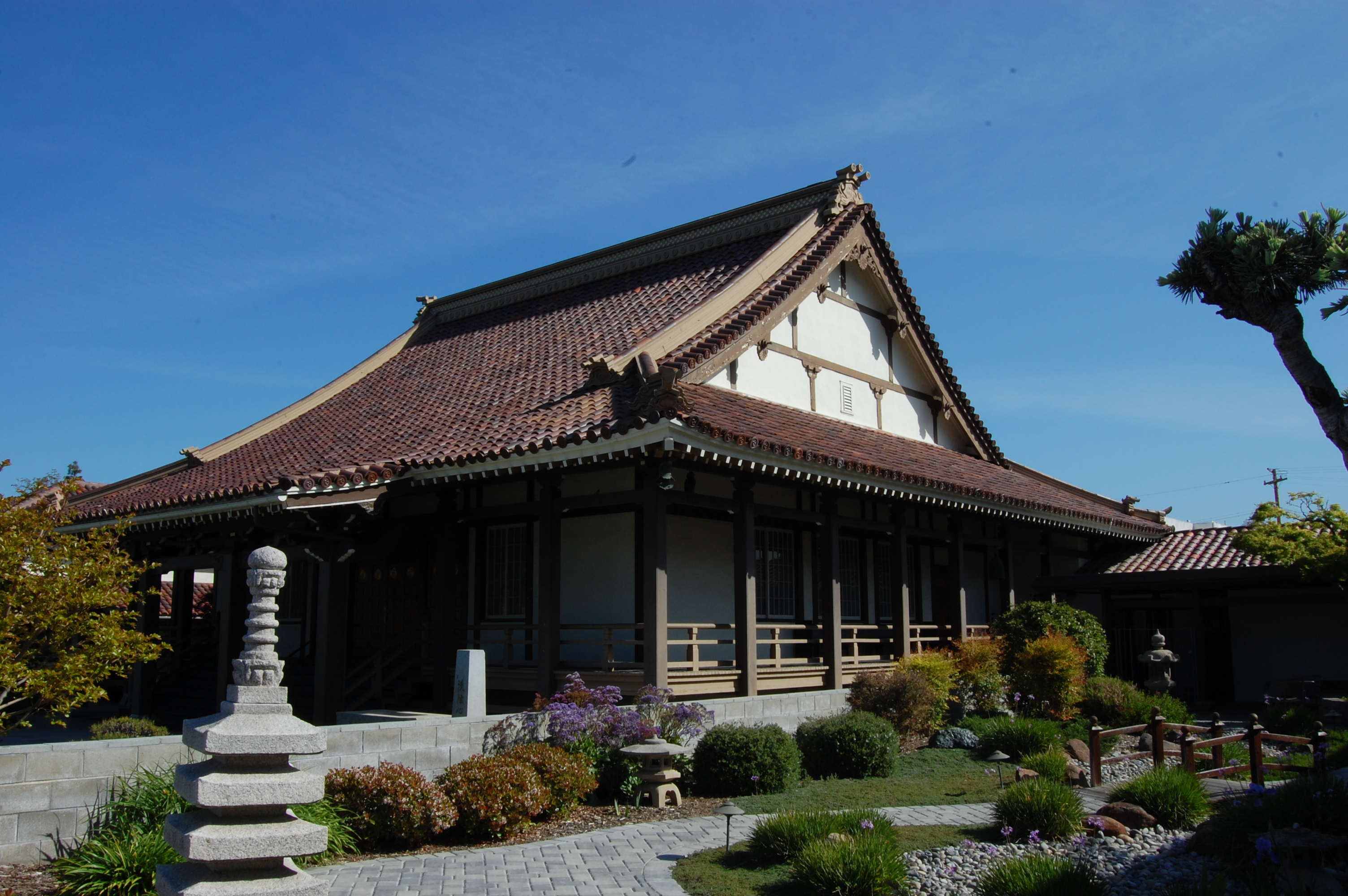
San Jose Betsuin Buddhist Temple.

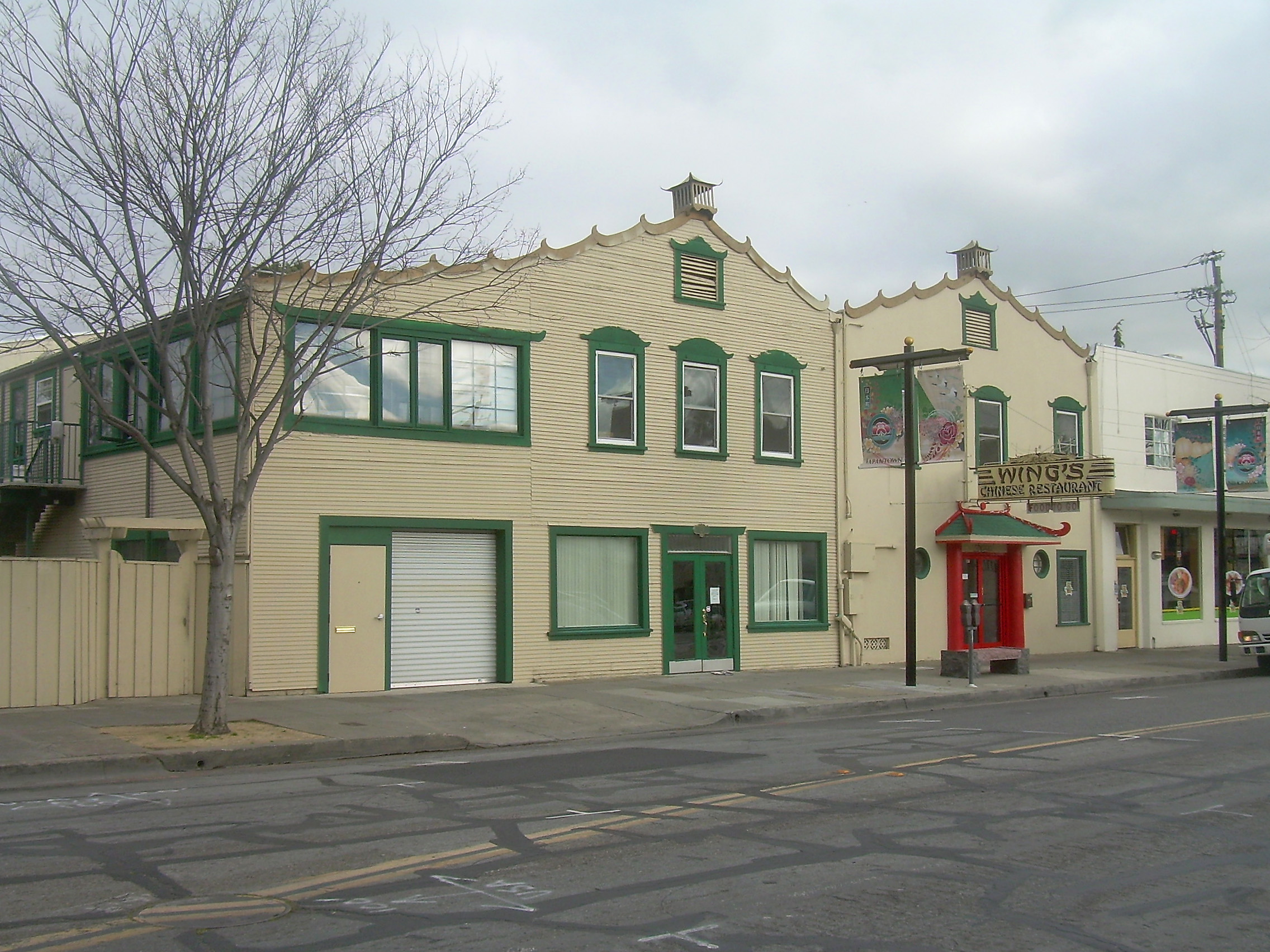
Until its closure in February 2019, Wing's Chinese Restaurant was San Jose's oldest operating restaurant.

Japantown originally formed as a site for boardinghouses for Japanese men, just west of the 1887 "Heinlenville" Chinatown settlement, which was the block bounded by Sixth, Seventh, Taylor, and Jackson Streets.

Initially the residents of Japantown were mostly male, attracted by farming or general labor jobs. In the early 20th century more women began to arrive as picture brides. As families began and grew, local businesses and organizations were established to serve everyday needs for food, clothing, and social activities. The local Japantown Asahi baseball club defeated the visiting Tokyo Giants in 1935.

By 1941 there were 53 businesses in Japantown. During World War II the Japanese American population was forcibly removed from Japantown and unjustly incarcerated in internment camps. Upon their return after the war, many resettled in the area.

The upward mobility of the children and grandchildren of the original immigrants to San Jose, along with the expansion and growth of Silicon Valley, caused many Japanese-Americans to leave the area for the suburbs, but the culture of this community remains in the businesses and festivals serving locals and tourists.

Japantown is home to many traditional Japanese restaurants. The California State Legislature mentioned this area as one of the last three remaining historical Japantowns in the United States.

In 2004 nearly 227,000 people resided within a 3-mile (4.8 km) radius of Japantown, of which 25% were of Asian descent.

== Japanese culture ==
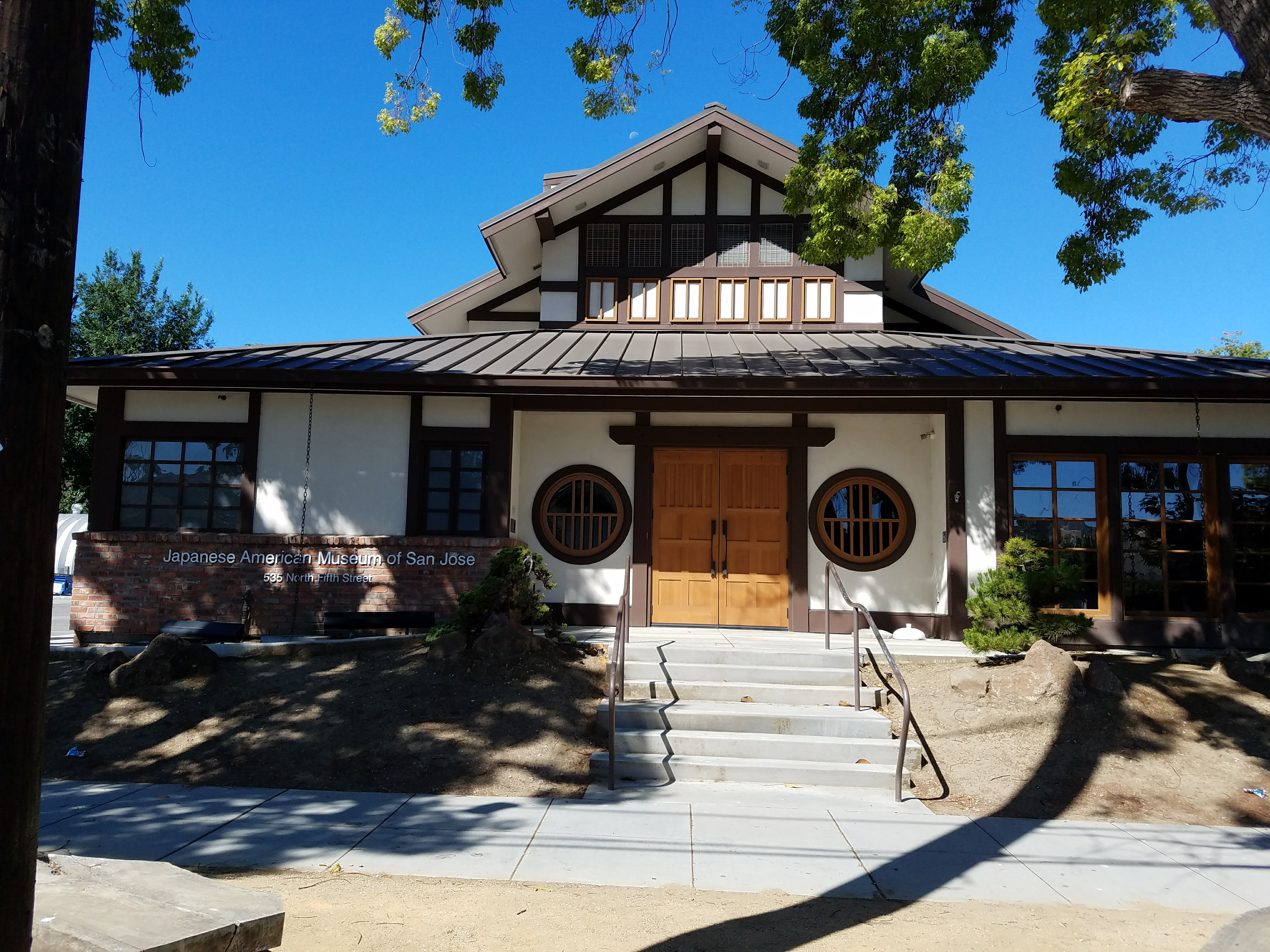
The Japanese American Museum.

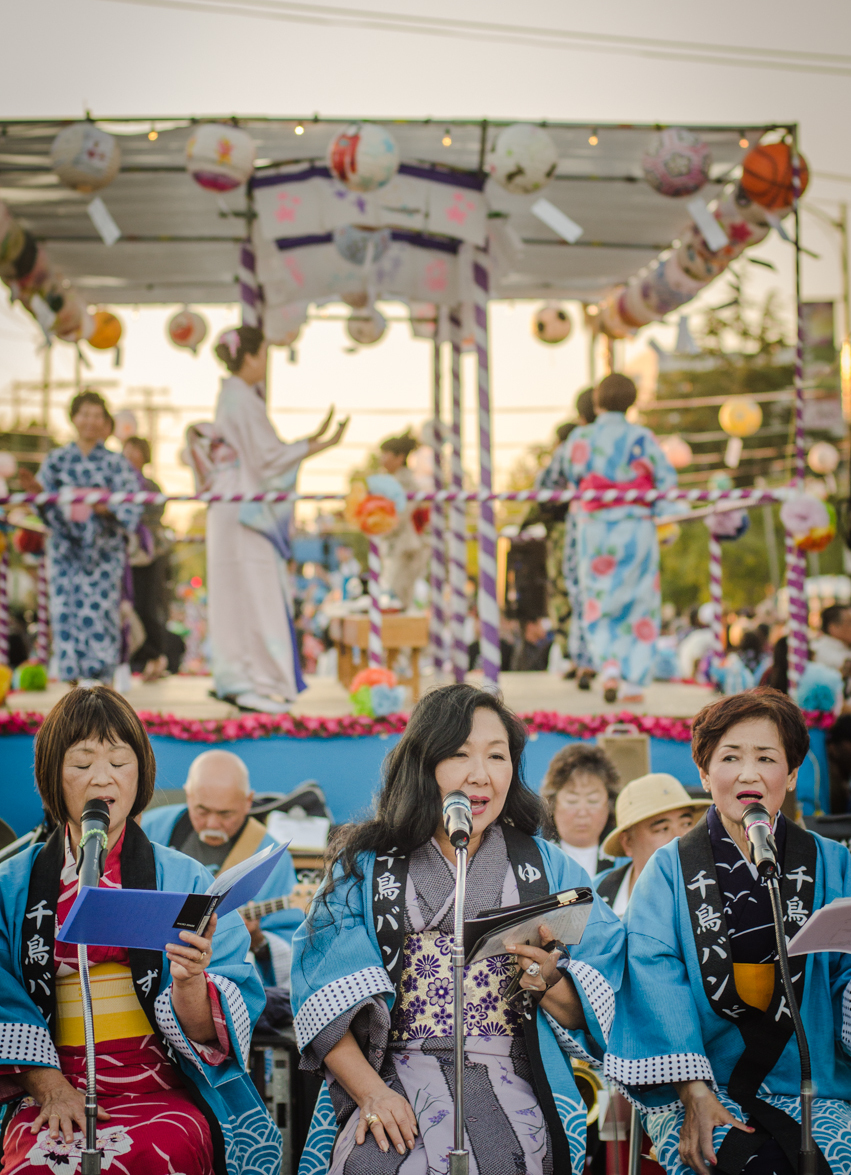
Performers at the San Jose Obon Festival, held annually in Japantown.

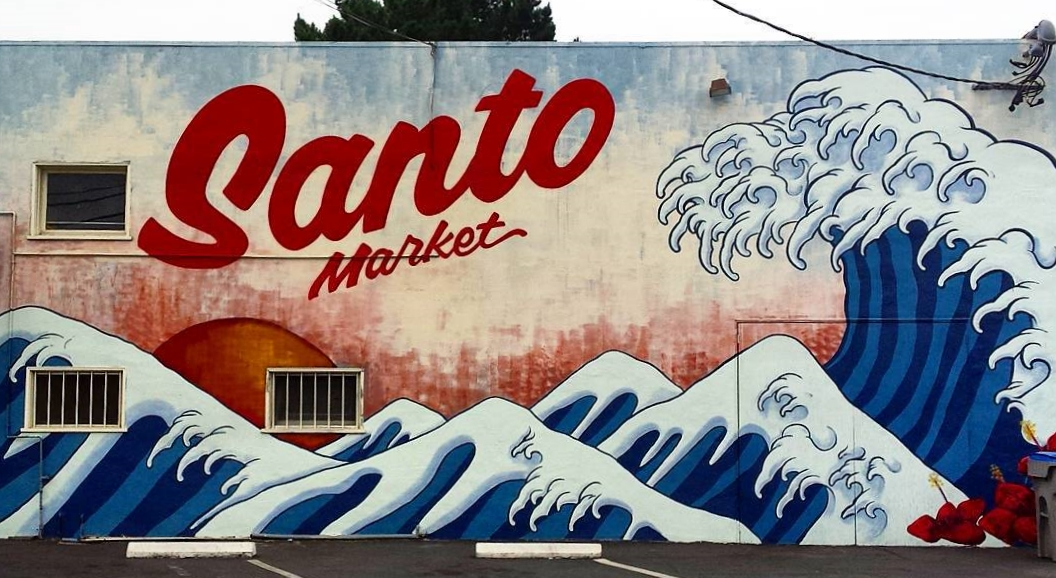
Santo Market mural inspired by The Great Wave off Kanagawa.

Japantown is the site of the Japanese American Museum of San Jose (which moved into a new building in 2010); San Jose Taiko; Shuei-do Manju Shop (whose manjū were specifically requested during the 1994 visit of the Emperor of Japan); Nichi Bei Bussan (founded in San Francisco in 1902 by the father of prominent local businessman Dave Tatsuno and relocated to San Jose after the Tatsunos were interned, transformed from a general merchant to an Asian goods gift shop); and a variety of restaurants, professional services, community organizations (for example, Yu-Ai Kai Senior Center and the Japanese American Citizens League), and small retail shops. Japantown had two hand-made tofu shops, the last of which closed in 2017.

Two churches founded by Japanese over 100 years ago, Wesley United Methodist Church and San Jose Buddhist Church Betsuin, thrive on the same street, Fifth Street. They are home to many local community organizations, including active Girl and Boy Scout organizations, and they host several of Japantown's largest cultural festivals.

Japantown's Fifth Street now also leads to the new San Jose City Hall. Indeed the Fifth and Jackson Landmark was designed to be seen from City Hall as a beacon and reminder of the people who have helped build the city. The Fifth and Jackson Landmark is part of a larger California Japantown Landmarks Project to create powerful and emotional permanent outdoor exhibits, including monuments in San Francisco and Los Angeles.

Japantown is also home to a number of non-Japanese businesses, including Mexican, Hawaiian, and Korean restaurants.

A number of organizations, including the Japantown Neighborhood Association, have joined to form the Japantown Community Congress of San Jose, which is a community partner to the City of San Jose (represented by the San Jose Redevelopment Agency) that looks after cultural preservation of the area (begun with CA SB 307).

Major festivals include Obon (every July), Nikkei Matsuri (every spring), and Aki Matsuri (every fall) and a newer festival, The Spirit of Japantown Festival (also in the fall). In addition there are events open to the public at Art Object Gallery and various street venues, including a year-round Certified Farmers Market run by the Japantown Business Association.

On March 22, 2021, the Japantown community formally started citizen foot patrols to increase security and prevent attacks on Asian Americans.

== Geography ==
Japantown is located in Central San Jose, just north of Downtown San Jose. It is surrounded by the Northside neighborhood to its south and east. To its north are the Hyde Park and Luna Park neighborhoods. To its west is the Santa Clara County Civic Center district.

== Transit ==
The Japantown area is served by VTA light rail Blue and Green lines at nearby Japantown/Ayer station.

== Parks and plazas ==
Parks within Japantown include:

- Bernal Park
- Cannery Park
- Heinlenville Park

Backesto Park is located nearby in the Northside neighborhood.

== Gallery ==
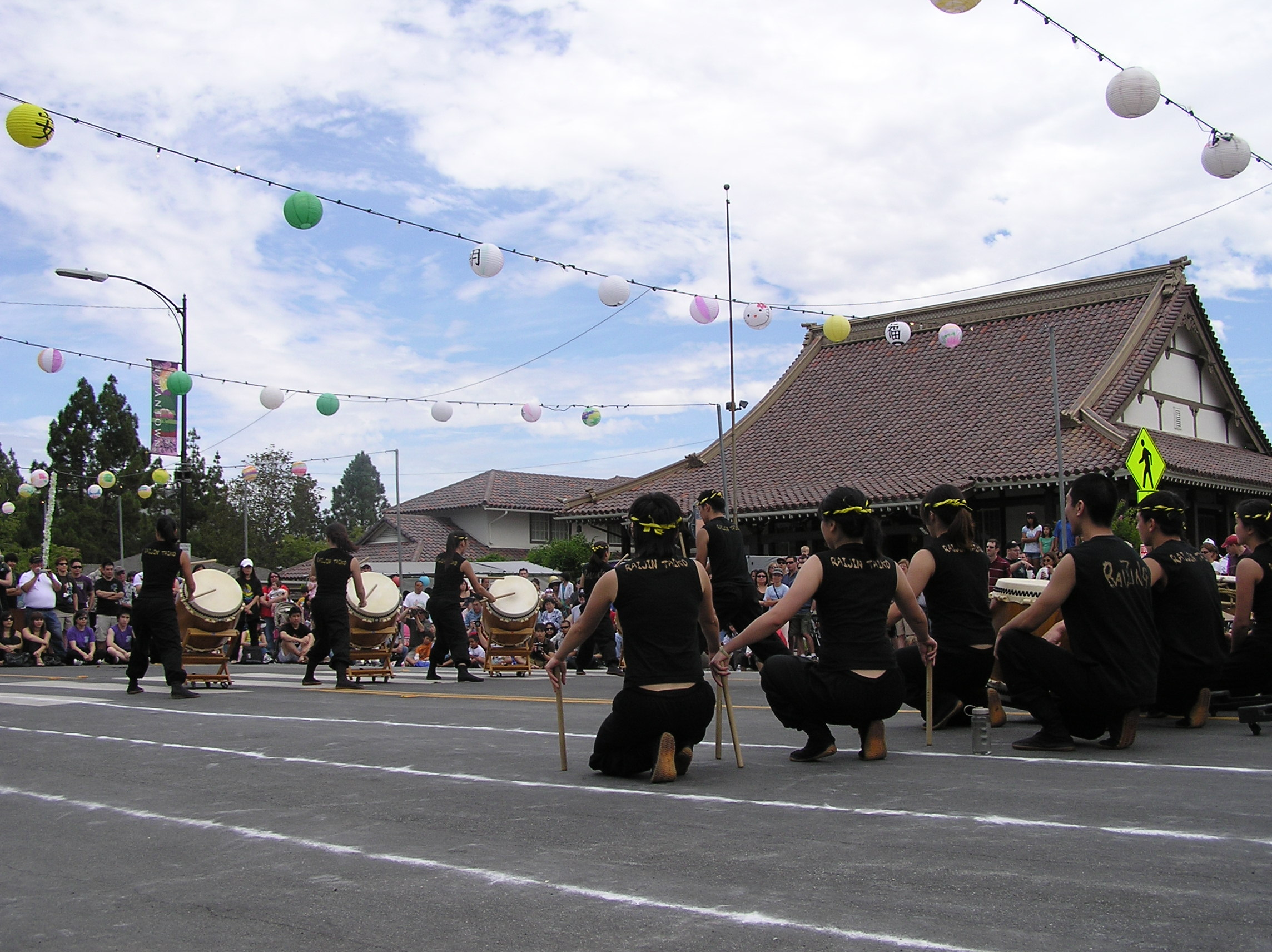
San Jose Obon Festival

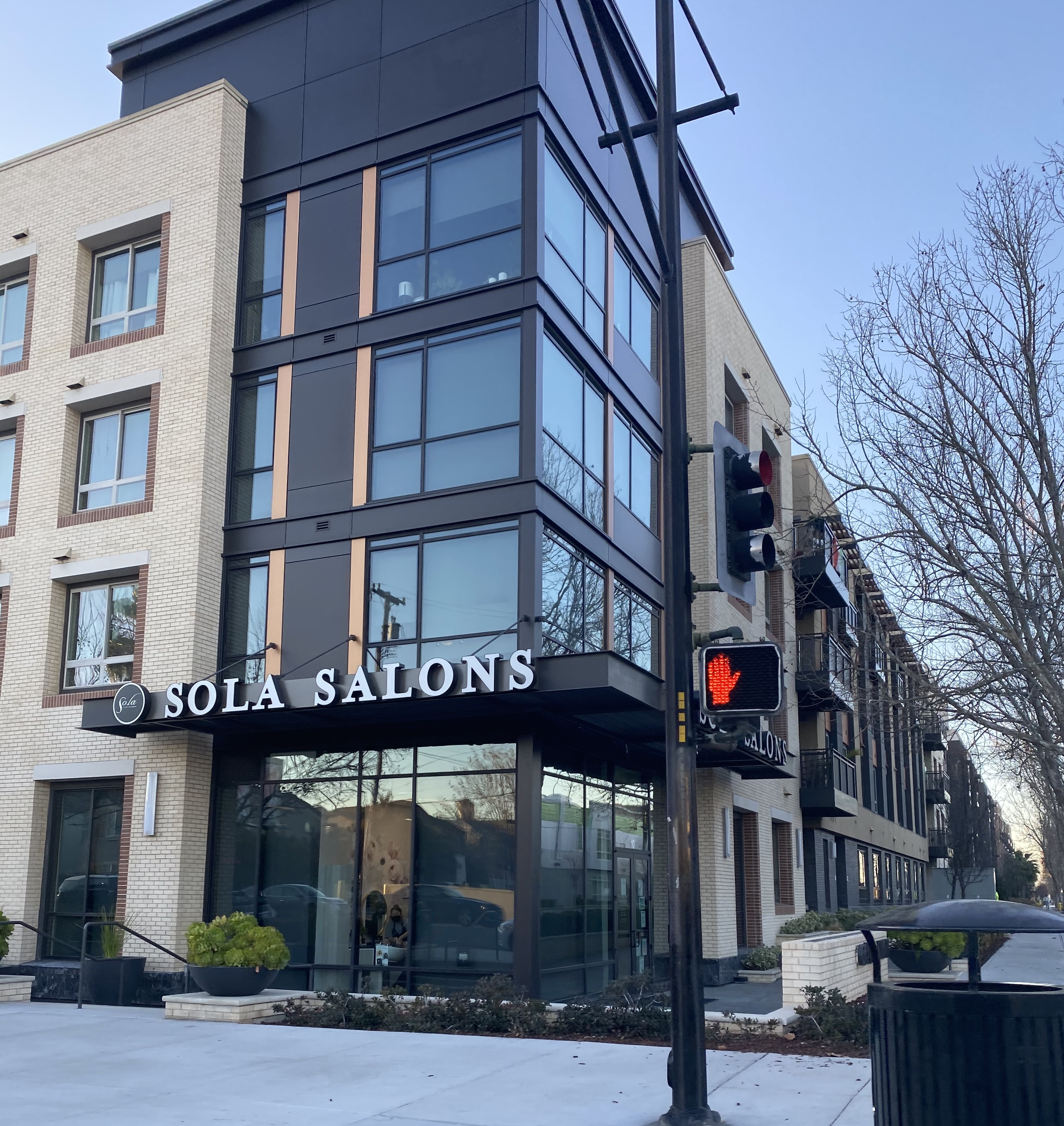
Taylor St. & 10th St.

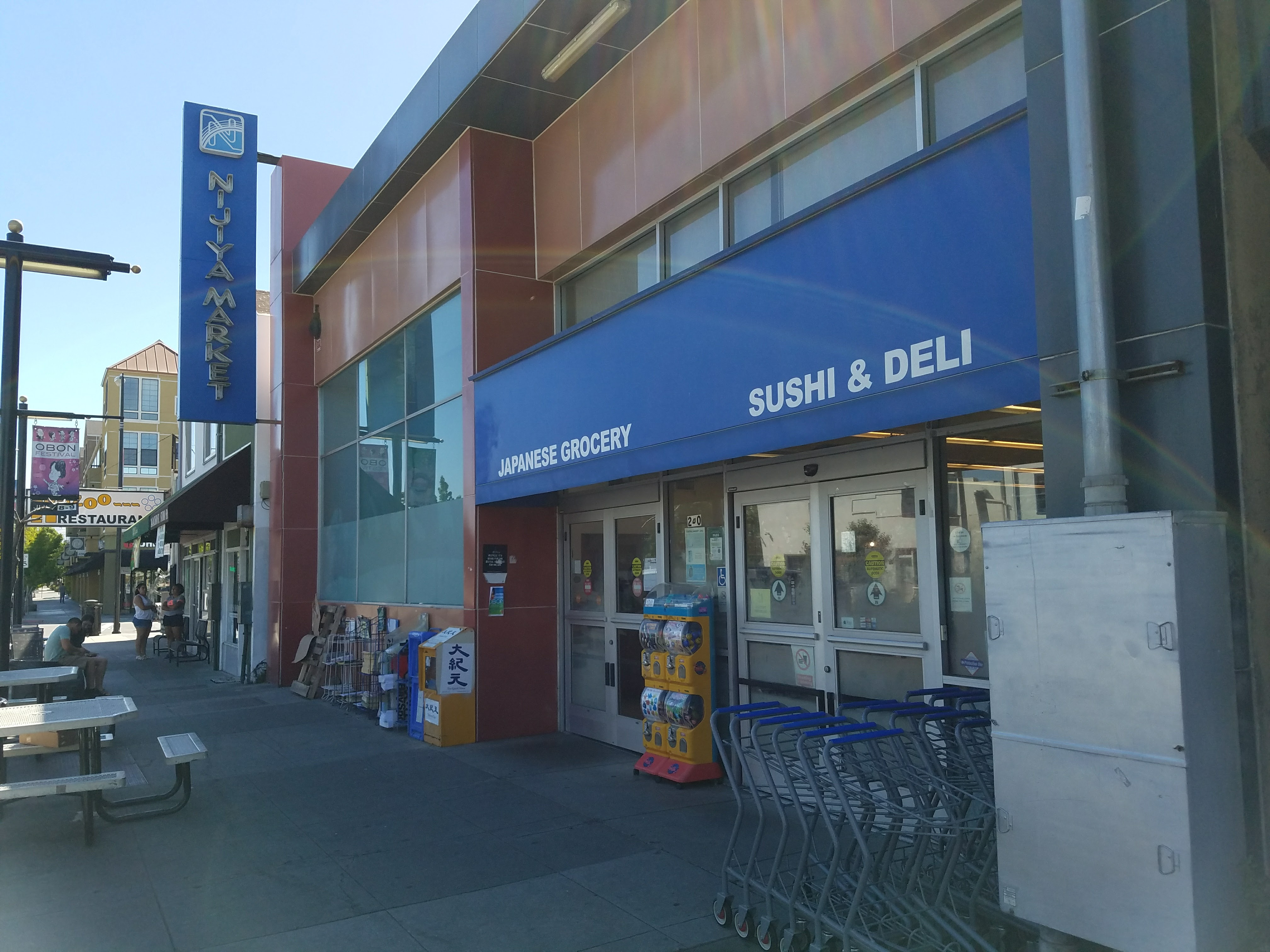
Nijiya Market

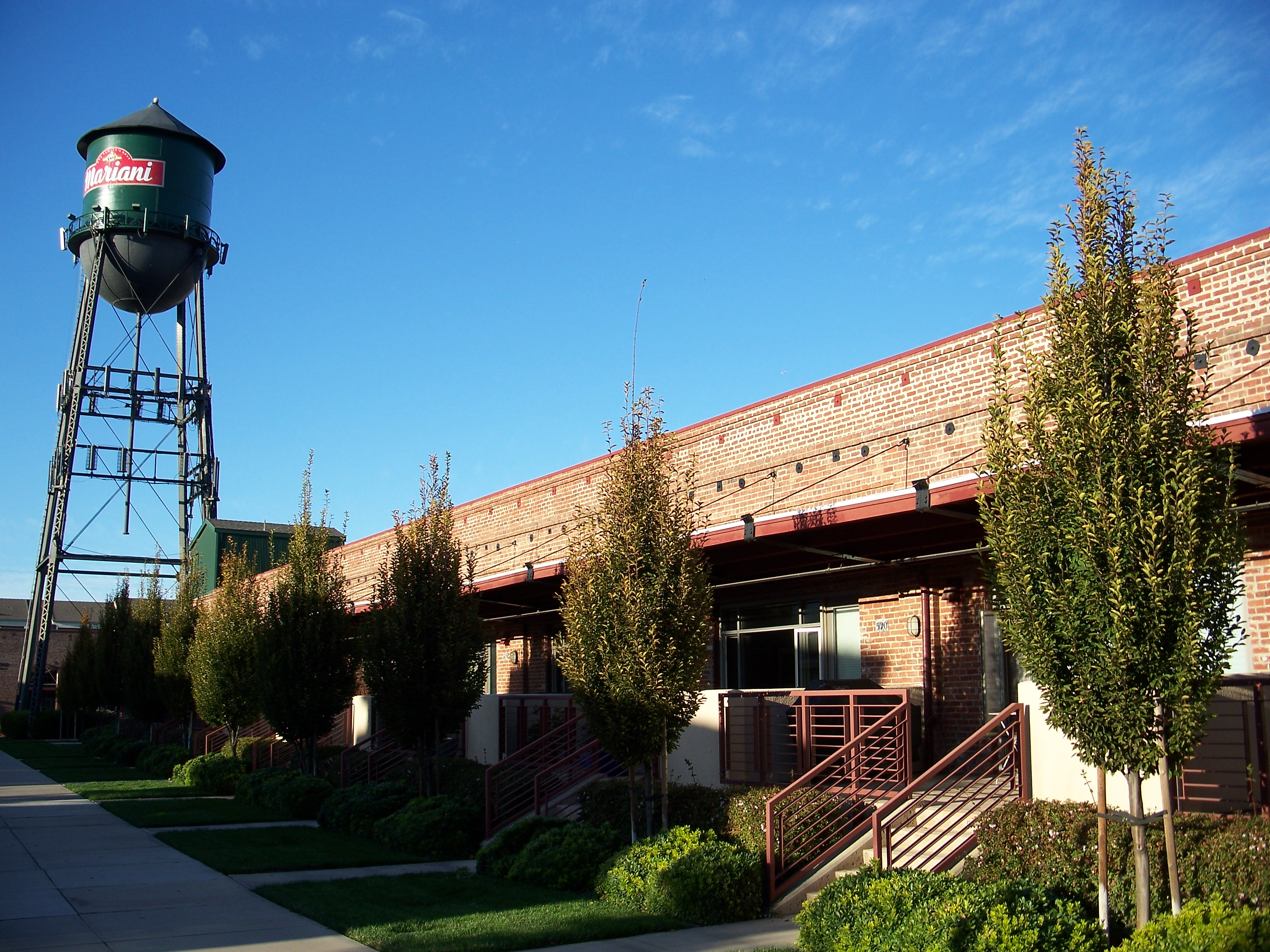
Historic Mariani cannery

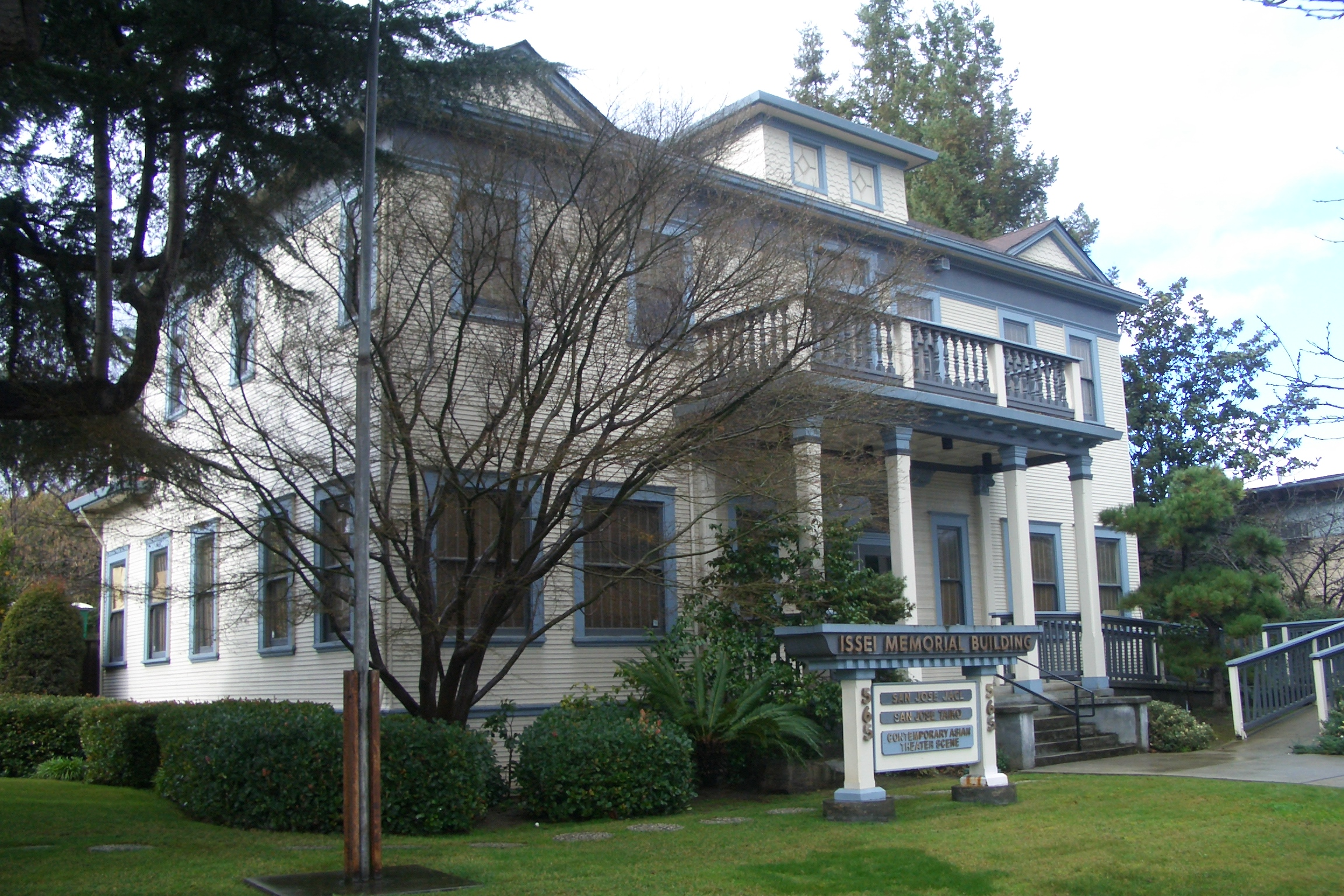
Issei Memorial Building

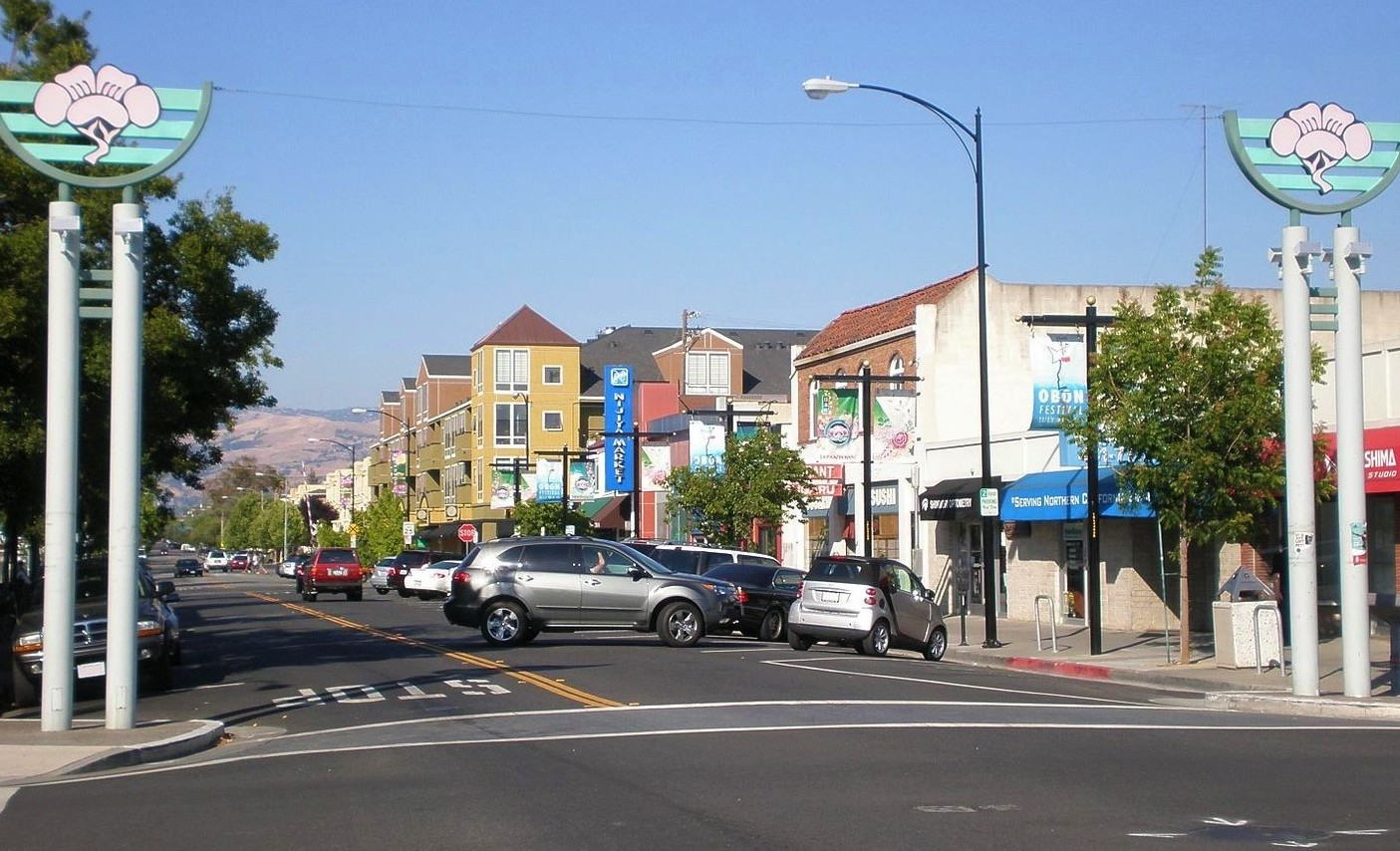
Jackson St. & 5th St.
