= Backesto Park =

Park in San Jose, California

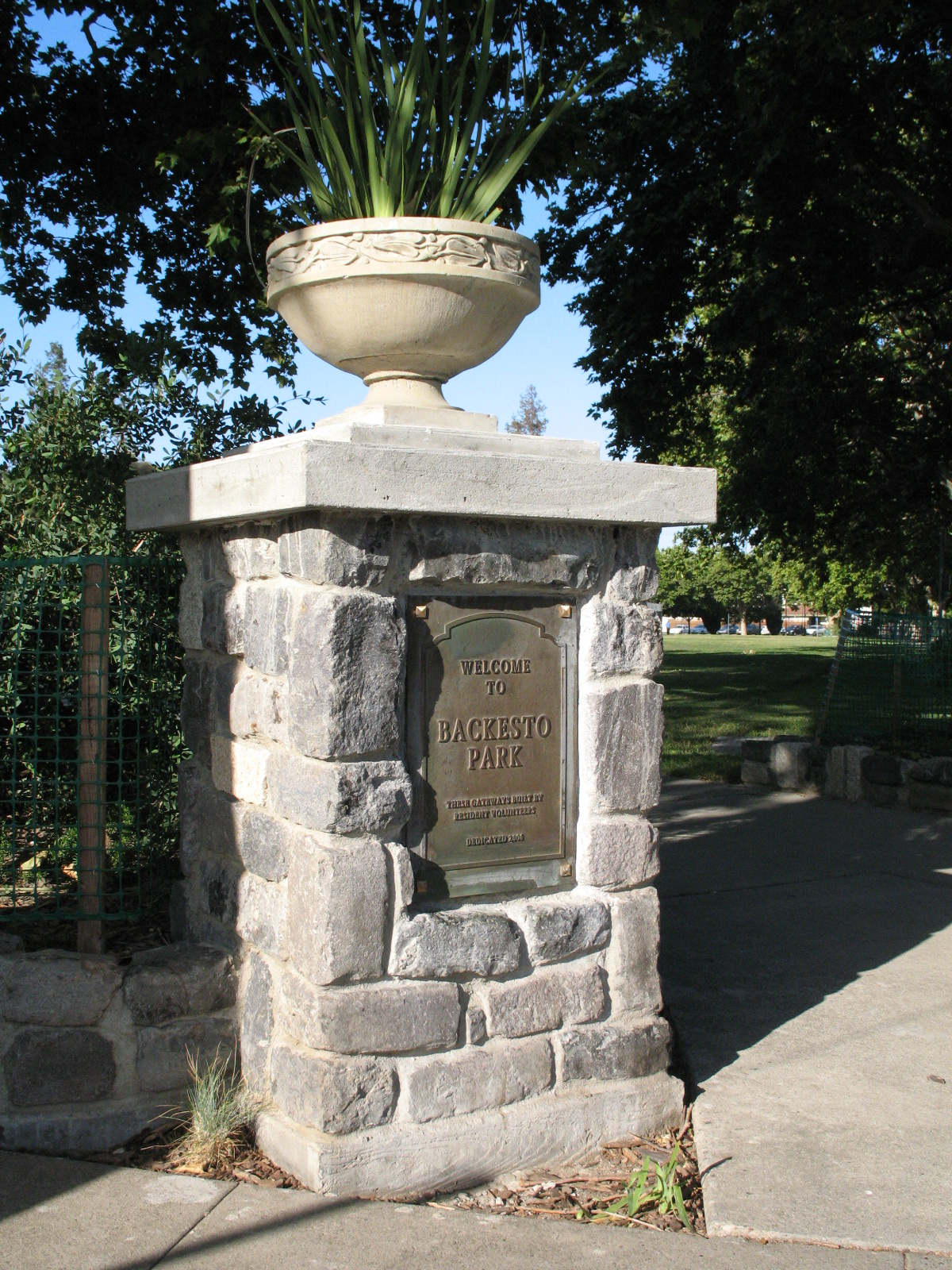
- Interactive map of Backesto Park
- Location: San Jose, California
- Coordinates: 37.3523°N 121.8845°W
- Area: 10.5 acres (4.2 ha)

Backesto Park is a park in San Jose, California, in the Northside neighborhood.

== History ==
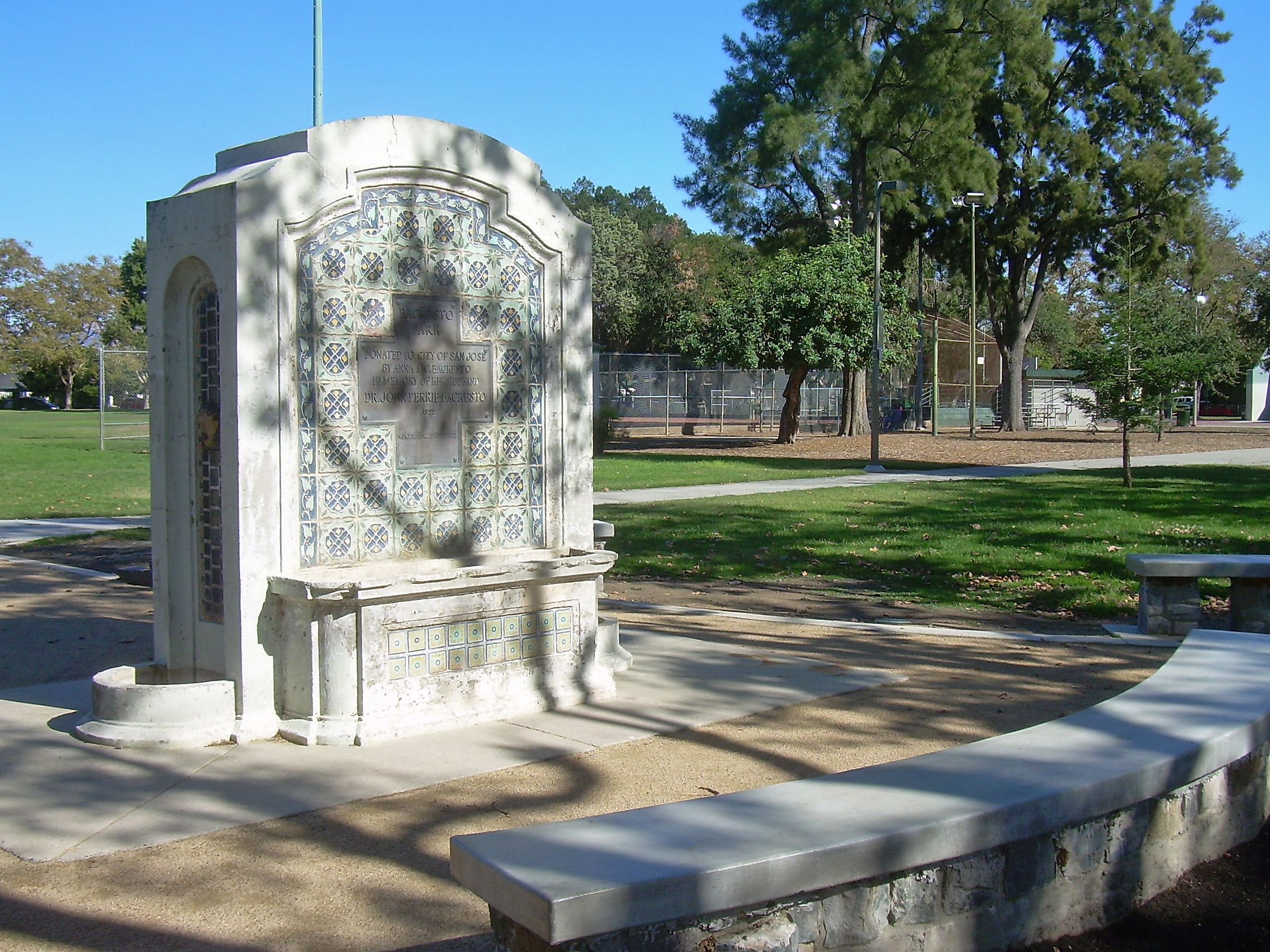
The Backesto Park Fountain, the oldest Solon and Schemmel Tile Company structure in existence.

Backesto Park is named after John Pierre Backesto (1831-1890), a prominent San Jose physician in 1800s.

In 1890, after John Pierre's death, his widow, Anne Backesto, donated $30,000 to San Jose in order to found a park in his memory.

Backesto Park is home to a tiled memorial fountain to the Backesto family, installed in 1922, which is the oldest structure still in existence made by the Solon and Schemmel Tile Company, the famed Californian tile producer.

In 2017, the park's tennis courts were renamed in honor of Don Johnson, a San Jose community leader and tennis coach.

== Location ==
Backesto Park is located in the Northside neighborhood.

It is also nearby to Japantown.
