= Northside, San Jose =

Northside
- Neighborhood of San Jose
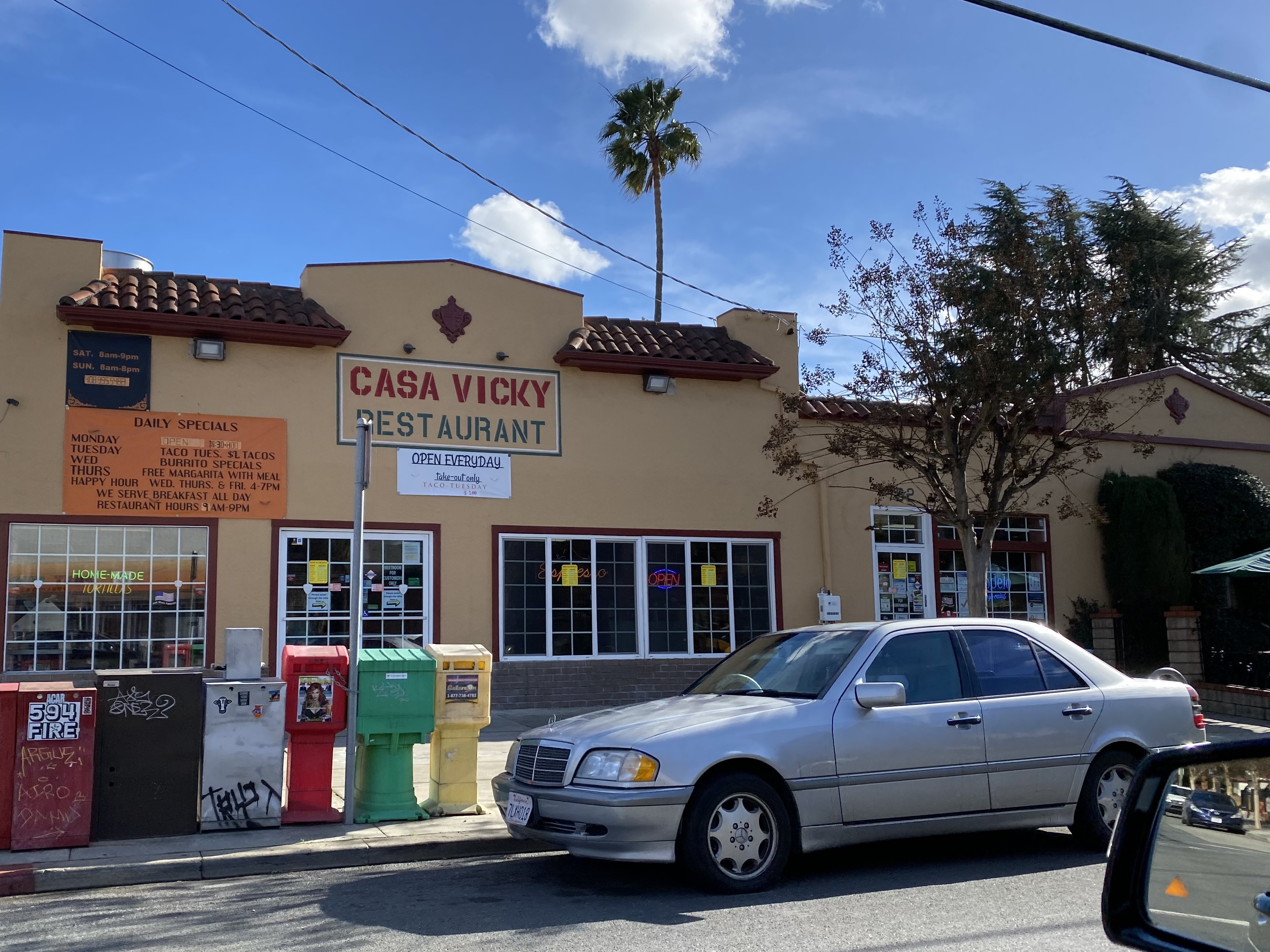
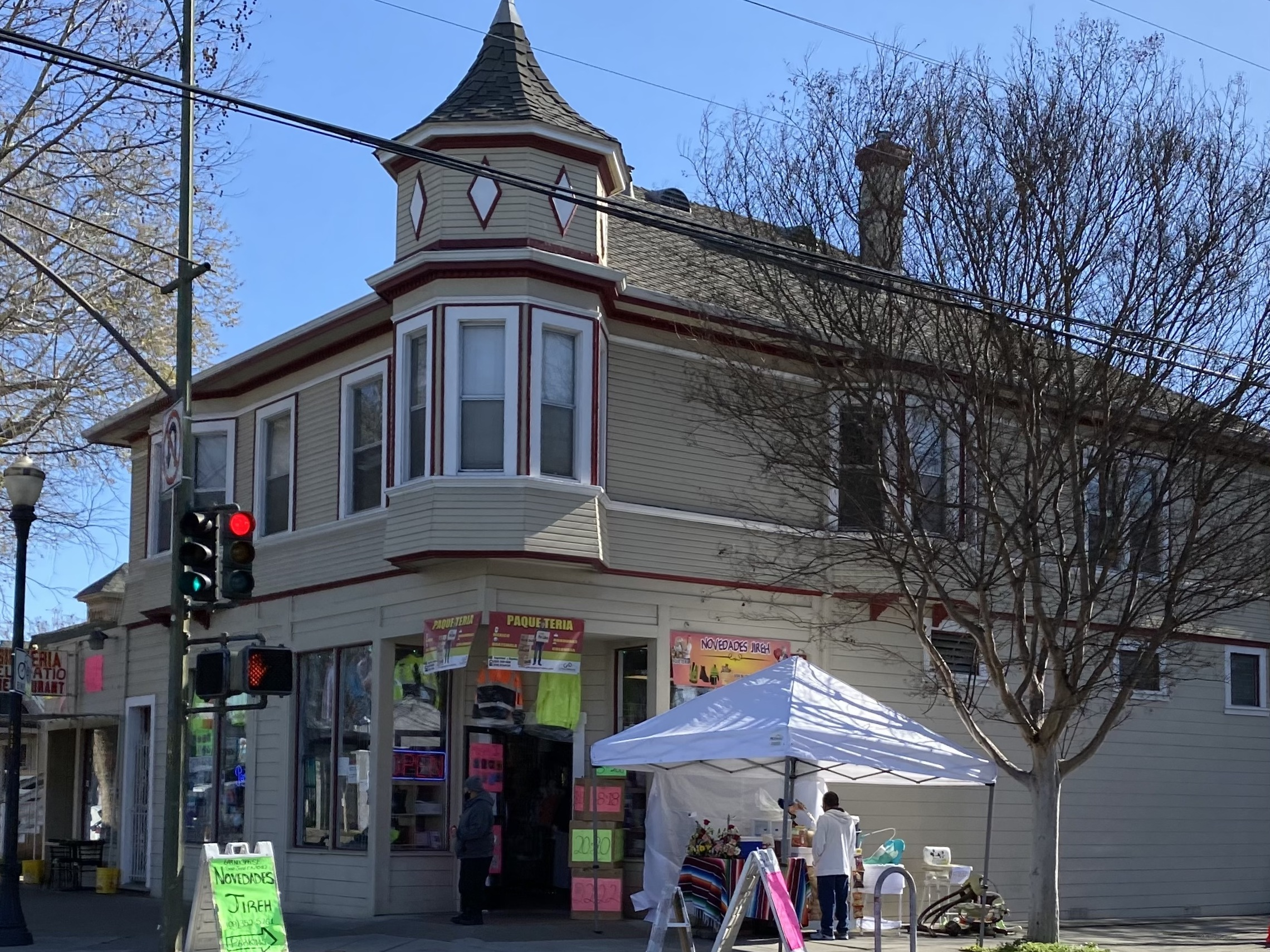
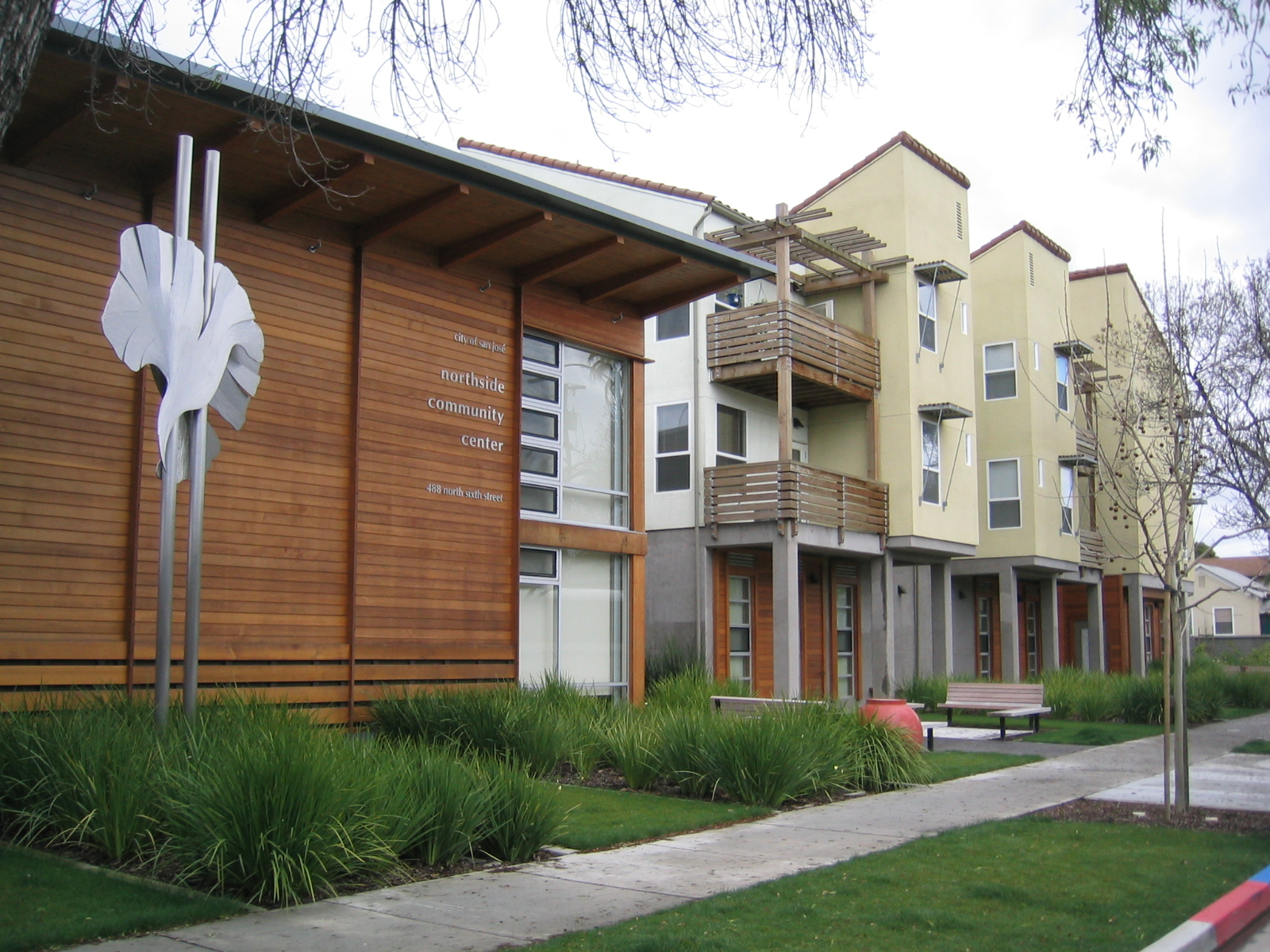
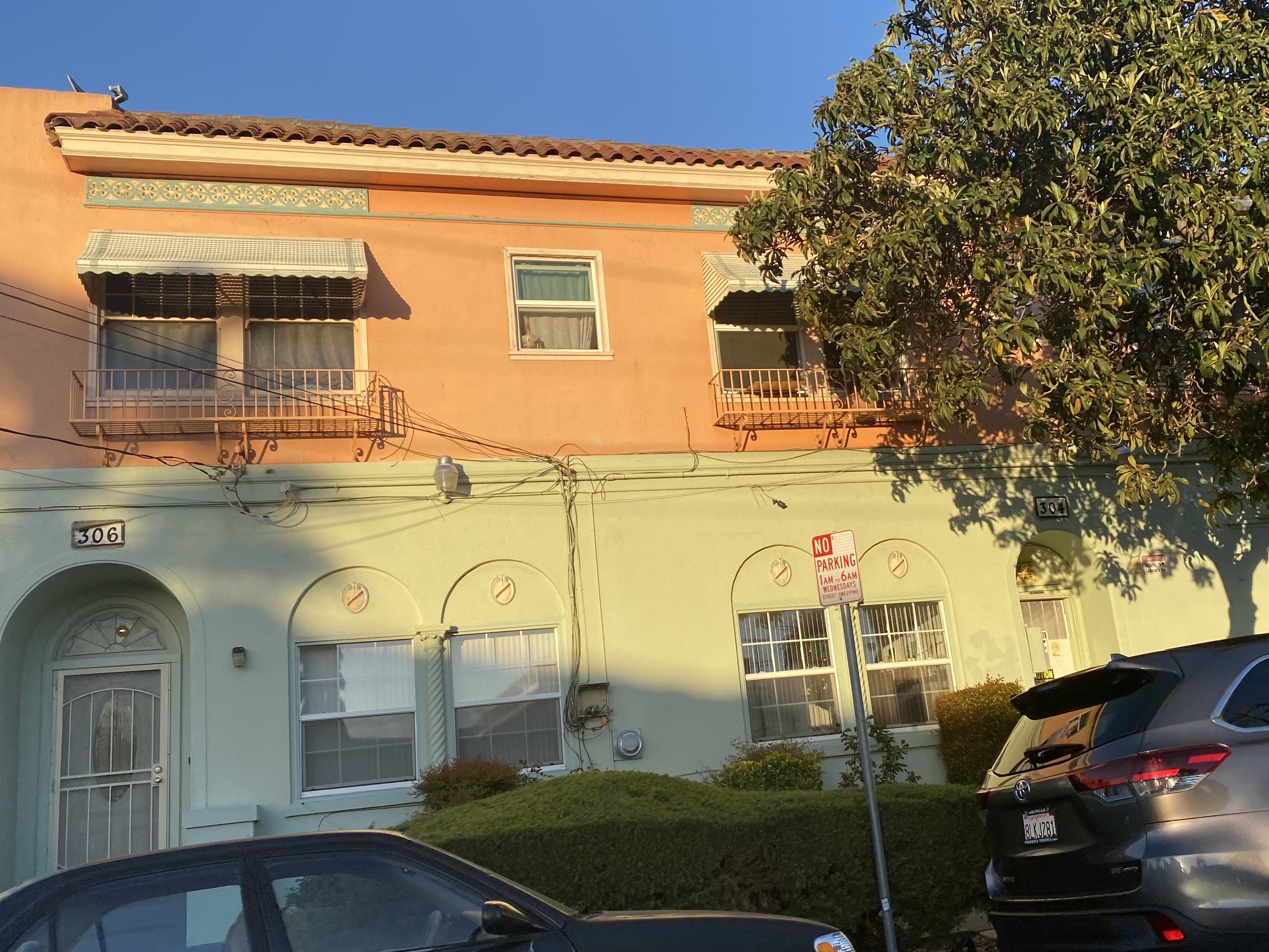
- Top: Casa Vicky; a bodega on Taylor St.; bottom: Northside Community Center; Joyce Ellington Branch of the San José Public Library.

- Location within San Jose
- Coordinates: 37.351998°N 121.884291°W
- Country: United States
- State: California
- City: San Jose

Northside is a historic neighborhood of Central San Jose, California, immediately north of Downtown San Jose. It borders Japantown to its west.

== History ==
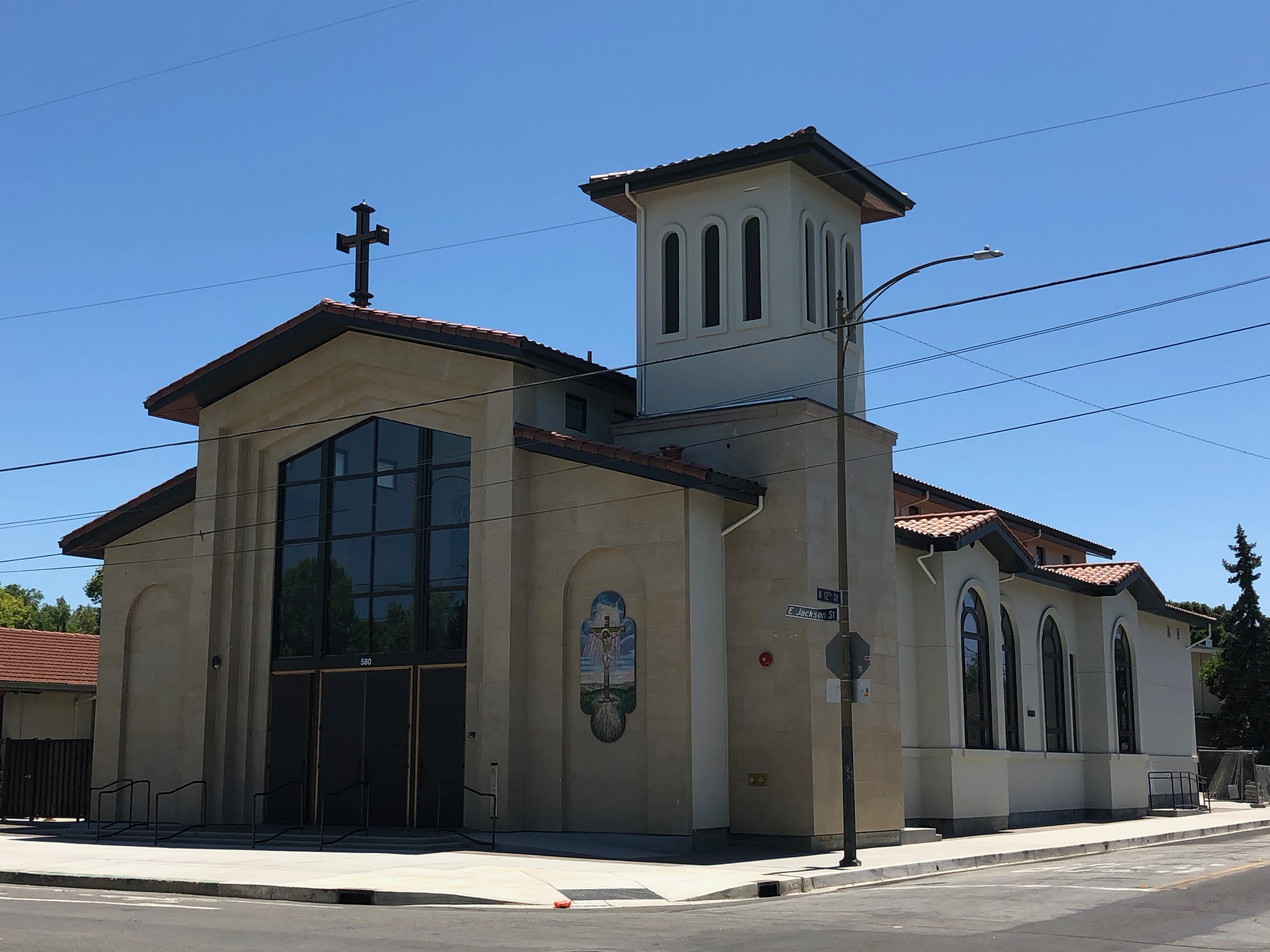
Holy Cross Church was originally founded in 1906.

Northside is a historic turn-of-the-century neighborhood, made up of various styles, especially Spanish Colonial Revival and Queen Anne style architecture.

Backesto Park was laid out in 1890, dedicated in honor of J. Pierre Backesto. The Backesto Park Fountain is a tiled memorial fountain to the Backesto family, installed in 1922, which is the oldest structure still in existence made by the Solon and Schemmel Tile Company, a famed Californian tile producer.

Holy Cross Church was originally founded in 1906 as a missionary chapel, until the first church was built in 1919 in a Spanish Colonial Revival style. The first church was destroyed in a fire in 2014 and subsequently rebuilt in 2018.

The Northside Neighborhood Association, founded in 1965, is the oldest neighborhood association in the city.

== Geography ==
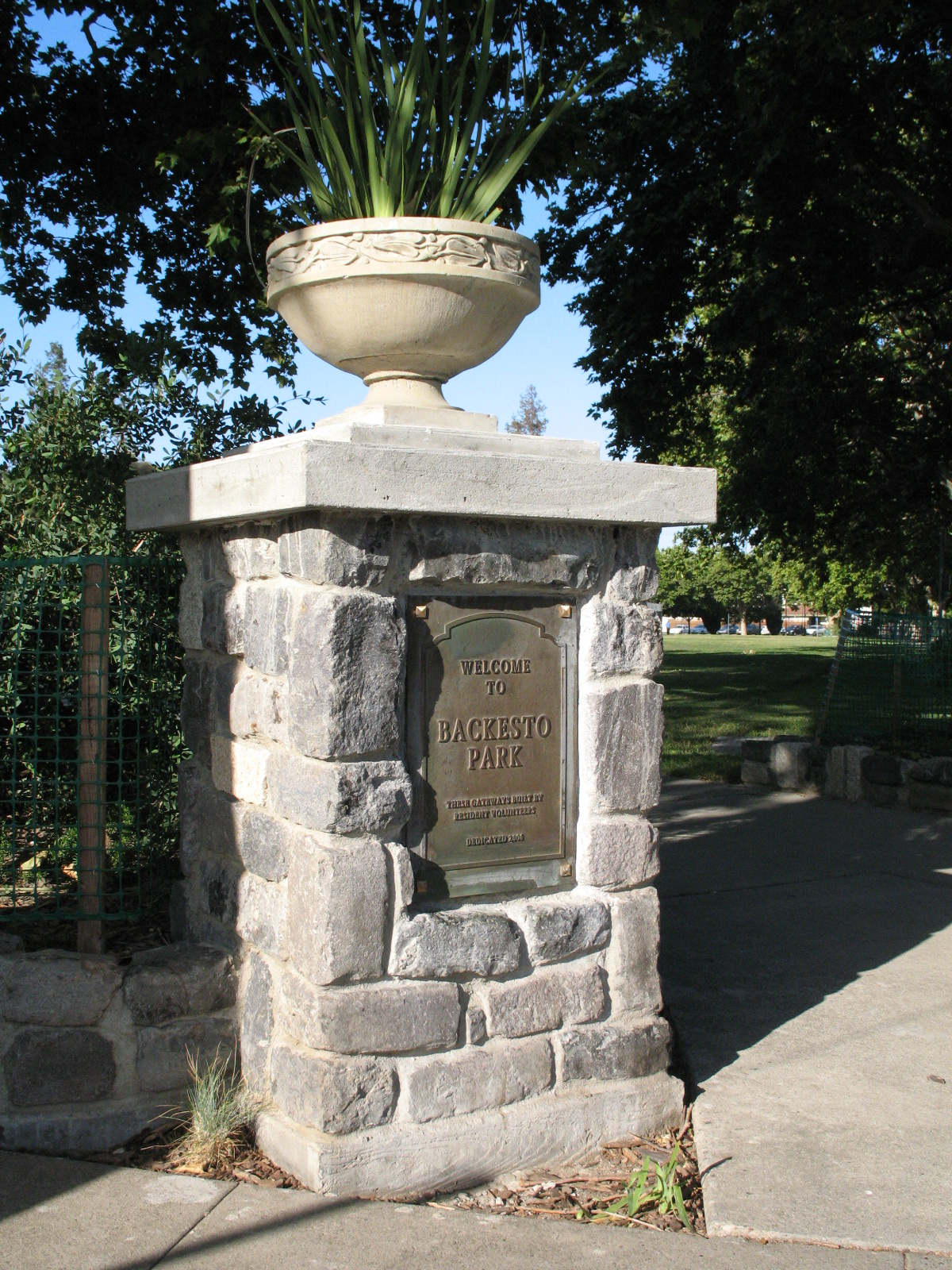
Historic Backesto Park.

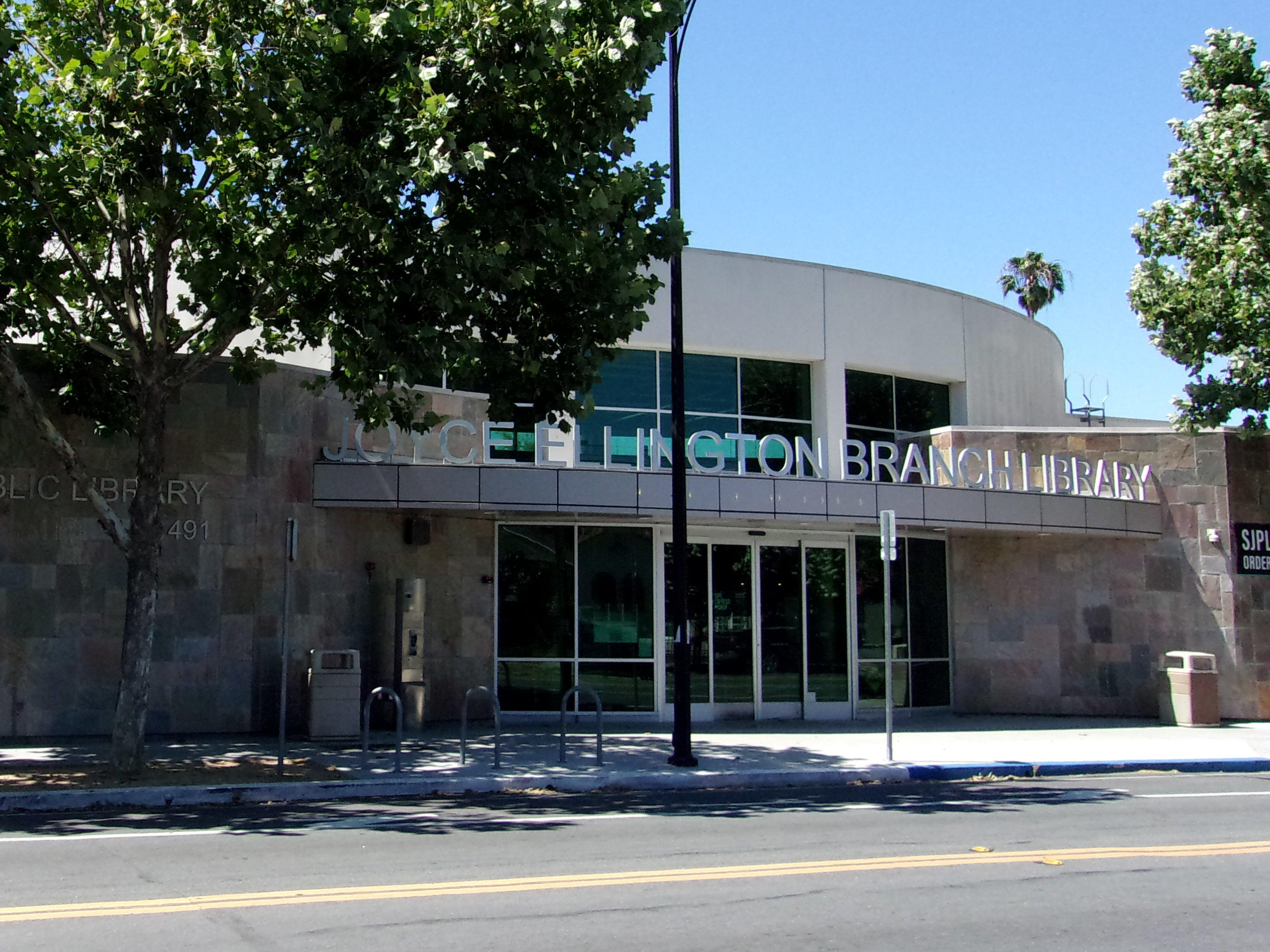
Joyce Ellington Branch of the San José Public Library.

Northside is located in Central San Jose, immediately north of Downtown San Jose. It is bordered by Japantown to the west.

== Parks and plazas ==
- Backesto Park
- Watson Park

== Landmarks ==
- Holy Cross Church
- Northside Community Center
