= Minns =

Minns is a surname. Notable people with the surname include:

- Al Minns (1920–1985), American Lindy Hop and jazz dancer
- Allan Glaisyer Minns (1858–1930), medical doctor, the first black mayor in Britain
- Allan Noel Minns, DSO, MC, (1891–1921), English medical doctor of African-Caribbean descent, officer in the British Army during WW1
- Benjamin Edwin Minns (1863–1937), Australian artist, one of Australia's foremost watercolourists
- Chris Minns (born 1979), Australian politician, 47th Premier of New South Wales
- Ellis Minns, FBA (1874–1953), British academic and archaeologist whose studies focused on Eastern Europe
- George W. Minns (1813–1895), American lawyer and educator
- Julie Minns (born 1968), British politician, MP for Carlisle
- Latario Collie-Minns (born 1994), Bahamian triple jumper
- Lathone Collie-Minns (born 1994), Bahamian triple jumper
- Martyn Minns (born 1943), English-born American bishop in the Anglican Church of Nigeria
- Robert Minns (born 1940), English former cricketer
- Susan Minns (1839–1938), American biologist, philanthropist and collector
- Thomas Minns (born 1994), English professional rugby league footballer
- Ricky Minns ("Ruddy Muddy"), graffiti artist who works by selectively wiping dirt off dirty vans

== See also ==
- Allt jag inte minns (Swedish for Everything I Don't Remember), a 2015 novel by Swedish author Jonas Hassen Khemiri
- Minns du den stad (Swedish for Remember the City), a 1964 novel by Swedish author Per Anders Fogelström
- Minse
- Minsi (disambiguation)
- Minz
- Munns
