= List of presidents of San Jose State University =

President of San José State University

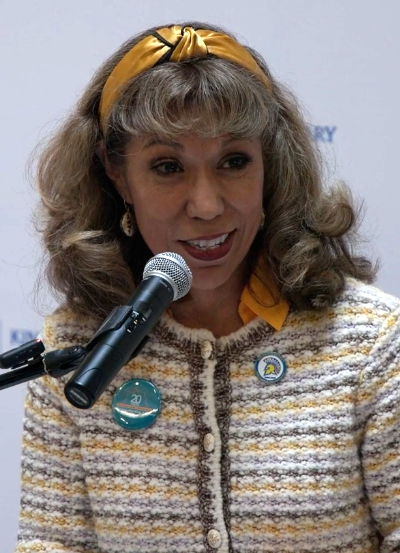
- Incumbent; Cynthia Teniente-Matson since January 15, 2023
- San José State University
- First holder: George W. Minns
- Salary: $474,840
- Website: Office of the President

The President of San José State University is the chief administrator of the university.

San José State University is a public university in San Jose, California. Established in 1857 and originally known as the Minns' Evening Normal School, SJSU is the oldest public university in the state of California. The university offers bachelor's, master's and doctoral degrees through its 7 colleges and schools. With a total student enrollment of about 36,000, SJSU is one of the largest universities in the United States.

Thirty-two people have led San Jose State since its founding including eight principals, 15 presidents, five acting presidents, and four interim presidents. The longest-serving president of the university was Thomas William MacQuarrie, who held the office for twenty five years from 1927 to 1952. The shortest-serving president of the university was Paul Yu who held the office for two weeks between July and August 2004.

The current president of San José State University is Cynthia Teniente-Matson, assuming the position on January 16, 2023.

== List of presidents ==
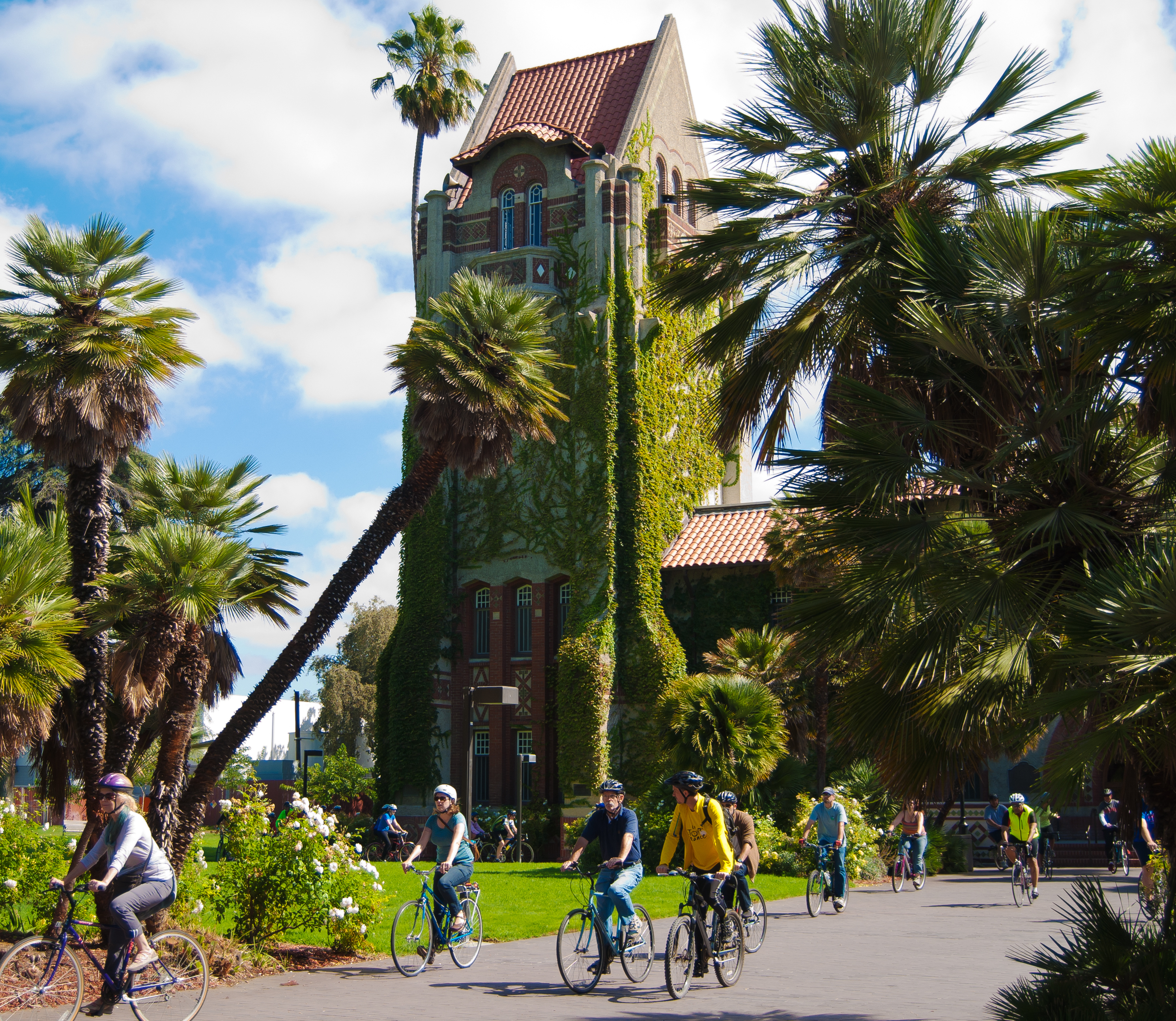
Tower Hall, location of the university president's office from 1910 to 2022.

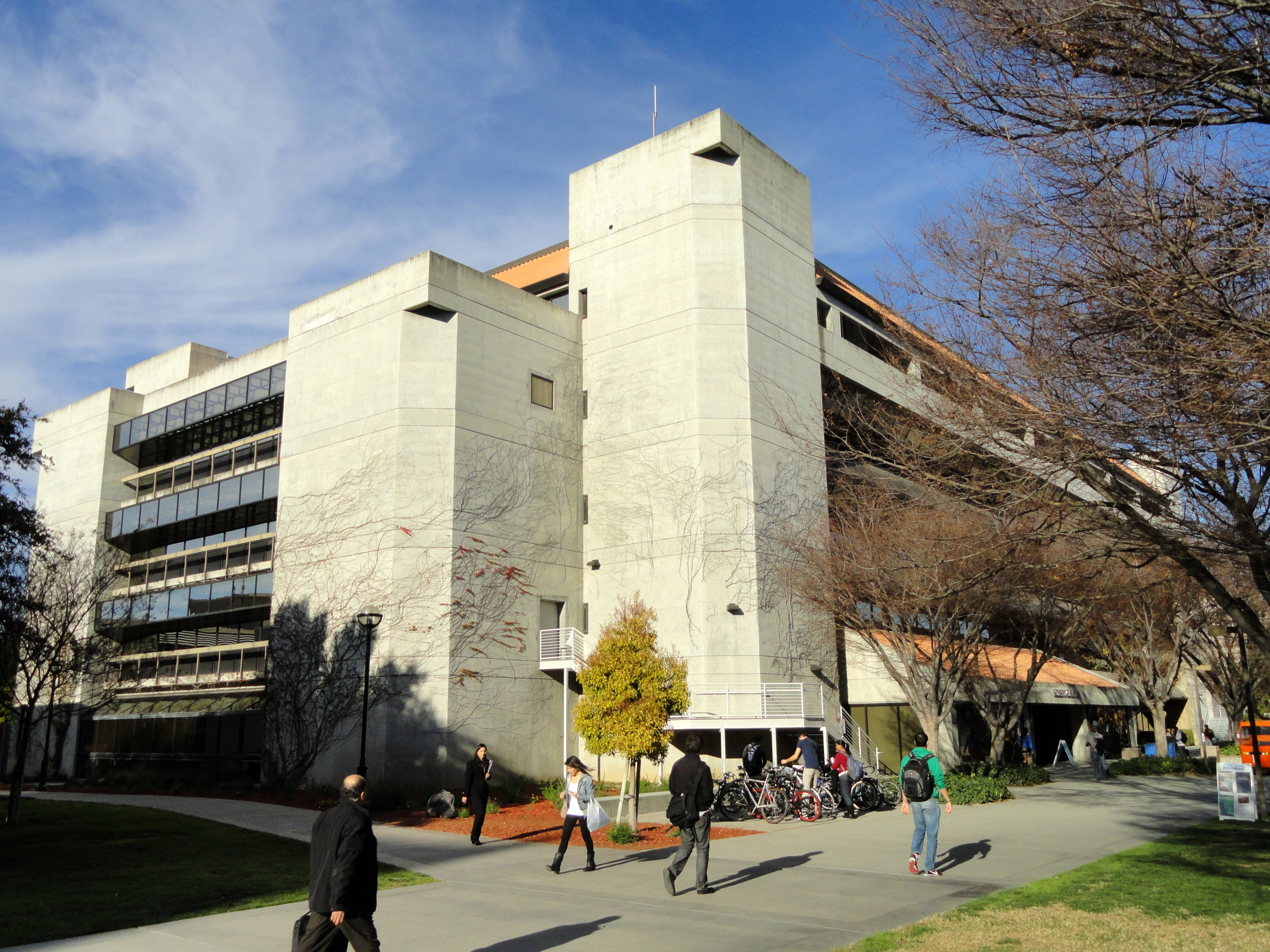
Robert D. Clark Hall, location of the university president's office since 2022.

The following individuals have held the Office of President of San José State University. Before 1899, the officeholder was referred to as the Principal, but has since been referred to as the President. Modern names of educational institutions are used.

No.	President		Term of office	Education	Notes
Principals of Minns Evening Normal School
1		George W. Minns (1813–1895)	1857–1862 (5 years)	Bachelor's from Harvard University; LL.D., Harvard University	Founder of Minns' Evening Normal School
2		Ahira Holmes (1823–1902)	1862–1865 (3 years)	Graduated from Bridgewater Normal School	
Principals of California State Normal School
1		George W. Minns (1813–1895)	1865–1866 (11 months)	Graduated from Harvard University; LL.D., Harvard University	Founder of Minns' Evening Normal School
3		Henry P. Carlton (1821–1909)	1866–1867 (1 year)	Attended the University of Vermont	
4		George E. Tait (1831–1888)	1867–1868 (8 months)	Graduated from the University of Virginia	
3		Henry P. Carlton (1821–1909)	1868–1868 (4 months)	Attended the University of Vermont	
5		William T. Lucky (1821–1876)	1868–1873 (5 years)	A.B., McKendrie University; M.A., McKendrie University	
6		Charles H. Allen (1828–1904)	1873–1889 (16 years)		Namesake of Allen Hall, demolished in 2003
7		Charles W. Childs (1844–1922)	1889–1896 (7 years)	Dip.Ed., California State Normal School; Attended Heald College	
8		Ambrose Randall (1839–1900)	1896–1899 (3 years)	Graduated from Wesleyan University; Graduated from Western State Normal School	
9		James McNaughton (1837–1908)	1899–1900 (1 year)	Bachelor's from Allegheny College; Master's from the University of Michigan; Ph.D., University of Michigan	
10		Morris Elmer Dailey (1867–1919)	1900–1919 (18 years)	A.B., Simpson College; B.S., Drake University; M.A., Indiana University Bloomington; LL.D., Drake University	Died in office Namesake of the Morris Dailey Auditorium in Tower Hall
11 Acting		Lewis Ben Wilson (1854–1924)	1919–1920 (1 year)	Attended Washington & Jefferson College; Dip.Ed., California State Normal School; Attended Stanford University; Attended the University of California, Berkeley	
Presidents of State Teachers College at San Jose
12		William Webb Kemp (1873–1946)	1920–1923 (3 years)	A.B., Stanford University; Attended the University of California, Berkeley; Ph.D., Columbia University	
13 Acting		Alexander Richard Heron (1891–1965)	1923–1923 (3 months)	B.ComSci., Southwestern Law School	
14		Edwin Reagan Snyder (1872–1925)	1923–1925 (2 years)	Dip.Ed., State Normal School of Colorado; A.B., Stanford University; Ph.D., Columbia University	Died in office
15 Acting		Herman F. Minnsen (1890–1943)	1925–1927 (2 years)	Dip.Ed., Northern Illinois State Normal School; A.B., Stanford University; M.A., Stanford University	
16		Thomas William MacQuarrie (1879–1963)	1927–1952 (25 years)	Dip.Ed., Superior Normal School; Attended Columbia University; Attended the United States Army Command and General Staff College; A.B., Stanford University; M.A., Stanford University; Ph.D., Stanford University	Longest term of office at 25 years Namesake of MacQuarrie Hall
17		John T. Wahlquist (1899–1990)	1952–1964 (12 years)	B.A., University of Utah; Secondary teaching credential, University of Utah; School administrative credential, University of Utah; M.S., University of Utah; Ph.D., University of Cincinnati	Namesake of the Wahlquist Library, demolished in 2000
18		Robert D. Clark (1910–2005)	1964–1969 (5 years)	B.A., Pasadena College; M.A., University of Southern California; Ph.D., University of Southern California	Namesake of Robert D. Clark Hall (formerly Clark Library)
19 Acting		Hobert W. Burns (1910–2005)	1969–1970 (1 year)	A.A., Menlo School and Junior College; B.A., Stanford University; M.A., Stanford University; Ed.D., Stanford University	
Presidents of California State University, San Jose
Presidents of San José State University
20		John H. Bunzel (1924–2018)	1970–1978 (8 years)	A.B., Princeton University; M.A., Columbia University; Ph.D., University of California, Berkeley	
21		Gail Fullerton (1927–2016)	1978–1991 (13 years)	B.A., University of Nebraska; M.A., University of Nebraska–Lincoln; Ph.D., University of Oregon	First female president
22 Acting	—	J. Handel Evans (born 1938)	1991–1994 (3 years)	BArch, University of Manchester; MArch, University of Oregon; Attended University of Cambridge	
23		Robert L. Caret (born 1947)	1995–2003 (8 years)	B.S., Suffolk University; Ph.D., University of New Hampshire	Namesake of Robert L. Caret Plaza
24 Interim	—	Joseph N. Crowley (1933–2017)	2003–2004 (1 year)	Attended the University of Maryland, College Park; B.A., University of Iowa; M.A., Fresno State College; Ph.D., University of Washington	
25	—	Paul Yu (1941–2016)	2004–2004 (2 weeks)	B.A., University of Michigan; M.A., University of Michigan; Ph.D., University of Michigan	Shortest term of office at 2 weeks First Asian president
26 Interim		Don W. Kassing (born 1941)	2004–2005 (1 year)	B.S., St. Louis University; M.B.A., St. Louis University	
26		Don W. Kassing (born 1941)	2005–2008 (3 years)	B.S., St. Louis University; M.B.A., St. Louis University	
27	—	Jon Whitmore (born 1945)	2008–2010 (2 years)	B.A., Washington State University; M.A., Washington State University; Ph.D., University of California, Santa Barbara	
26 Interim		Don W. Kassing (born 1941)	2010–2011 (1 year)	B.S., St. Louis University; M.B.A., St. Louis University	
28		Mohammad Qayoumi (born 1952)	2011–2015 (4 years)	B.S., American University of Beirut; M.S., University of Cincinnati; M.S., University of Cincinnati; M.B.A., University of Cincinnati; Ph.D., University of Cincinnati	First Middle Eastern president
29 Interim		Susan W. Martin (born 1950)	2015–2016 (11 months)	B.S., Central Michigan University; M.B.A., Michigan State University; Ph.D., Michigan State University	
30		Mary A. Papazian (born 1959)	2016–2021 (5 years)	B.A., University of California, Los Angeles; M.A., University of California, Los Angeles; Ph.D., University of California, Los Angeles	
31 Interim		Stephen Perez (born 1967)	2022–2023 (1 year)	B.A., University of California, San Diego; M.A., University of California, Davis; Ph.D., University of California, Davis	
32		Cynthia Teniente-Matson (born 1965)	2023–present (3 years)	B.A., University of Alaska Fairbanks; M.B.A., University of Alaska Anchorage; Ed.D., California State University, Fresno	First Hispanic president

== Timeline of San José State University presidential terms ==
Presidents of San José State University

== See also ==
- History of San Jose State University
- List of San Jose State University people
- San Jose State Spartans
