= San Jose State University =

Public university in San Jose, California, US

San José State University
- Former names: List: Minns' Evening Normal School (1857–1862); California State Normal School (1862–1921); San Jose State Teachers College (1921–1935); San Jose State College (1935–1972); California State University, San Jose (1972–1974)
- Motto: Powering Silicon Valley
- Type: Public research university
- Established: 1857; 169 years ago
- Founder: George W. Minns
- Parent institution: California State University
- Accreditation: WSCUC
- Academic affiliations: USU; space-grant
- Endowment: $264.6 million (2025–26)
- Budget: $500.2 million (2025–26)
- President: Cynthia Teniente-Matson
- Provost: Vincent Del Casino
- Faculty: 2,177 (fall 2024)
- Administrative staff: 1,424 (fall 2022)
- Students: 37,661 (fall 2024)
- Undergraduates: 27,354 (fall 2024)
- Postgraduates: 5,468 (fall 2024)
- Location: San Jose, California, U.S. 37°20′07″N 121°52′53″W
- Campus: 154 acres (62 ha) on main campus and 62 acres (25 ha) on south campus; Large city
- Newspaper: The Spartan Daily
- Colors: Blue and gold
- Nickname: Spartans
- Sporting affiliations: NCAA Division I FBS - Mountain West; MPSF; WCC; GCC
- Mascot: Sammy Spartan
- Website: sjsu.edu

California Historical Landmark
- Official name: First Normal School in California (San Jose State College)
- Designated: 1/6/1949
- Reference no.: 417

San José State University (San José State or SJSU) is a public research university in San Jose, California, United States. Established in 1857 as the state's first normal school, it is the oldest public university in the western United States and is the founding campus of the California State University system.

Located in downtown San Jose, San Jose State's main campus spans 154 acres (62 ha), or roughly 19 square blocks. It is accredited by the WASC Senior College and University Commission and is classified among "R2: High Research Spending and Doctorate Production". It is a federally-designated Hispanic-Serving Institution as well as an Asian American and Native American Pacific Islander-Serving Institution.

SJSU comprises nine academic colleges, who offer over 250 undergraduate and graduate degree programs. Its enrollment is about 37,000 students annually, including around 28,000 undergraduate and 9,000 graduate and professional students. As of the fall of 2022, graduate student enrollment, Asian, and international student enrollments at SJSU were the highest of any campus in the CSU system.

San Jose State's sports teams compete as the Spartans in the NCAA Division I Mountain West Conference and have won 10 team national championships and 50 individual national championships. SJSU athletes have competed in every Olympics since 1948 and have amassed 21 medals.

== History ==
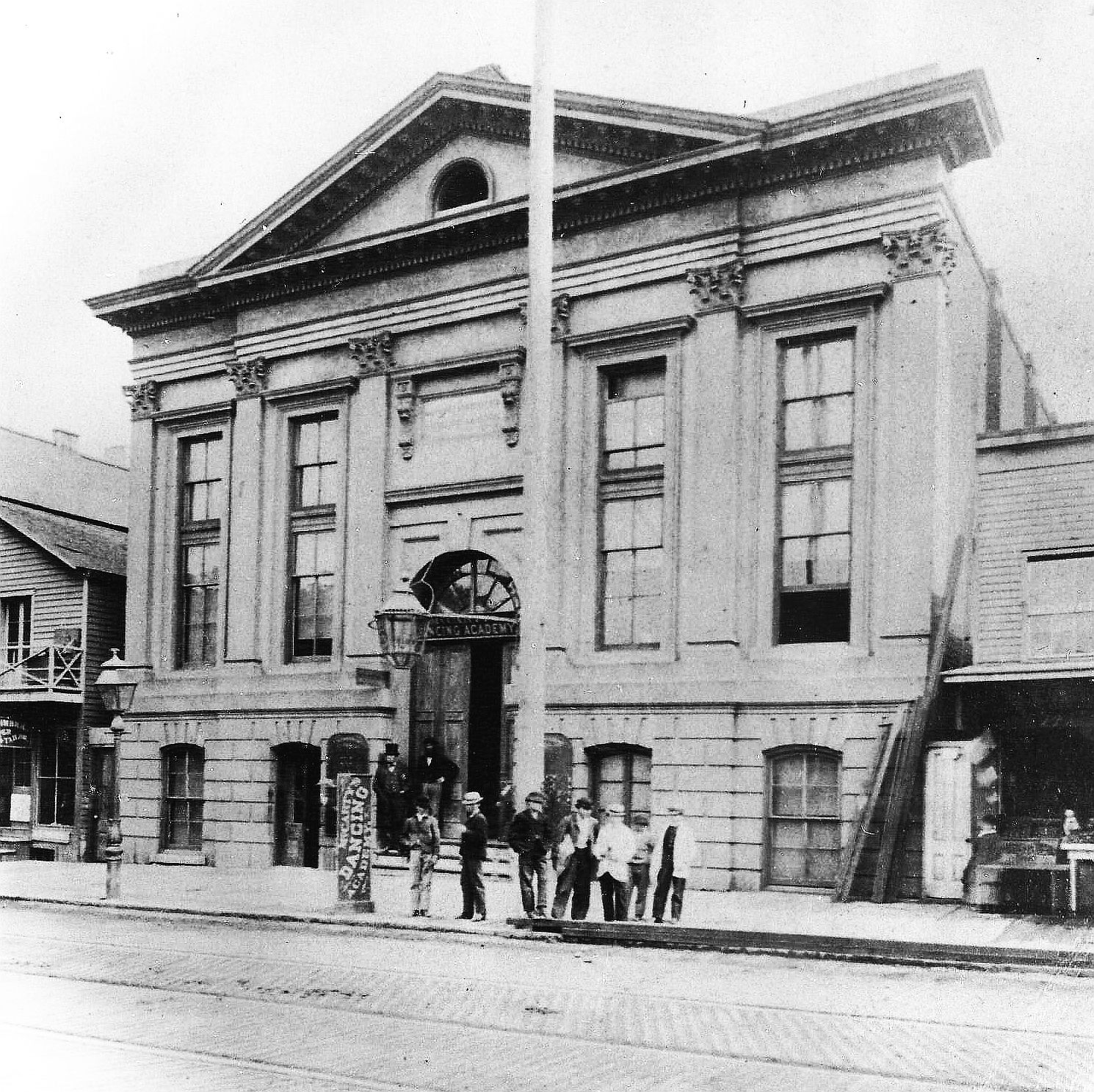
Dashaway Hall, one of six sites in San Francisco that housed the State Normal School before a permanent location was chosen in San Jose

=== Establishment ===
After a private normal school closed in San Francisco after only one year, politicians John Swett and Henry B. Janes sought to establish a normal school for San Francisco's public school system, and approached George W. Minns to be the principal for the nascent institution. The normal school began operations in 1857 and became known as the Minns Evening Normal School. Classes were only held once a week, and only graduated 54 female students across its existence, but the program proved to be enough of a success for increased funding to be approved.

In 1861, after the continued success of the Evening School, a committee was formed to create a report on the merits of fully funding a state normal school and presented its report to the California State Legislature in January 1862. On May 2, 1862, the California State Senate elected to fund a state normal school and to appoint a board of trustees. The California State Normal School was then opened on July 21, 1862.

Despite continued success, with increasing enrollment and funding, the California State Normal School quickly began to hold contention with the San Francisco Board of Education, which poached students and withheld sufficient school facilities. Because of these issues, the Normal School moved sites six times while in San Francisco, citing noise complaints, sanitary concerns, and lack of access to proper facilities and materials.

In 1868, more serious talks of finding a permanent location for the Normal School began, with a general consensus that the school needed to cut ties with the San Francisco Board of Education and move out of San Francisco. After it became public that the Normal School was looking to move for a permanent location, several cities put in bids to home the school, but after the San Jose Railroad Company paid to have the entire student and faculty body tour the city and potential locations for the school, San Jose became the preferred site. The school moved to San Jose in 1871 and was given Washington Square Park at S. 4th and San Carlos Streets, where the campus remains to this day.

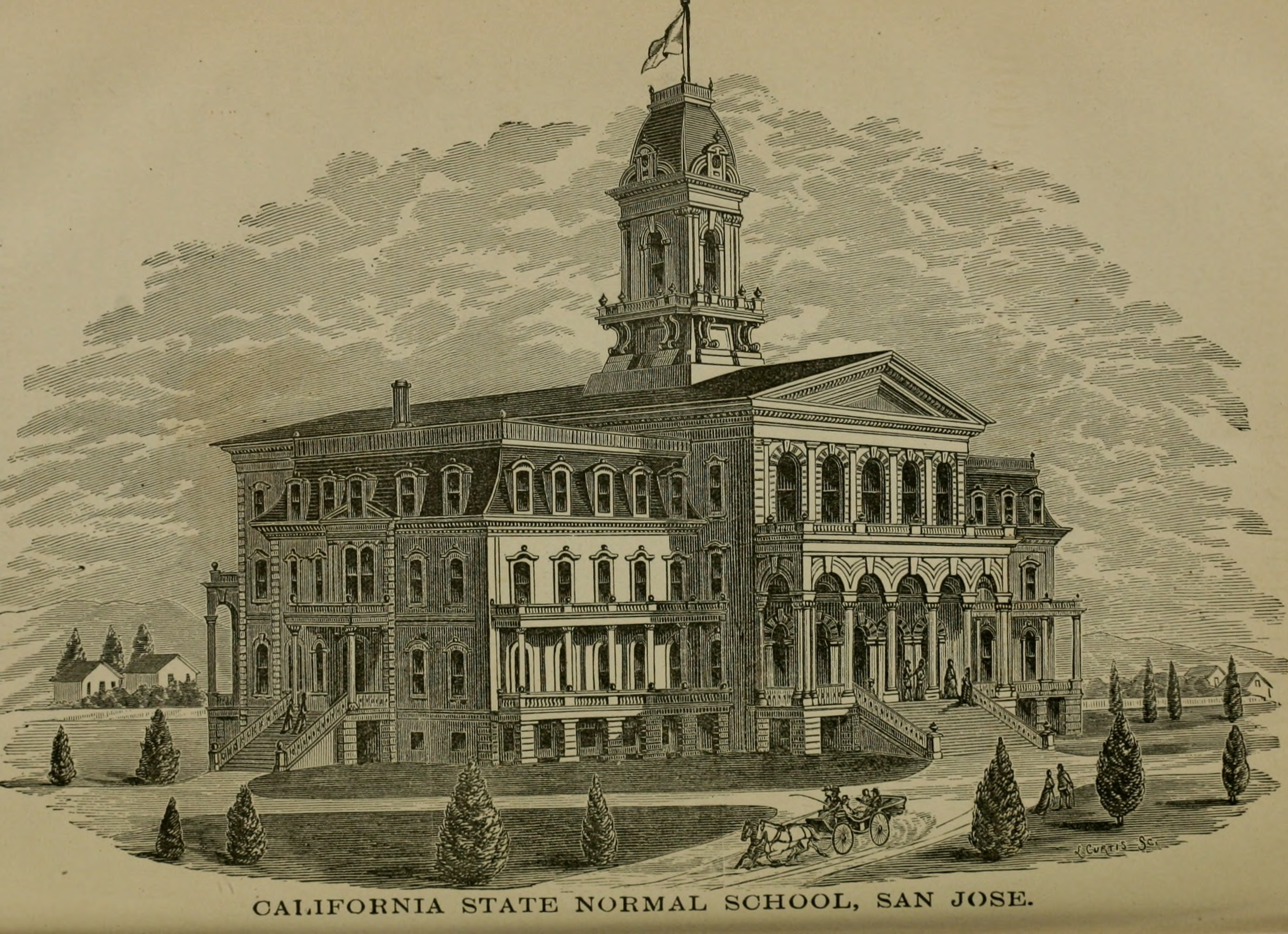
The first building on Washington Square, which was destroyed in a fire in 1880

The first building on Washington Square was opened in 1871 and fully completed in 1876, but in 1880 the building was destroyed in a fire. After its destruction, Principal Charles H. Allen journeyed to Sacramento to request the California State Legislator for emergency funds for a new building. This caused significant debate in the senate about the effectiveness of the school and if it would be better served elsewhere. The California State Senate voted to move the school to Los Angeles, but was ultimately kept in San Jose after objections by the California State Assembly. The legislature ultimately settled to give partial emergency funds to the school for the construction of a new building, which finished construction in 1881.

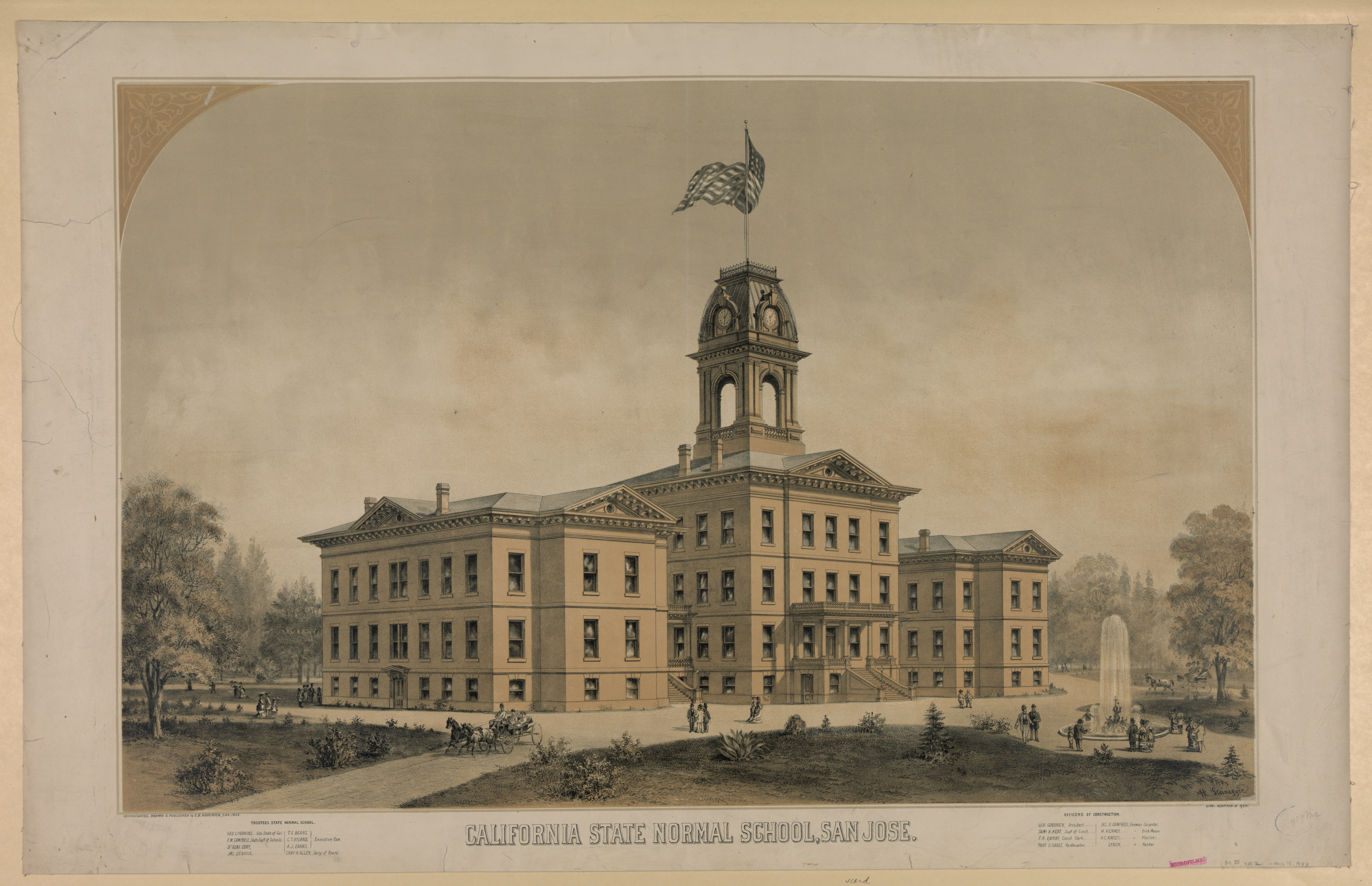
Initially built to replace the building that was destroyed in 1880, the second State Normal School Building was destroyed in the 1906 San Francisco earthquake.

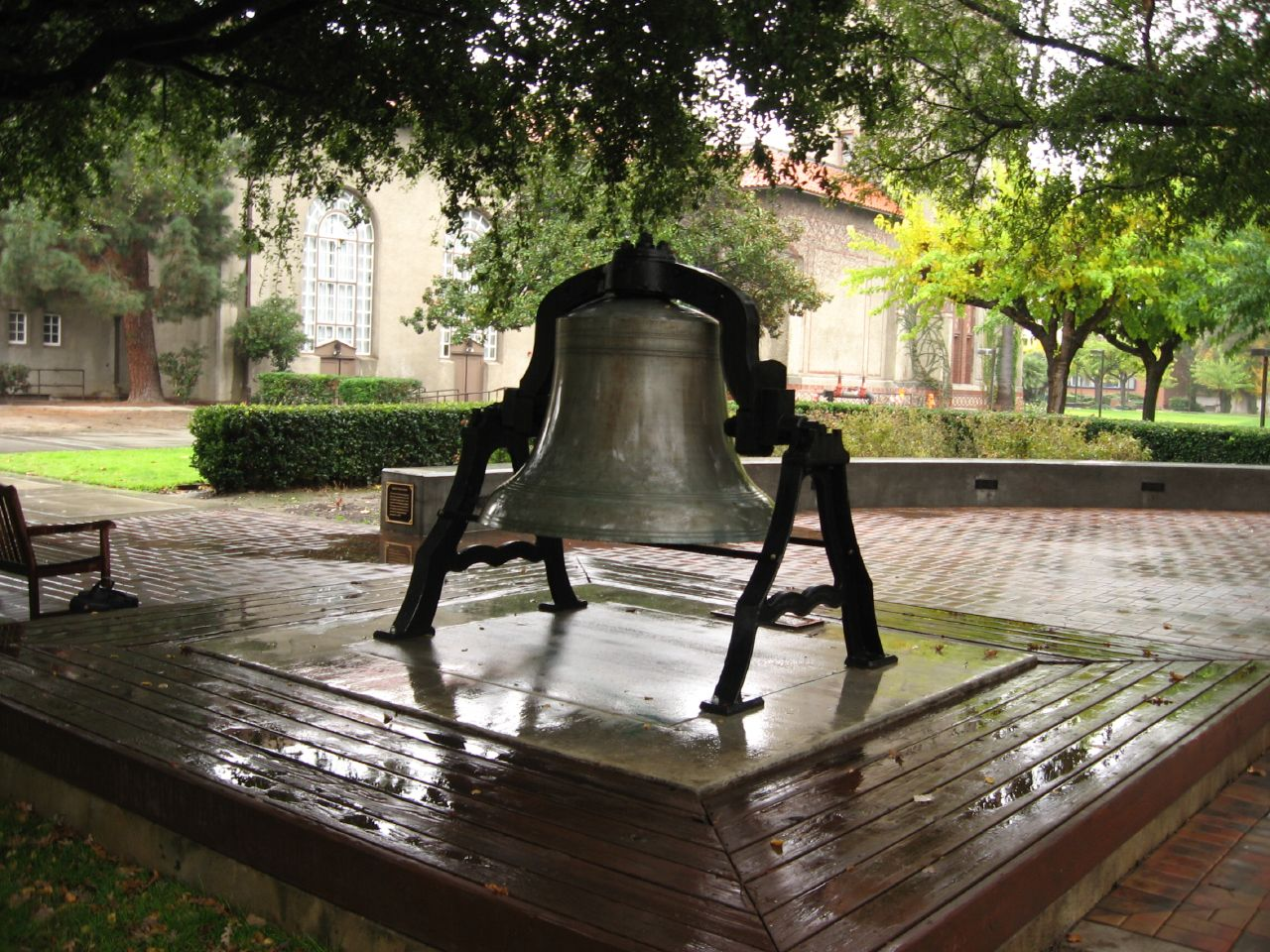
The California State Normal School Bell, forged in 1881, still graces the San Jose campus.

As a part of the construction of the new building, a large bell was forged to commemorate the school. The bell cost $1,200 ($40,034 in 2025), and was inscribed with the words "California State Normal School, A.D. 1881," and would sound on special occasions until 1946 when the college obtained new chimes. The original bell appears on the SJSU campus to this day and is still associated with various student traditions and rituals.

Immediately after the failed attempt to move State Normal School to Los Angeles, California State Senator J.P. West sponsored a bill to create a "Branch State Normal School" in Los Angeles. The bill was passed by both houses, and opened in August 1882. The southern branch campus remained under administrative control of the San Jose campus until 1887. In 1919, the school became the southern branch of the University of California, and later became the University of California, Los Angeles.

=== 20th Century ===
In 1921, the California State Normal School changed its name to the State Teachers College at San Jose. The following year, the college adopted the Spartans as the official mascot and nickname. Mascots and nicknames prior to 1922 included the Daniels, the Teachers, the Pedagogues, the Normals and the Normalites.

In 1930, the Justice Studies Department was founded as a two-year police science degree program. It offered the first policing degree in the United States. A stone monument and plaque are displayed close to the site of the original police school near Tower Hall.

In 1935, the State Teachers Colleges became the California State Colleges and the school's name was changed again, this time to San Jose State College.

In 1942, the old gym (now named Yoshihiro Uchida Hall, after SJSU judo coach Yosh Uchida) was used to register and collect Japanese Americans before sending them to internment camps. Uchida's own family members were interred at some of these camps.

In 1963, in an effort to save Tower Hall from demolition, SJSU students and alumni organized testimonials before the State College Board of Trustees, sent telegrams, and provided signed petitions. As a result of those efforts, the tower, a principal campus landmark and SJSU icon, was refurbished and reopened in 1966. The tower was again renovated and restored in 2007. Tower Hall is registered with the California Office of Historic Preservation.

During the 1960s and early 1970s, San Jose State College witnessed a rise in political activism and civic awareness among its student body, including major student protests against the Vietnam War. One of the largest campus protests took place in 1967 when Dow Chemical Company — a major manufacturer of napalm used in the war — came to campus to conduct job recruiting. An estimated 3,000 students and bystanders surrounded the 7th Street administration building and more than 200 students and teachers lay down on the ground in front of the recruiters.

In 1972, upon meeting criteria established by the board of trustees and the Coordinating Council for Higher Education, SJSC was granted university status and its name was changed to California State University, San Jose. However, in 1974, the California legislature voted to change the school's name to San José State University.

In 1982, the English department began sponsoring the annual Bulwer-Lytton Fiction Contest.

In 1985, the CADRE Laboratory for New Media was established. It is believed to be the second oldest media lab of its kind in the United States.

In 1999, San Jose State and the City of San Jose agreed to combine their main libraries to form a joint city-university library on campus, the first known collaboration of this type in the United States. The combined library faced opposition, with critics stating the two libraries had very different objectives and that the project would be too expensive. Despite opposition, the $177 million project proceeded, and the Dr. Martin Luther King Jr. Library opened on time and on budget in 2003.

=== 21st Century ===
During its 2006–07 fiscal year, SJSU received a record $50+ million in private gifts and $84 million in capital campaign contributions. The next year, SJSU received a CASE WealthEngine Award in recognition of raising over $100 million. SJSU was one of approximately 50 institutions nationwide honored by CASE in 2008 for overall performance in educational fundraising.

In October 2010, SJSU President Don Kassing publicly launched SJSU's first comprehensive capital fundraising campaign. The original goal of the multi-year campaign was to raise $150 million but was later increased to $200 million. The campaign would eventually exceed its goal one year earlier than anticipated, raising more than $208 million by 2013.

In 2012, the NASA Ames Research Center in Mountain View, California, awarded SJSU $73.3 million to participate in the development of systems for improving the safety and efficiency of air and space travel. NASA scientists, SJSU faculty, and SJSU graduate students worked collaboratively on this effort. The grant was the largest federal award in SJSU history.

=== University principals and presidents ===
Thirty-two people have led San Jose State since its founding, including eight principals, fifteen presidents, five acting presidents, and four interim presidents.

Principals			Presidents								
#	Name	Years served	#	Name	Years served	#	Name	Years served	#	Name	Years served
1	George W. Minns	1857–1862	9	James McNaughton	1899–1900	19	Hobert W. Burns^{A}	1969–1970	26	Don W. Kassing^{T}	2010–2011
2	Ahira Holmes	1862–1865	10	Morris Elmer Dailey	1900–1918	20	John H. Bunzel	1970–1978	28	Mohammad Qayoumi	2011–2015
1	George W. Minns	1865–1866	11	Lewis Ben Wilson^{A}	1919–1920	21	Gail Fullerton	1978–1991	29	Susan W. Martin^{T}	2015–2016
3	Henry P. Carlton	1866–1867	12	William Webb Kemp	1920–1923	22	J. Handel Evans^{A}	1991–1994	30	Mary A. Papazian	2016–2021
4	George E. Tait	1867–1868	13	Alexander Richard Heron^{A}	1923–1923	23	Robert L. Caret	1995–2003	31	Stephen Perez^{T}	2022–2023
3	Henry P. Carlton	1868–1868	14	Edwin Reagan Snyder	1923–1925	24	Joseph N. Crowley^{T}	2003–2004	32	Cynthia Teniente-Matson	2023–Present
5	William T. Lucky	1868–1873	15	Herman F. Minssen^{A}	1923–1927	25	Paul Yu	2004–2004			
6	Charles H. Allen	1873–1889	16	Thomas William MacQuarrie	1927–1952	26	Don W. Kassing^{T}	2004–2005			
7	Charles W. Childs	1889–1896	17	John T. Wahlquist	1952–1964	26	Don W. Kassing	2005–2008			
8	Ambrose Randall	1896–1899	18	Robert D. Clark	1964–1969	27	Jon Whitmore	2008–2010			
^{A} = Acting president ^{T} = Interim president

== Campus ==
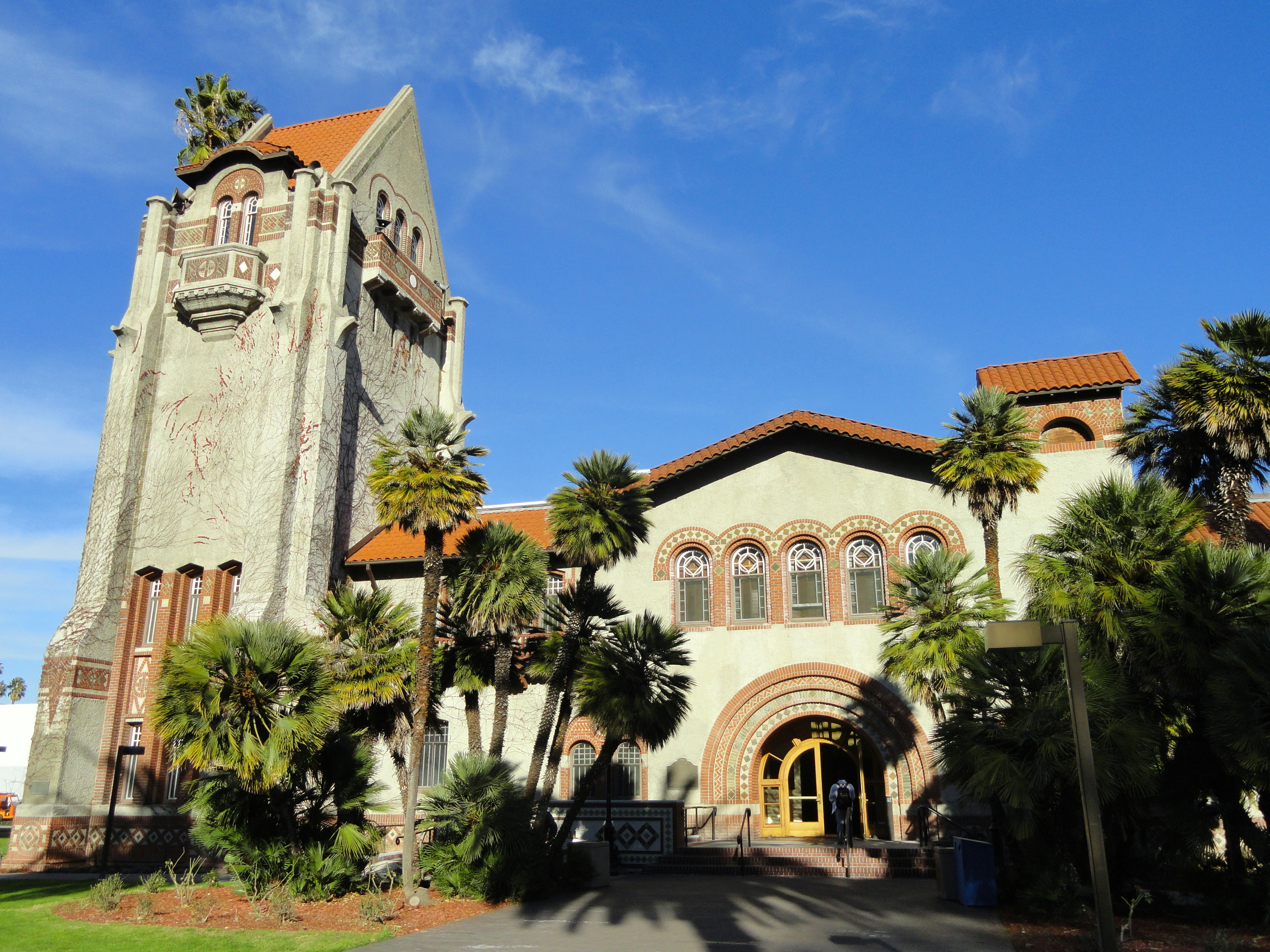
Built in 1910, Tower Hall is the oldest structure on the SJSU campus.

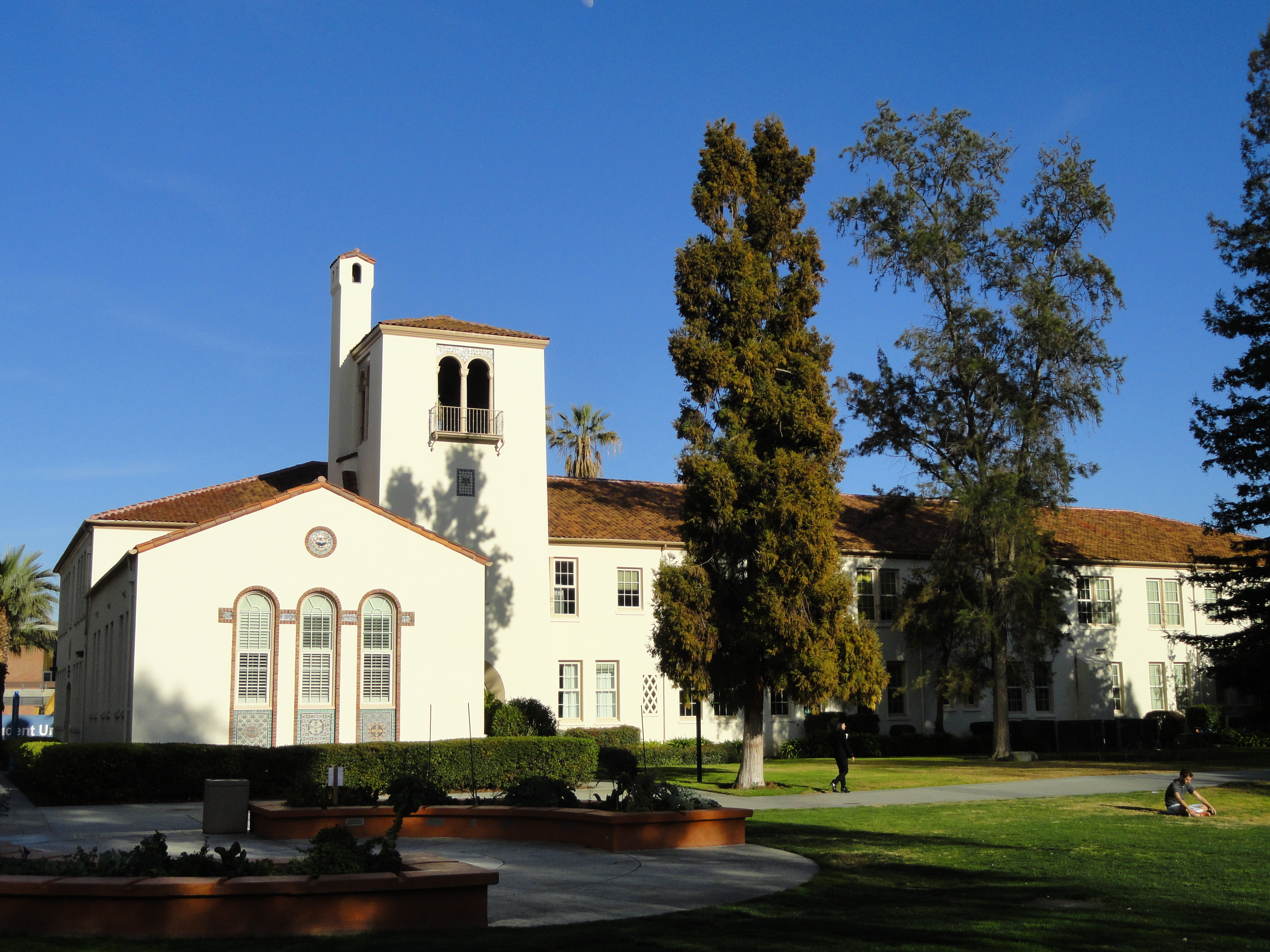
The Central Classroom Building is the third oldest structure on campus.

The SJSU main campus comprises approximately 55 buildings situated on a rectangular, 154-acre (62.3 ha) area in downtown San Jose. The campus is bordered by San Fernando Street to the north, San Salvador Street to the south, South 4th Street to the west, and South 10th Street to the east. The south campus, which is home to many of the school's athletics facilities, is located approximately 1.5 miles (2.4 kilometres) south of the main campus on South 7th Street.

California State Normal School did not receive a permanent home until it moved from San Francisco to San Jose in 1871. The original California State Normal School campus in San Jose consisted of several rectangular, wooden buildings with a central grass quadrangle. The wooden buildings were destroyed by fire in 1880 and were replaced by interconnected stone and masonry structures of roughly the same configuration in 1881.

These buildings were declared unsafe following the 1906 San Francisco earthquake and were being torn down when an aftershock of the magnitude that was predicted to destroy the buildings occurred and no damage was observed. Accordingly, demolition was stopped, and the portions of the buildings still standing were subsequently transformed into four halls: Tower Hall, Morris Dailey Auditorium, Washington Square Hall and Dwight Bentel Hall. These four structures remain standing to this day and are the oldest buildings on campus.

Beginning in the fall of 1994, the on-campus segments of San Carlos Street, 7th Street and 9th Street were closed to automobile traffic and converted to pedestrian walkways and green belts within the campus. San Carlos Street was renamed Paseo de San Carlos, 7th Street became Paseo de César Chávez, and 9th Street is now called the Ninth Street Plaza. The project was completed in 1996.

Completed in 1999, the Business Classroom Project was a $16 million renovation of the James F. Boccardo Business Education Center. The $1.5 million Heritage Gateway project was completed in the same year. The privately funded project featured construction of eight oversized gateways around the main campus perimeter.

In the fall of 2000, the SJSU Police Department, which is part of the larger California State University Police Department, opened a new on-campus, multi-level facility on 7th Street.

The $177 million Dr. Martin Luther King Jr. Library, which opened its doors on August 1, 2003, won the Library Journal's 2004 Library of the Year award, the publication's highest honor. The King Library represents the first collaboration of its kind between a university and a major U.S. city. The library is eight stories high, has 475,000 square feet (44,100 m^{2}) of floor space, and houses approximately 1.3 million volumes. San Jose's first public library occupied the same site from 1901 to 1936, and SJSU's Wahlquist Library occupied the site from 1961 to 2000.

In 2007, a $2 million renovation of Tower Hall was completed. Tower Hall is among the oldest and most recognizable buildings on campus. It was registered as an official California Historical Landmark in 1949. The building was rededicated in 1910 after numerous campus structures were either destroyed or heavily damaged in the 1906 earthquake. Tower Hall, Morris Dailey Auditorium, Washington Square Hall and Dwight Bentel Hall are the four oldest buildings on campus.

The Diaz Compean Student Union is a four-story, stand-alone facility that features a food court, the Spartan Bookstore, a multi-level study area, ballrooms, a bowling alley, music room and large game room. In September 2010, a $90 million expansion and renovation of the student union commenced. The project added approximately 100,000 square feet (9,300 m^{2}) including construction of new ballrooms, food court, theater, meeting rooms and student program spaces. The expansion phase of the project was completed in June 2014. The renovation phase of the project was completed in August 2015.

Construction of a new, three-story, 52,000-square-foot (4,800 m^{2}) on-campus health center at 7th Street and Paseo de San Carlos was completed in March 2015. The building houses the Student Health Center, Student Affairs office, Counseling Services and Wellness Center. The project was completed at a cost of over $36 million.

In August 2015, a $55 million renovation of the Spartan Complex was completed. The Spartan Complex houses open recreation spaces, gymnasiums, an indoor aquatics center, the kinesiology department, weight rooms, locker rooms, dance and judo studios, and other classroom space. The primary project objectives were to expand existing structures, upgrade the structures to make them compliant with current building codes, correct ADA deficiencies, remove hazardous materials and correct fire safety deficiencies.

=== Residence halls ===
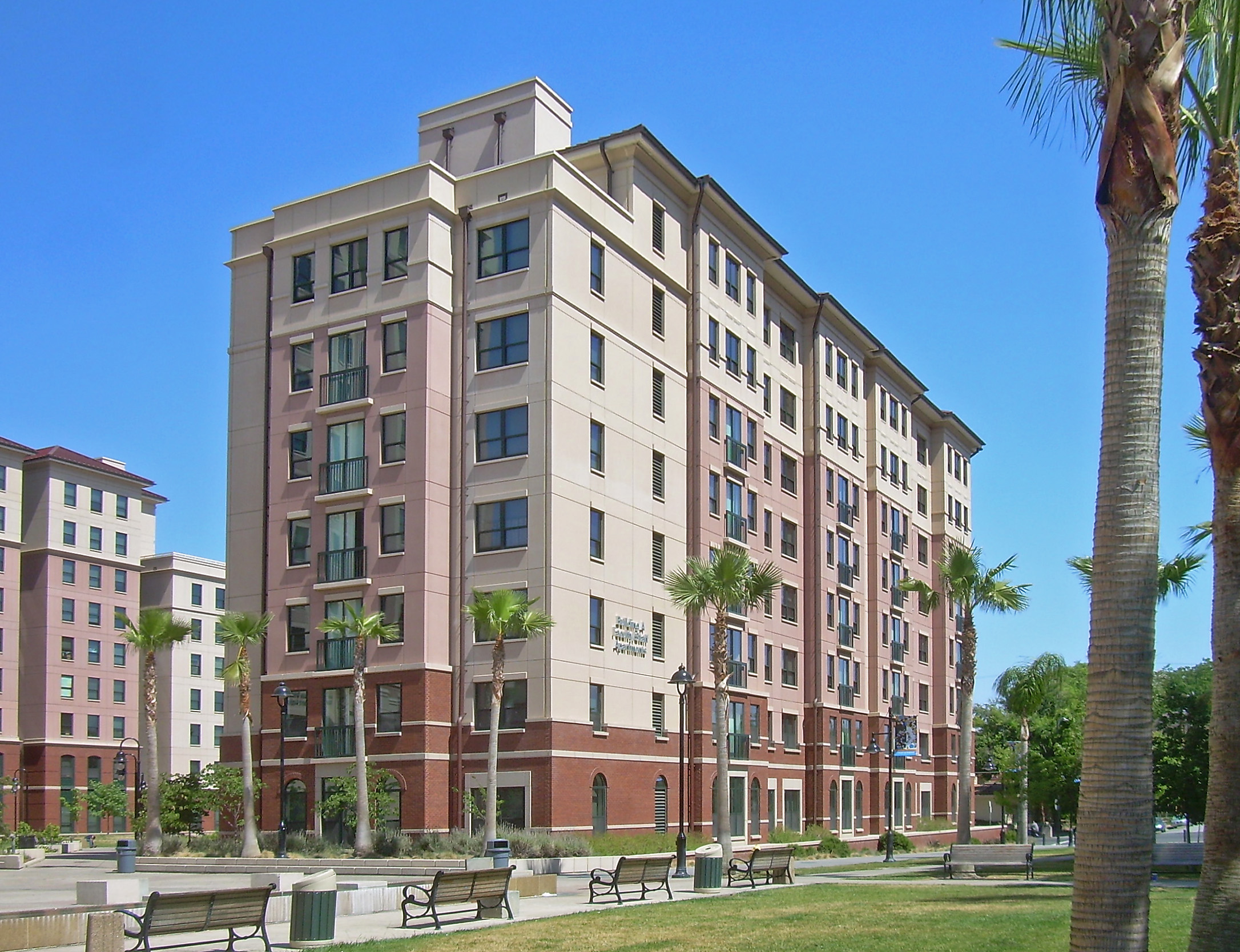
One of three Campus Village student residence buildings towers over the southeast corner of the SJSU main campus. A total of seven residences halls provide on-campus housing for 4,458 students.

The SJSU on-campus housing community comprises seven residence halls, which can accommodate a combined total of 4,458 students. When the third phase of the Campus Village is completed, SJSU's total on-campus student housing capacity should increase from 4,458 to 4,928. The projected total cost for this project is approximately $334 million.

In January 2023, the California State University Board of Trustees approved a public-private partnership between SJSU and local investors that will allow the former Alfred E. Alquist state office building site to be transformed into new housing for SJSU faculty, staff, and graduate students. Located one block west of the SJSU main campus, the 1.6-acre (0.65 ha) parcel will be the site of approximately 1,000 new housing rental units. Up to half of those units will be reserved for graduate students. The new housing development will comprise one or more high-rise structures up to 300 feet (91.4 m) tall. The estimated total cost of the project is $750 million. The project's design phase is projected to be completed by early 2024. Construction is projected to begin in late 2024 and be completed in 2027.

=== Additional on-campus facilities ===
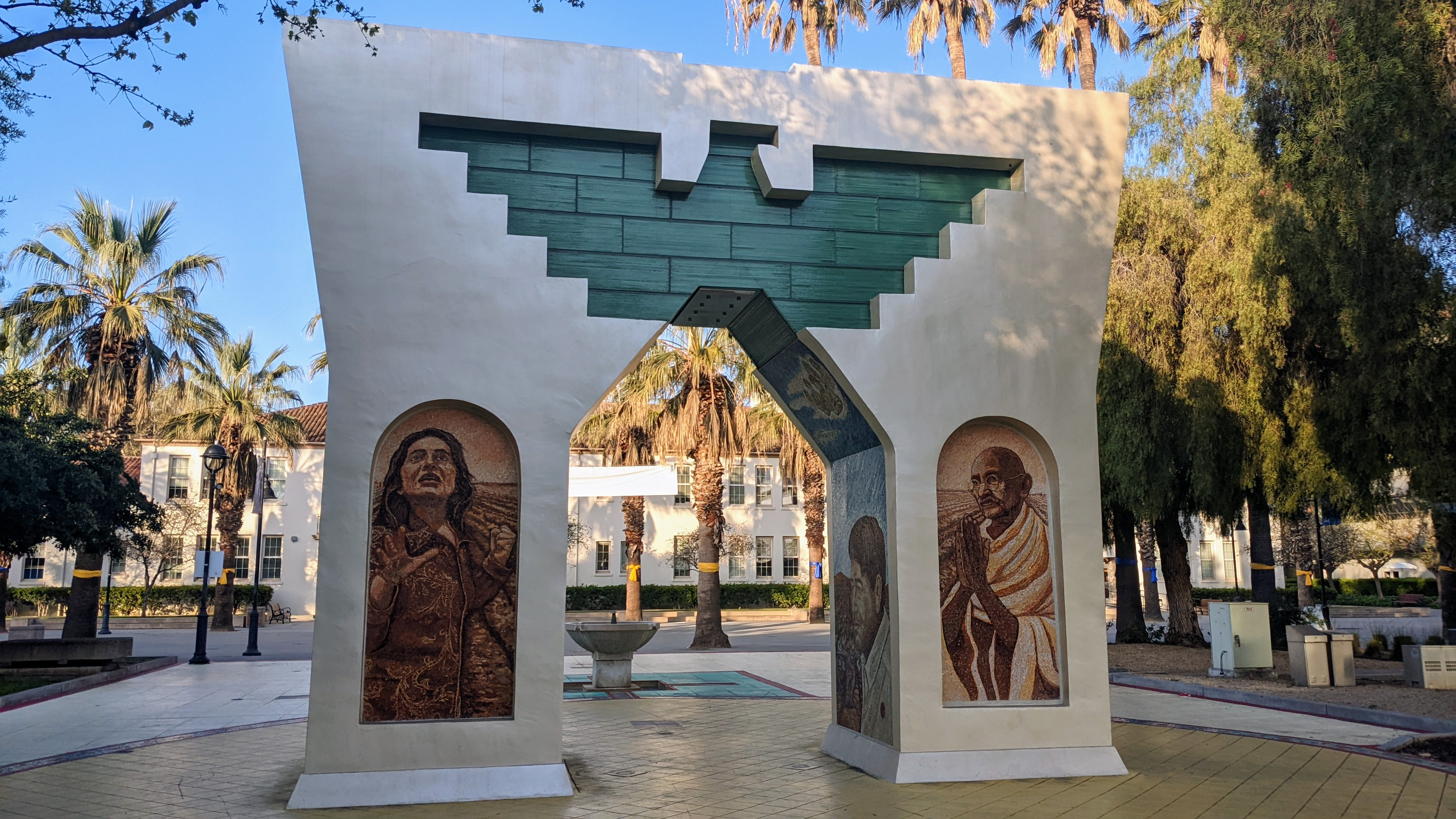
The Arch of Dignity, Equality, and Justice, 2008, by Judy Baca, on the Paseo de César Chávez

SJSU is home to the 10,000-square-foot (930 m^{2}), three-story Nuclear Science Facility. It is the only nuclear science facility of its kind in the California State University system.

Located on the main campus, the Provident Credit Union Event Center seats approximately 5,000 people for athletic events and over 6,500 for concerts.

A new student recreation and aquatic center opened in April 2019. At a cost of $132 million, the new facility houses multiple gymnasiums, basketball courts, multiple weight and fitness centers, exercise rooms, rock climbing wall, indoor track, indoor soccer fields, and competition and recreation pools with support spaces. The new facility is located on the main campus at the corner of 7th Street and San Carlos on the site of the old aquatic center, which was demolished in 2017.

Construction of a new interdisciplinary science building broke ground in April 2019. At a projected cost of $181 million, the new facility will house teaching labs, research labs, faculty offices, a dean's suite and interdisciplinary spaces totaling 164,000 square feet (15,200 m^{2}). The project site is located on the southwest quadrant of campus just north of Duncan Hall. The new building was completed in 2023.

=== South Campus ===
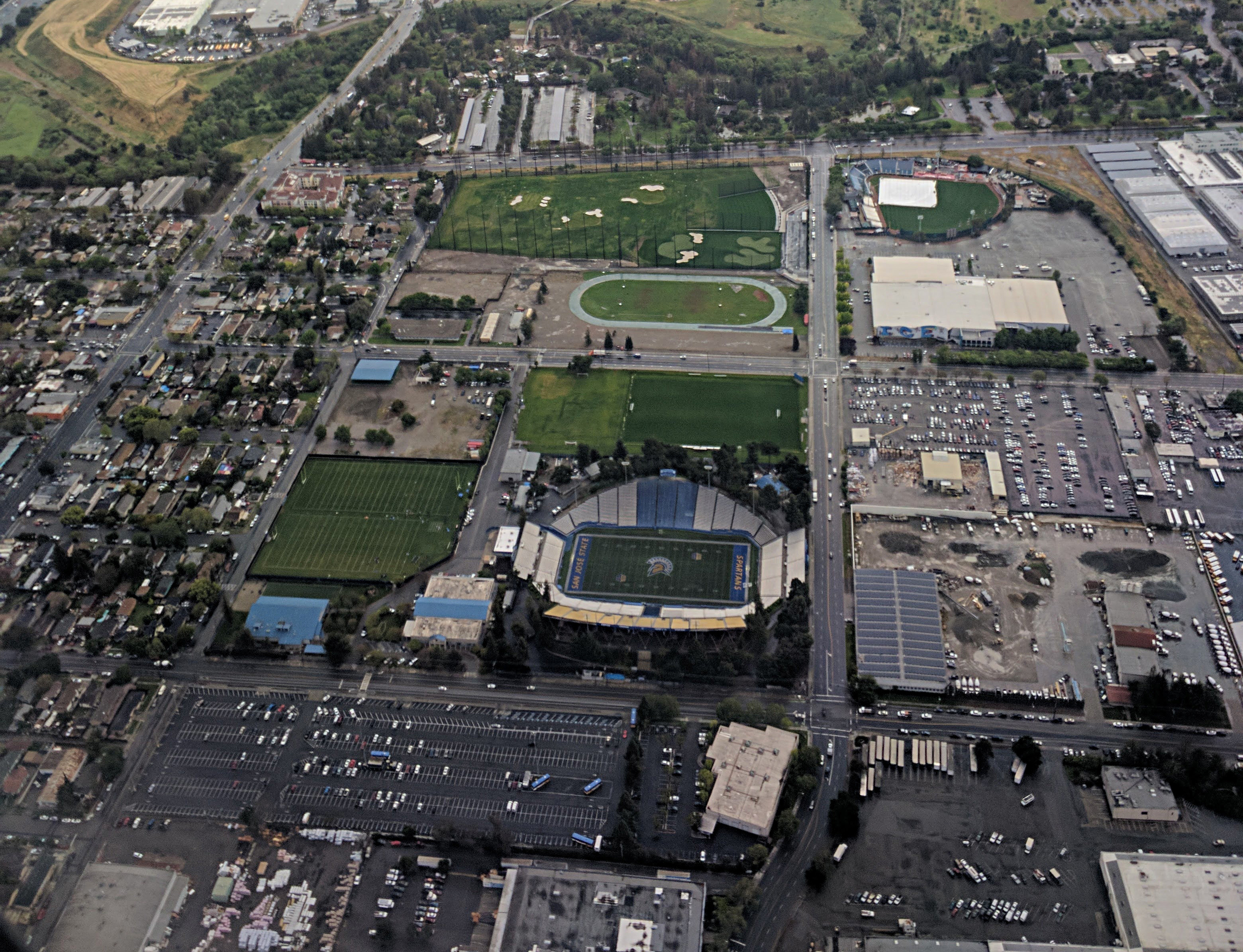
A 2017 view of South Campus, stretching from the parking lot west of CEFCU Stadium to the golf course

SJSU's South Campus is located in the Spartan Keyes neighborhood, just south of Downtown San Jose. Many of SJSU's athletics facilities, including CEFCU Stadium (formerly known as Spartan Stadium) and the Spartan Golf Complex, along with the athletics department administrative offices and multiple training, practice and competition facilities, are located on the 62-acre (25.1 ha) south campus approximately 1.5 miles (2.4 kilometres) south of the main campus near 7th Street. The south campus also is home to student overflow parking. Shuttle buses run between the main campus and south campus every 10 to 15 minutes Monday through Thursday.

In April 2014, a new $76 million master plan to renovate the entire South Campus was unveiled. The estimated cost was later increased to $150 million. The plan called for construction of a golf training facility, new baseball and softball stadiums, new outdoor recreation and intramural facility, new soccer and tennis facilities, three beach volleyball courts, a new multilevel parking garage, a new track and field facility, and a football stadium addition and renovation. The new golf, soccer and tennis facilities opened in 2017. The new softball facility opened in 2018, and the beach volleyball courts were completed in 2019. The intramural facility and parking garage were completed in 2021 along with the first phase of a new baseball facility.

In August 2023, the first phase of the football stadium project was completed at an approximate cost of $70 million. Known as the Spartan Athletics Center, the 55,000 square-foot, multi-story facility houses a new football operations center, locker rooms, offices, meeting and training rooms and a sports medicine center. The facility also includes soccer team offices and locker rooms, as well as dining and hospitality facilities, event spaces and premium viewing areas. Phase II, which is tentatively slated to include installation of premium spectator seating on the stadium's east side, remains in the planning stages as of 2023.

Remaining South Campus projects were either under construction or still in the planning stages, as of 2023.

=== Off-campus facilities ===
SJSU Simpkins International House, at 360 S. 11th Street, provides housing for domestic as well as international students of the university. International House (also known as I-House) is a co-ed residence facility for 70 U.S. and international students attending San José State University. The building has served as a residence hall since 1980, and offers cultural exchanges for U.S. students as well as residents from abroad.

The SJSU Department of Aviation and Technology maintains a 6,000-square-foot (560 m^{2}) academic facility at the Reid-Hillview Airport.

SJSU manages the Moss Landing Marine Laboratories (MLML) in Moss Landing, California, at Monterey Bay. MLML is a cooperative research facility of seven CSU campuses. Construction of an aquaculture laboratory at the MLML site was completed in August 2014. The building project included construction of a 1,400-square-foot (130 m^{2}) aquaculture lab building and installation of a 1,584-square-foot (147.2 m^{2}) tank slab area. The project was made possible by grants from the Packard Foundation.

SJSU International and Extended Studies facility is at 384 S. 2nd Street. This off-campus classroom building houses SJSU's International Gateway Programs, a collection of classes geared toward introducing international students to the English language and American culture.

University Club, at 408 S. 8th Street, is a 16-room, multi-level dining, special events, and bed-and-breakfast style residence facility for faculty, staff, visiting scholars and graduate students of the university. This building is currently occupied by Alpha Omicron Pi sorority in agreement with the university.

Known simply as North Fourth Street (210 N. 4th Street, San Jose), this four-story facility houses the Global Studies Institute, Governmental and External Affairs, International and Extended Studies, the Mineta Transportation Institute, the Processed Foods Institute, and the SJSU Research Foundation.

== Organization ==
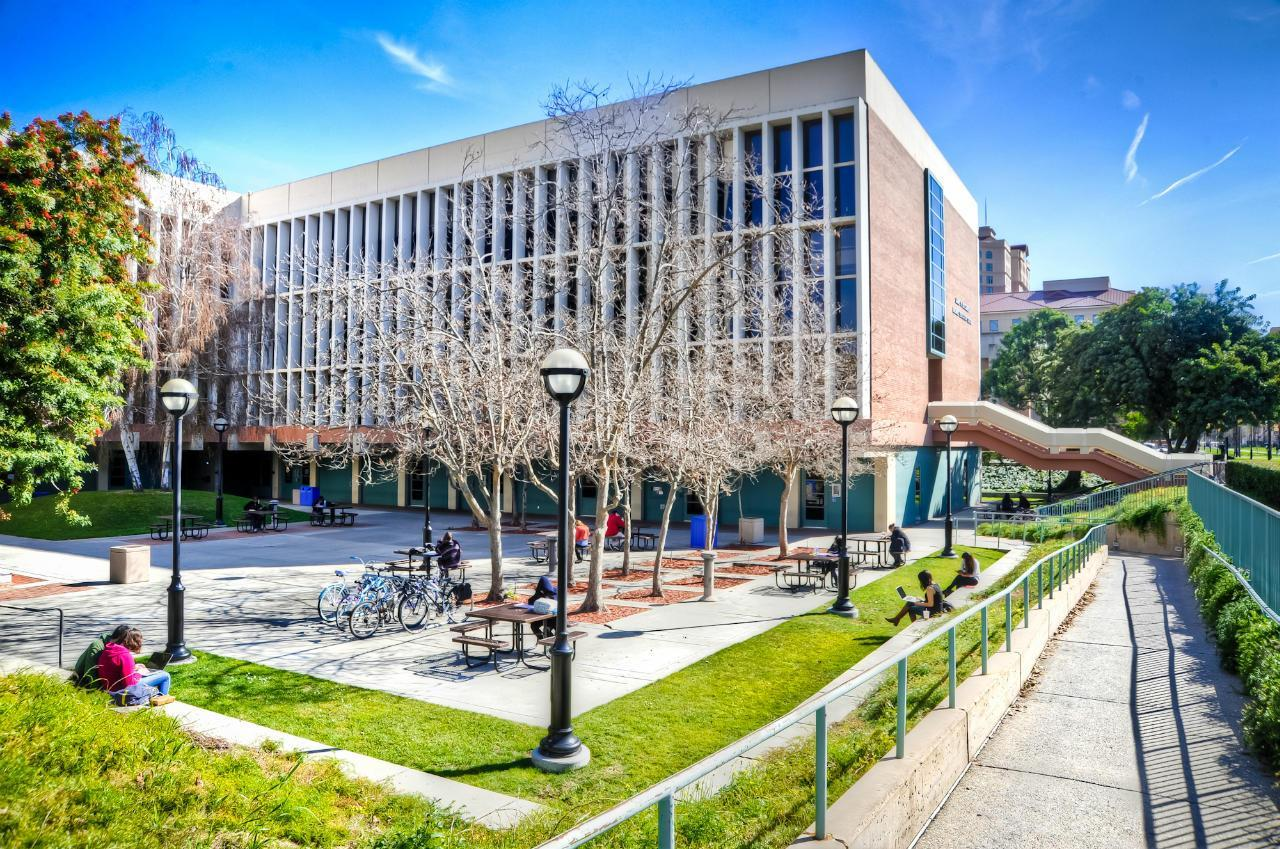
The Boccardo Business Complex at the Lucas College and Graduate School of Business

As a member institution of the California State University System, San Jose State falls under the jurisdiction of the California State University Board of Trustees and the chancellor of the California State University.

The chief executive of San José State University is the university president. In November 2022, the California State University Board of Trustees named Cynthia Teniente-Matson as the new SJSU president. Teniente-Matson previously served as the president of Texas A&M University–San Antonio, and began her tenure at San Jose State on January 16, 2023.

The university is organized into nine colleges:

- Lucas College and Graduate School of Business
- Connie L. Lurie College of Education
- Charles W. Davidson College of Engineering
- College of Graduate Studies
- College of Health and Human Sciences (formerly the College of Applied Sciences and Arts)
- College of Humanities and the Arts
- College of Information, Data & Society (formerly the College of Professional and Global Education)
- College of Science
- College of Social Sciences

Additionally, SJSU has seven focused schools:

- School of Art and Design
- Lucas College and Graduate School of Business
- School of Information
- School of Journalism and Mass Communications
- School of Music and Dance
- The Valley Foundation School of Nursing
- School of Social Work

== Academics ==
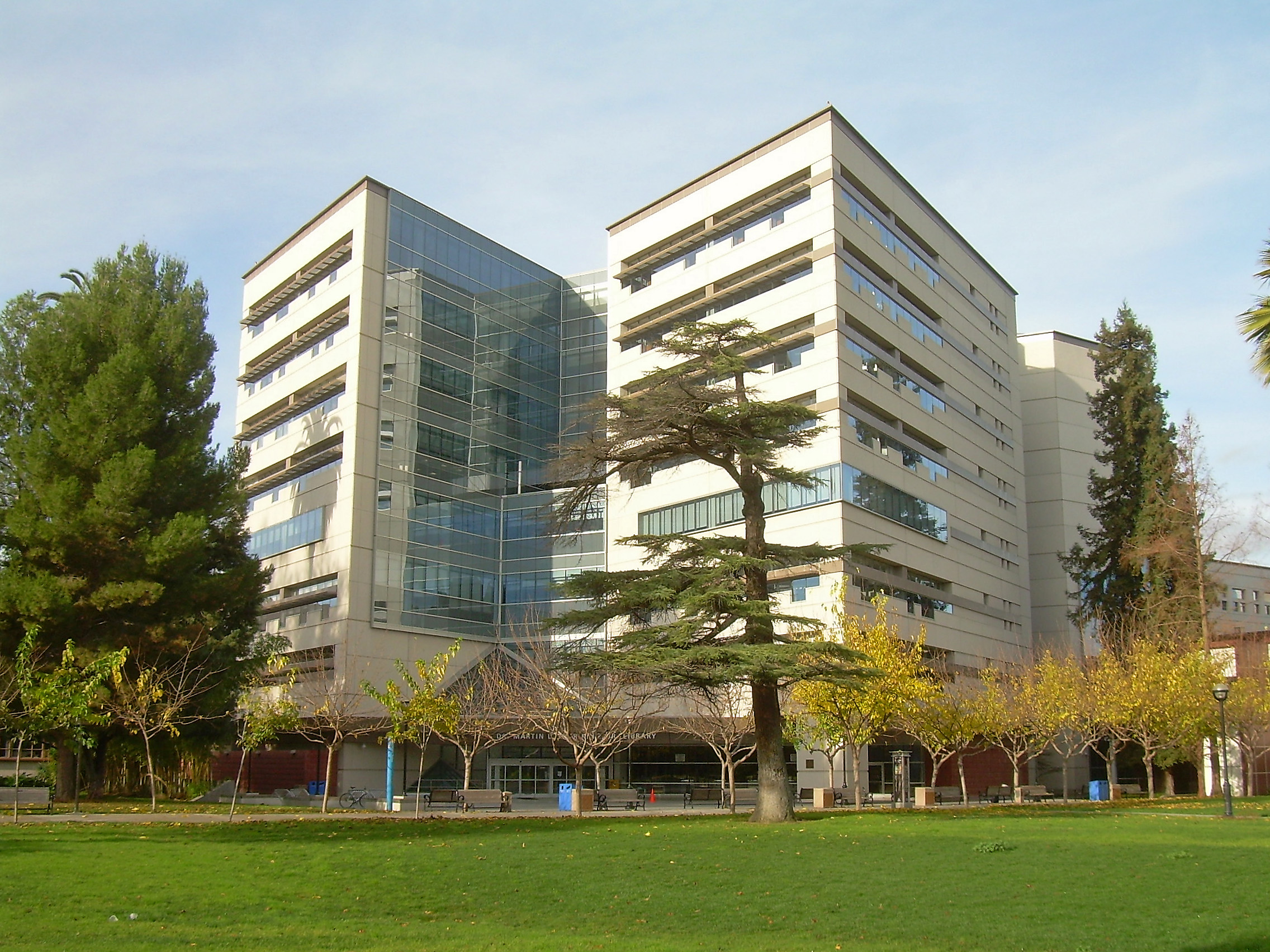
The Dr. Martin Luther King Jr. Library houses over 1.6 million volumes.

As of spring 2023, San José State University offered 150 bachelor's degree programs, 95 master's degree programs, five doctoral degree programs, 11 credential programs, and 42 certificate programs. SJSU is accredited by the WASC Senior College and University Commission.

SJSU's doctoral degree offerings include a Ph.D. program in library and information science offered jointly through Manchester Metropolitan University in Manchester, England, a doctor of audiology (Au.D.), an Ed.D. program in educational leadership, a doctor of nursing practice (DNP), and an occupational therapy doctorate (OTD).

As of the fall of 2024, the university's Charles W. Davidson College of Engineering, with 7,133 undergraduate and graduate students, was the largest college on campus. SJSU's Lucas College and Graduate School of Business was the second largest college on campus with a total enrollment of 6,745 undergraduate and graduate students. The university's College of Social Sciences, with 5,442 undergraduate and graduate students, was the third-largest college at SJSU. Enrollment wise, the Lucas College of Business is among the largest business schools in the country. It is accredited by the Association to Advance Collegiate Schools of Business (AACSB) at both the graduate and undergraduate levels.

=== Rankings ===
Academic rankings

Master's
- Washington Monthly: 23

National
- Forbes: 87
- U.S. News & World Report: 137
- WSJ/College Pulse: 17

Global
- THE: 1001–1200
- U.S. News & World Report: 1636

2026–2027 USNWR National Undergraduate rankings
Top Public Schools	137
Best Colleges for Veterans	96
Top Performers on Social Mobility	37
Best Value Schools	127
Best Undergraduate Engineering Programs	15 (At schools where doctorate not offered)
Computer Engineering	4
Electrical Engineering / Electronic / Communications	12
Mechanical Engineering	12
Computer Science	110
Nursing	115
Business	115
Economics	201

2026–2027 USNWR Best Graduate School rankings
Library and Information Studies	19
Occupational Therapy	37
Speech-Language Pathology	67
Audiology	68
Social Work	77
Fine Arts	92
Public Affairs	120
Education	133
Statistics	133
Public Health	136
Part-time MBA	174

Top 10 foreign countries in headcount (Fall 2025)
Country	Headcount
India	1,160
Vietnam	213
China	144
Taiwan	114
Myanmar	104
Mexico	69
South Korea	59
Japan	45
Canada	42
Nepal	34

According to the 2027 U.S. News & World Report college rankings, San Jose State was ranked No. 137 nationally in the United States.

SJSU's undergraduate engineering program was ranked tied for No. 12 nationally among 230 public and private colleges that do not offer doctoral degrees in engineering, according to the 2022-2023 U.S. News & World Report college rankings.

SJSU was ranked No. 107 out of approximately 500 institutions nationwide on the 2022 Forbes America's Top Colleges list. SJSU was ranked No. 43 nationally on the Forbes list of top public universities and colleges. Forbes also ranked SJSU No. 40 nationally out of approximately 300 colleges and universities on the most recent list of America's Best Value Colleges (2019).

Money magazine ranked San Jose State No. 31 nationally out of approximately 625 schools it evaluated for its 2022 "Best Colleges in America" ranking. Money also ranked SJSU No. 27 nationally on its 2022 list of Best Public Colleges, No. 39 on its list of Best Colleges for Engineering Majors, and No. 19 on Money's list of Best Colleges in the West. Money magazine ranked San Jose State No. 1 nationally on its 2020 list of "Most Transformative Colleges."

SJSU was ranked No. 16 out of more than 800 U.S. colleges and universities in the Wall Street Journal/Times Higher Education College Rankings 2025. The ranking was based on 15 individual performance indicators and responses from more than 170,000 current college students.

Washington Monthly ranked SJSU No. 53 nationally out of 603 master's universities (2022). Washington Monthly ranks colleges based on their "contribution to the public good in three broad categories: social mobility, research, and promoting public service."

The Webometrics Ranking of World Universities, which provides an assessment of the scholarly contents, visibility and impact of universities on the web, ranked SJSU No. 701 out of approximately 12,000 universities worldwide, and No. 200 out of approximately 3,200 U.S. colleges and universities (2022).

=== Undergraduate admissions ===
Undergraduate admission statistics
	Fall 2025	Fall 2024	Fall 2023	Fall 2022	Fall 2021
First-time freshmen
Applicants	37,968	37,813	36,536	34,783	30,441
Admits	29,845	31,419	28,708	26,083	25,682
Admit rate	79%	83%	79%	75%	84%
Enrolled	4,943	4,604	4,520	4,037	4,222
Yield rate	17%	15%	16%	15%	16%
Transfers
Applicants	11,733	11,504	10,880	12,458	14,337
Admits	7,662	8,036	7,806	8,720	10,120
Admit rate	65%	70%	72%	70%	71%
Enrolled	3,742	3,352	3,081	3,286	3,782
Yield rate	49%	42%	39%	38%	37%

Admission to SJSU is based on a combination of the applicant's high school cumulative grade point average (GPA) and standardized test scores. These factors are used to determine the applicant's California State University (CSU) eligibility index. More specifically, the eligibility index is a weighted combination of the applicant's high school grade point average during the final three years of high school and either the SAT or ACT score.

The CSU eligibility index is calculated by using either the SAT or ACT as follows: (Sum of SAT scores in mathematics and critical reading) + (800 x high school GPA) or (10 x ACT composite score without the writing score) + (200 x high school GPA).

In fall 2022, a total of 34,783 first-time, first-year (freshmen) applications were submitted, with 26,083 applicants accepted (75.0%) and 4,036 enrolling (15.5% of those accepted).

Among first-time, first-year (freshmen) students who enrolled in fall 2021, SAT scores for the middle 50.0% ranged from 1030 to 1310. ACT composite scores for the middle 50.0% ranged from 20 to 31. The average high school GPA for incoming freshmen was 3.54. Approximately 39.0% of all incoming freshmen had a high school GPA between 3.75 and 4.0. and 18% had an incoming average high school GPA of 4.0

In recent years, enrollment at SJSU has become impacted in all undergraduate majors, which means the university no longer has the enrollment capacity to accept all CSU-eligible applicants, including some from local high schools and community colleges. Although an applicant may meet the minimum CSU admission requirements, CSU-eligible applicants are no longer guaranteed admission.

=== Undergraduate graduation and retention ===
Among all first-time freshman students who enrolled at SJSU in fall 2017, 30% graduated within four years; 68% who enrolled in fall 2015 graduated within six years. Among new undergraduate transfer students who enrolled at SJSU in fall 2017, 33.0% graduated within two years, 69% graduated within three years, and 80.0% graduated within four years. Among first-time graduate students who enrolled at SJSU in fall 2017, 52.0% graduated within two years, 78% graduated within three years, and 83.0% graduated within four years.

The percentage of undergraduate students from the fall 2019 cohort returning in fall 2020 was 86.0% for full-time freshman students, 90.0% for new undergraduate transfer students, and 92.0% for first-time graduate students.

Previous commencement speakers have included former Speaker of the House Nancy Pelosi, journalist Kyra Phillips, entrepreneur Zain Zaidi, and civil rights activist Harry Edwards.

== Faculty and research ==
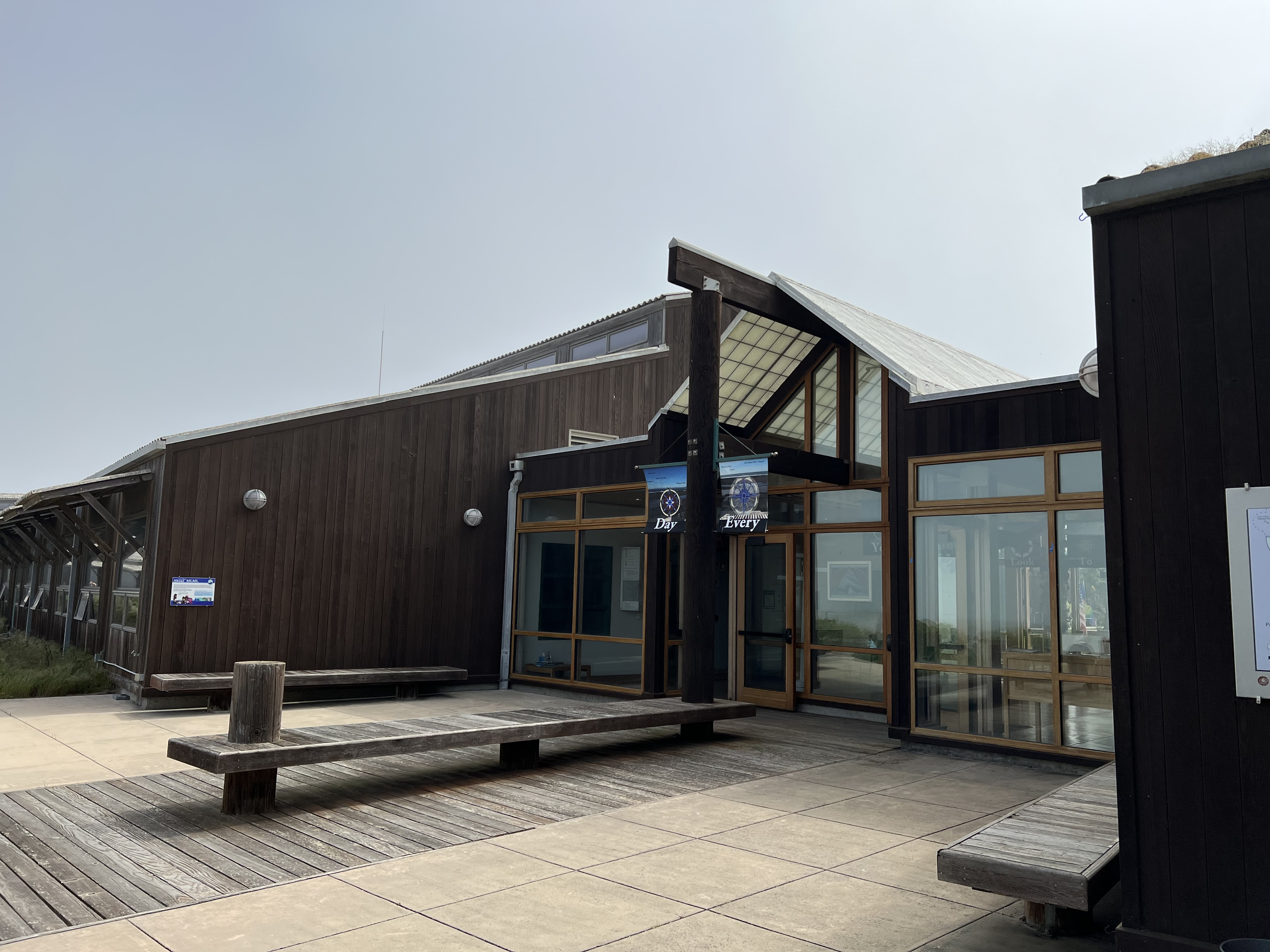
The Moss Landing Marine Laboratories

The university is classified among "R2: High Research Spending and Doctorate Production". As of the fall of 2024, San José State University employed 2,177 faculty, 1,300 of whom (or about 60%) were full-time or equivalent (FTEF).

According to National Science Foundation survey data, in 2023 San Jose State's research and development expenditures totaled $88.1 million, placing it second in total R&D expenditures out of all 23 California State University (CSU) campuses and No. 187 out of more than 900 colleges and universities nationwide.

Research collections located at SJSU include the Ira F. Brilliant Center for Beethoven Studies, the Martha Heasley Cox Center for Steinbeck Studies, the J. Gordon Edwards Entomology Museum and the Carl W. Sharsmith Herbarium.

SJSU research partnerships include the SJSU Metropolitan Technology Center at NASA Ames Research Center, Moffett Field, the Cisco Networking Laboratory, and the Moss Landing Marine Laboratories. SJSU is also home to the Mineta Transportation Institute.

Additionally, the university operates the Survey and Policy Research Institute (SPRI), which conducts the quarterly, high-profile California Consumer Confidence Survey and many other research projects.

SJSU is a member institution of the National Space Grant College and Fellowship Program.

Since 1979, the SJSU Department of Kinesiology operates the Timpany Center (located at 730 Empey Way), a non-profit therapeutic facility open to all and owned by the County of Santa Clara. The center is dedicated to the health and fitness of those with a disability or age-related concerns.

From 1989 to 2024, the SJSU Environmental Studies Department headquartered and operated the Center for the Development of Recycling, an environmental research and service organization.

On July 21, 2012, SJSU launched its first miniaturized satellite used for space research, TechEdSat, in a partnership with the NASA Ames Research Center.

Since 2014, SJSU has operated the Silicon Valley Big Data and Cybersecurity Center (BDCC). The center serves as a cybersecurity research and knowledge hub by creating multidisciplinary collaborations between faculty members from across the university and Silicon Valley tech companies.

== Air Force ROTC ==
Known academically as the Department of Aerospace Studies, SJSU's Detachment 045 is one of only two Air Force Reserve Officer Training Corps detachments in the San Francisco Bay Area. As such, Detachment 045 hosts "crosstown cadets" from other Bay Area schools including Santa Clara University, Stanford University and UC Santa Cruz. San Jose State students and crosstown cadets enrolled in the AFROTC program learn leadership skills and participate in a number of other mandatory activities leading to an active-duty U.S. military officer commission.

== Student life ==
Undergraduate demographics as of fall 2024
Race and ethnicity	Total
Asian	35.9%
Hispanic/Latino	29.6%
White	13.6%
Foreign national	7.9%
Two or more races	5.1%
Unknown	4.3%
Black or African American	3.3%
Native Hawaiian or Other Pacific Islander	.4%
American Indian or Alaskan Native	.1%
Economic diversity
Low-income (Note: The percentage of students who received an income-based federal Pell grant intended for low-income students.)	40%
Affluent (Note: The percentage of students who are a part of the American middle class at the bare minimum.)	60%

Student body origin (returning students)	Fall 2024
California: Santa Clara County	44.6%
California: Bay Area (outside Santa Clara County)	35.0%
California: Non-local	12.6%
International	6.8%
Other U.S.	0.9%

As the oldest and one of the largest universities in the CSU system, SJSU attracts students from California, the United States, and 100 countries around the world. As of the fall of 2022, 35,751 students were enrolled at SJSU including 26,863 undergraduate students and 8,888 graduate and credential students. Approximately 51% of students were male and 49% were female. Graduate student enrollment at SJSU was the highest of any campus in the CSU system.

As of the fall of 2022, the average age of undergraduate students at SJSU was 22.2. The average age of graduate students was 29.0, and the average age of credential students was 31.7.

Approximately 4,500 students (12.5%) live in campus housing and community impact studies show an estimated 5,000 more students live within easy walking or biking distance of the campus. Additionally, approximately 45% of all first-year (freshman) students live in campus residence facilities.

As of 2022, there were over 475 recognized student organizations at SJSU. These include academic and honorary organizations, cultural and religious organizations, special interest organizations, fraternities and sororities, and a wide variety of club sports organizations.

=== Fraternities and sororities ===
Fraternities and sororities have existed at SJSU since 1896. SJSU is home to 43 social fraternity and sorority chapters managed by Student Involvement. Greek life at SJSU comprises both social (NIC and NPC) and cultural (NPHC and USFC) organizations. Eighteen fraternities and sororities maintain chapter homes in the residential community east of campus along S. 10th and 11th streets, north of campus along San Fernando Street, and south of campus along San Salvador Street, S. 8th Street, and E. Reed Street, in downtown San Jose.

An additional 26 fraternities are co-ed and are either major-related, honors-related, or community service-related. The United Sorority and Fraternity Council (USFC) at San José State University was established in 2003. USFC is the coordinating body for the 17 cultural interest fraternities and sororities at SJSU. Approximately 6% of male students join social fraternities, and 6% of female students join social sororities.

=== Spartan Marching Band ===
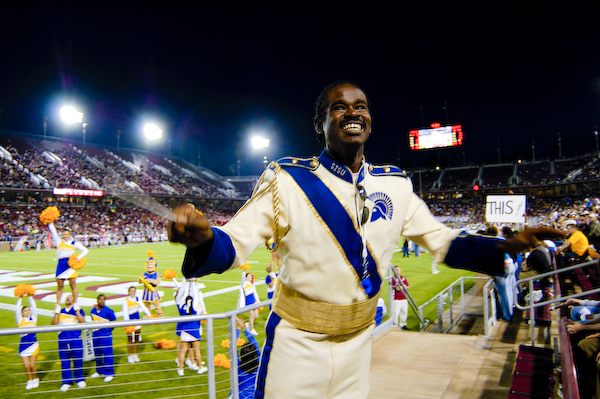
A student drum major conducts the Pride of the Spartans marching band during a football game at Stanford University.

The Spartan marching band comprises students from every field of study on campus, from first year undergraduates through graduate students, as well as several "open university" members. At each home football game, the Spartan marching band performs a completely new halftime show, plus a pre-game show and a post-game concert. The band reflects all the color and fanfare of major university sports pageantry. The band is unofficially known as "The Pride of the Spartans," and generally performs with a color guard and dance team. The band performs at all home football games, and also travels with the team for select road games.

=== Student press ===
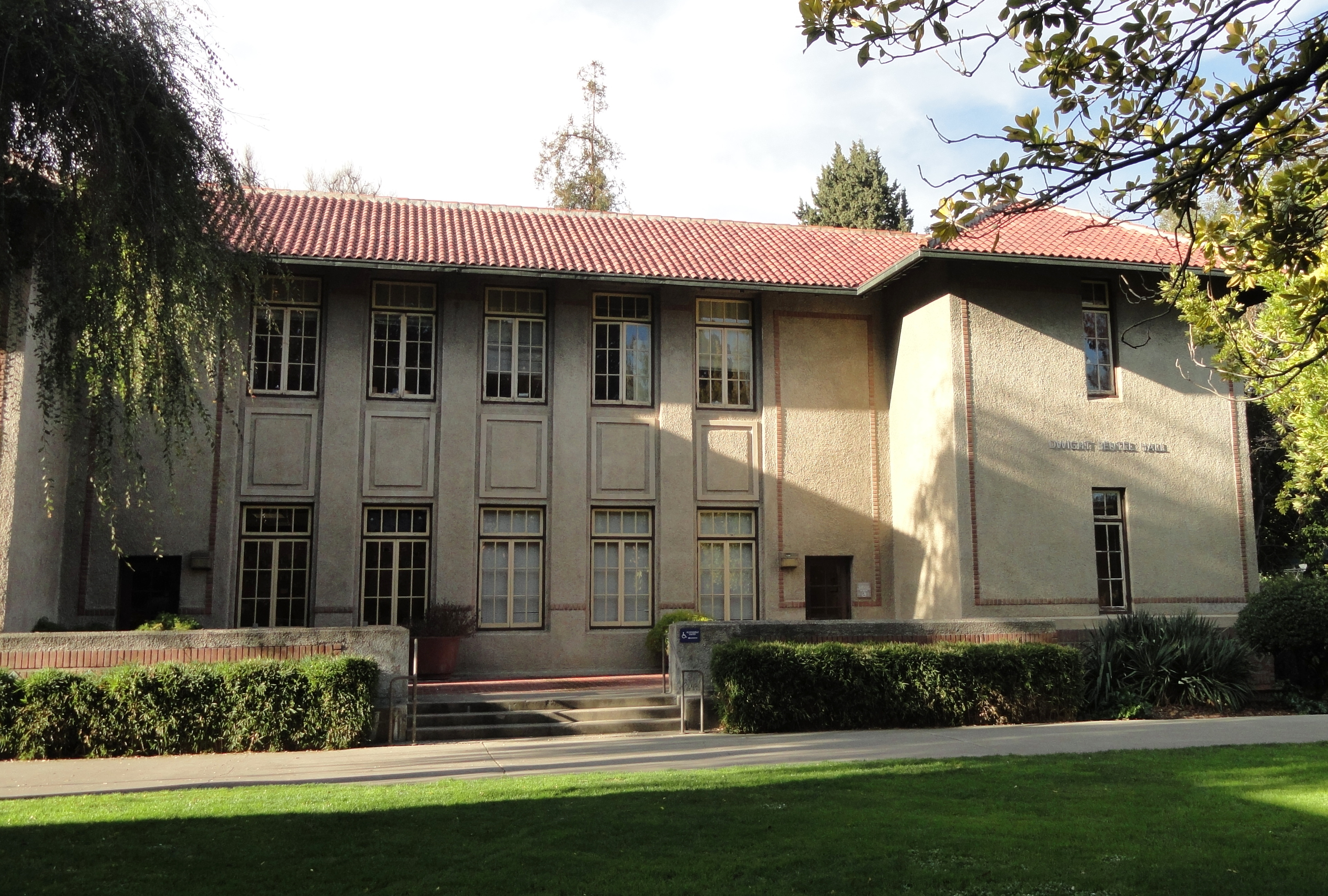
The Dwight Bentel Hall houses the School of Journalism and Mass Communications.

The school newspaper, The Spartan Daily, was founded in 1934 and is published three days a week when classes are in session. The publication follows a broadsheet format and has a daily print circulation of over 6,000, as well as a daily on-line edition. The newspaper is produced by journalism and advertising students enrolled in SJSU's School of Journalism and Mass Communications. The journalism school, including The Spartan Daily newsroom and other student press facilities, are housed inside Dwight Bentel Hall. The building was named after the department's founder and longtime chairman, Dwight Bentel. The journalism school also runs an on-campus advertising agency, Dwight, Bentel and Hall Communications.

Update News is a weekly, student-produced television newscast that airs every weekend on KICU, Channel 36 in San Jose. It is produced by San Jose State broadcast journalism students, and has aired in the Bay Area since 1982. The newscast previously aired on educational station KTEH. Update News is also streamed globally online.

Equal Time is a news magazine show produced by the San Jose State School of Journalism and Mass Communications. Each half-hour episode examines a different issue in depth, and ends with a roundtable discussion featuring professors and other experts in search of solutions. Equal Time airs on Saturday afternoons on KQED+ (Channel 54 or Comcast Channel 10) in the Bay Area.

Established in 1963, KSJS, 90.5 FM, is the university's student-run radio station. KSJS features live broadcasts of San Jose State athletic events, various types of music including electronic, urban, jazz, subversive rock, and rock en Español, as well as specialty talk shows.

=== Notable student organizations ===
W6YL is a student-run amateur radio station that has been in continuous operation for 98–99 years. Originally founded in 1927 when SJSU was still known as San Jose State Teachers College, SJSU Amateur Radio Club W6YL is recognized as one of the oldest continuously operating student organizations on campus. It is a federally licensed radio station that operates under the callsign W6YL on amateur radio bands.

== Athletics ==
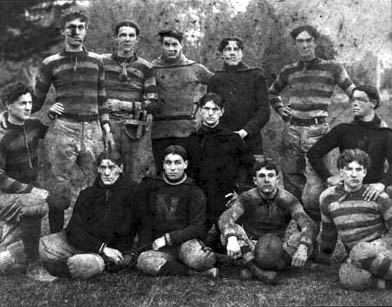
California State Normal School football (1910)

San José State University has participated in athletics since it first fielded a baseball team in 1890. SJSU sports teams are known as the Spartans, and compete in the Mountain West Conference (MWC) in NCAA Division I.

San José State University sports teams have won NCAA national titles in track and field, golf, boxing, fencing and tennis. As of December 2022, SJSU has won 10 NCAA national Division 1 team championships and produced 50 NCAA national Division 1 individual champions. SJSU also has achieved an international reputation for its judo program, winning 52 National Collegiate Judo Association (NCJA) men's team championship titles and 26 NCJA women's team championship titles between 1962 and 2024.

SJSU alumni have won 20 Olympic medals (including seven gold medals), dating back to the first gold medal won by Willie Steele in track and field in the 1948 Summer Olympics. Alumni also have won medals in swimming, judo, water polo and boxing. The track team coached by "Bud" Winter earned San Jose State the nickname "Speed City," and produced Olympic medalists and social activists Lee Evans, Tommie Smith and John Carlos. Smith and Carlos are perhaps best remembered for giving the raised fist salute from the medalist's podium during the 1968 Summer Olympics in Mexico City. In 2005, a monument of the protest was built on Tower Lawn, designed by artist Rigo 23 and titled Victory Salute, the monument encourages passerby's to recreate the historic moment. The track and field program was canceled in 1988 after a series of budget cuts and Title IX related decisions decimated the program. The program was reinstated in 2016.

After an 11-2 finish in 2012, SJSU's football team achieved its first-ever BCS ranking and first national ranking since 1990. SJSU was ranked No. 21 in both the 2012 post-season Associated Press Poll and the USA Today Coaches' Poll.

The Spartan football team had another breakout season in 2020, cracking the AP Poll top-25 for the first time since 2012 and appearing in the College Football Playoff ranking at No. 24. The team also won its first conference championship title since 1991. The Spartans finished the 2020 season 7-1 and ranked No. 24 in the AP Poll.

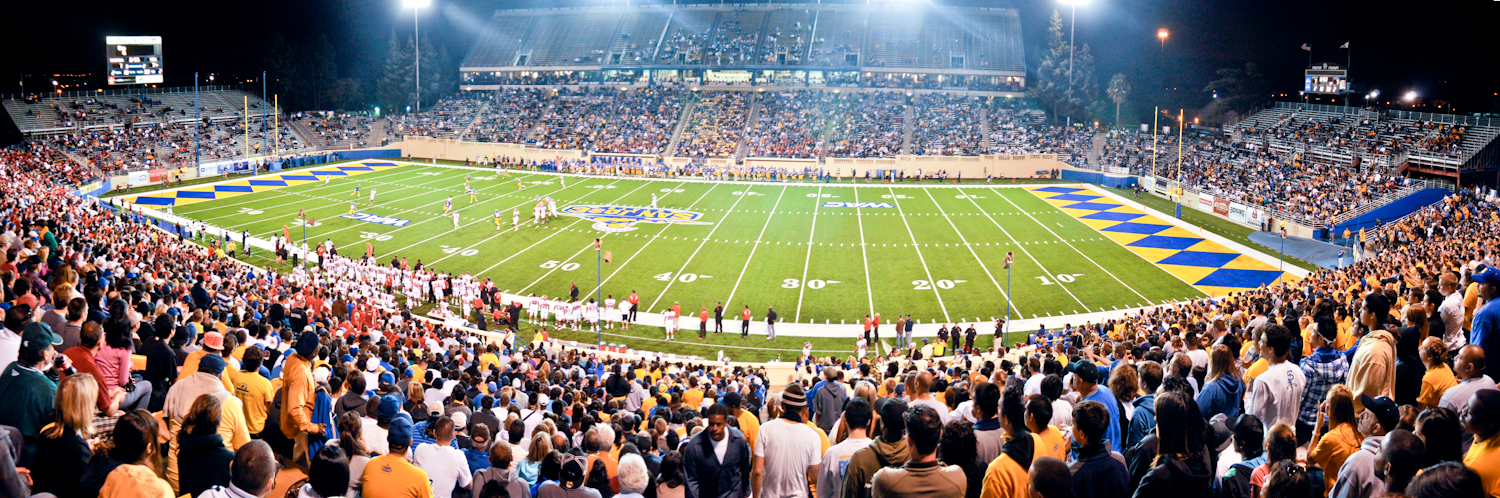
Utah vs. San Jose State at Spartan Stadium (2009)

=== Club sports ===
In addition to its various NCAA Division I sports programs, San José State University has a very active club sports community consisting of approximately 25 sports and 50 teams. Many of the club sports teams are run and organized by students, although some of the more established teams employ full-time paid coaches and enjoy strong alumni support. The list of club sports active at SJSU includes men's and women's archery, men's and women's badminton, baseball, men's and women's basketball, men's and women's bowling, men's and women's boxing, men's and women's cycling, dancesport, men's and women's dragon boat racing, esports, men's and women's fencing, men's and women's figure skating, men's and women's gymnastics, ACHA Division II and Division lll men's ice hockey, women's ice hockey, men's and women's judo, MCLA Division II men's lacrosse, women's lacrosse, mountain biking, men's and women's powerlifting, men's and women's quidditch, men's roller hockey, men's and women's rugby, salsa, men's and women's soccer, softball, men's and women's swimming, track and field, triathlon, ultimate Frisbee, men's and women's volleyball, men's and women's water polo, and men's and women's wrestling.

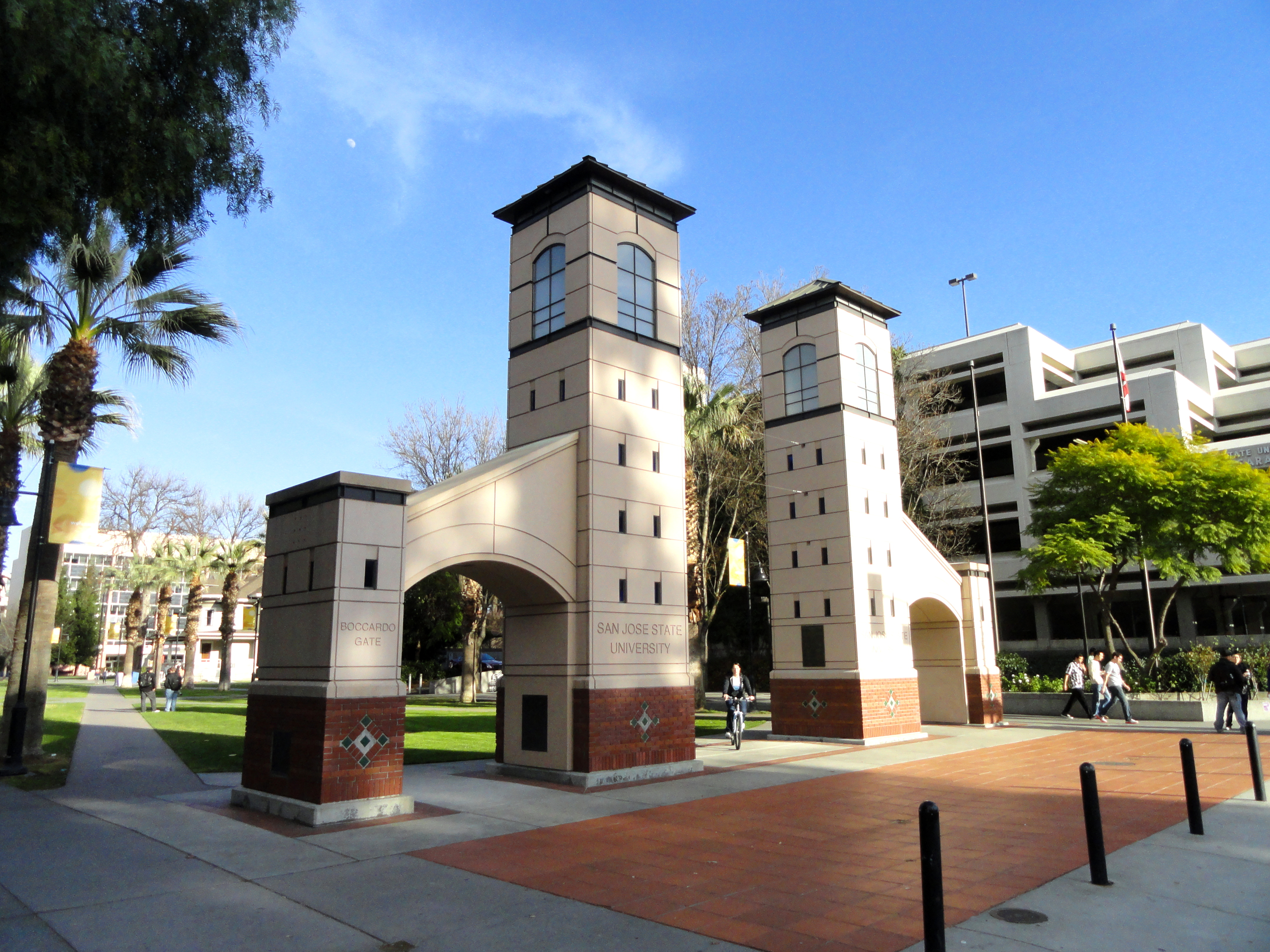
The Boccardo Gate on the Paseo de San Carlos

=== Traditions ===
The old campus bell, which was originally located in a small tower to the right of the main entrance to the campus, was purchased and installed in 1881 at a cost of $1,217. The bell chimed each morning at eight o'clock until the 1906 San Francisco earthquake stilled its voice. When Tower Hall was constructed in 1909, it was specially designed to house the old bell. The bell rang on special occasions until the college obtained new carillon chimes in 1946. The old bell is displayed to this day on the Washington Square quad near Tower Hall.

In 1922, the State Teachers College at San Jose adopted the Spartans as the school's official mascot and nickname. Mascots and nicknames prior to 1922 included the Daniels, the Teachers, the Pedagogues, the Normals and the Normalites.

In 1925, students debated whether to change the school colors from gold and white to purple and white. Tradition won out, and the students decided to keep the original colors, gold and white. At some point prior to 1929 when the SJSU alma mater was officially adopted, blue was added as an official school color alongside gold and white.

According to the old SJSU La Torre yearbook, Spardi Gras was first held in 1929 on George Washington's birthday. Spardi Gras was described in the 1929 edition of La Torre as "[an] event which met with unprecedented participance by the entire student body ... a gala occasion of play, sport, and merrymaking later authorized by the Executive Board as an annual event because of its great success." Spardi Gras was last mentioned in La Torre in 1960.

Another longstanding event at SJSU was "Spartan Revelries." According to the 1960 edition of La Torre, Spartan Revelries was an "all-student college musical event written, produced and presented entirely by students." It is unclear when Spartan Revelries began, but some believe it started in 1929 as a grand finale to Spardi Gras. In 1949, an official Revelries board was established to carry out the business and management of each year's show, which had grown into a major annual event requiring the efforts of many students and several months of preparation.

Sparta Camp was an annual event held between 1953 and 1965. The retreat was hosted by the Associated Students and was held every spring at the Asilomar State Beach. The event was open to all students with an interest in student government, and students had to apply to go. Participants attended workshops and discussion groups on leadership. A similar event known as Freshman Camp was also held at Asilomar every September to help new students get oriented to the campus and the "Spirit of Sparta."

The chimes heard on the SJSU campus each quarter hour are Westminster chimes, which were a gift from the class of 1947. They ring the same tones as the famous Big Ben chimes in England. Students and alumni show their Spartan pride every Thursday by wearing Spartan blue and gold. Each year during homecoming week, SJSU hosts a series of events leading up to the homecoming football game at CEFCU Stadium. Events include the Campus MovieFest Finale and Fire on the Fountain festival.

=== Alma mater ===
"Hail! Spartans, Hail!" is the university's official alma mater. The lyrics were written by Gerald Erwin, a 1933 graduate. Erwin was a music major who also served as the student director of the glee club. The song was officially adopted as the school hymn on February 25, 1929. Whenever the SJSU Alma Mater is played, students are asked to stand, remove their hats and sing along.

The university also has a fight song, which is typically played and/or sung at the end of football games and other athletic events including pep rallies.

== Notable alumni ==
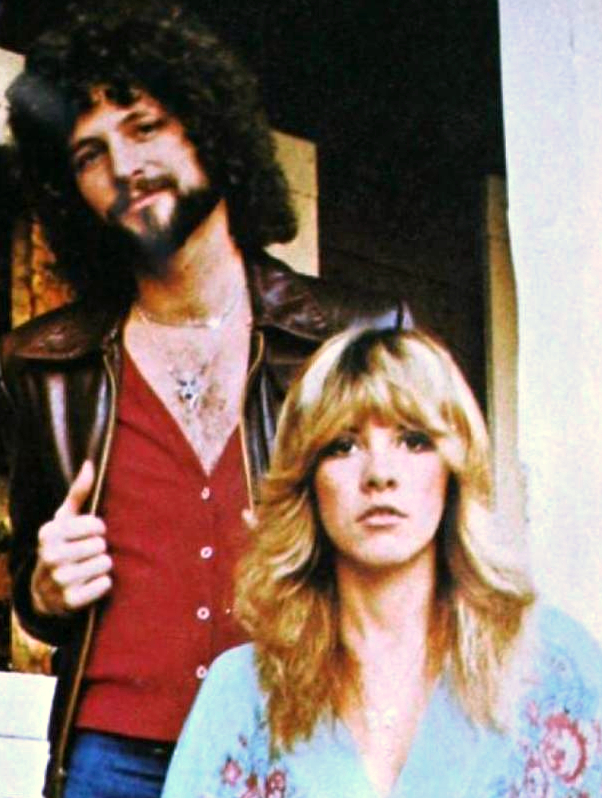
Lindsey Buckingham (left)
(attended '68-'70) and Stevie Nicks (right)
(attended '68-'70)
Musicians best known for Fleetwood Mac

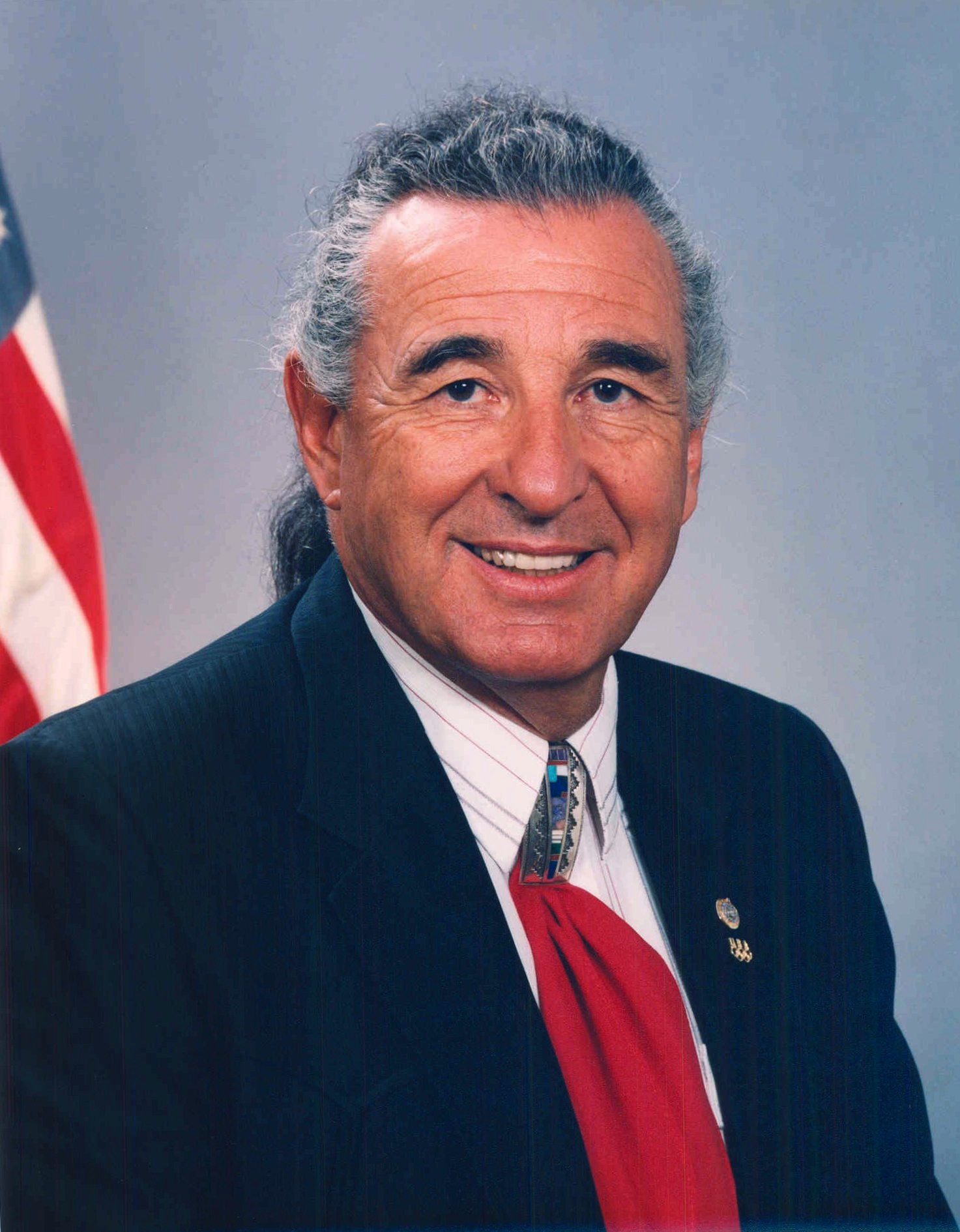
Ben Nighthorse Campbell
(B.A., '57)
First Native American to be elected to the United States Senate and member of the first US Olympic judo team

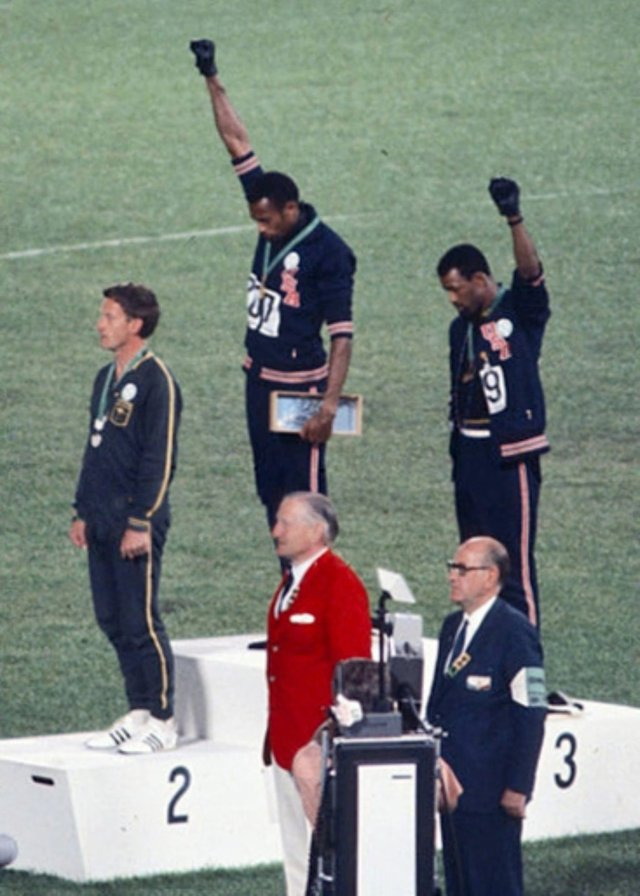
John Carlos (right)
(attended '68-'69)
and Tommie Smith (center) (B.A., '69)
Track and field athletes known for a 1968 protest

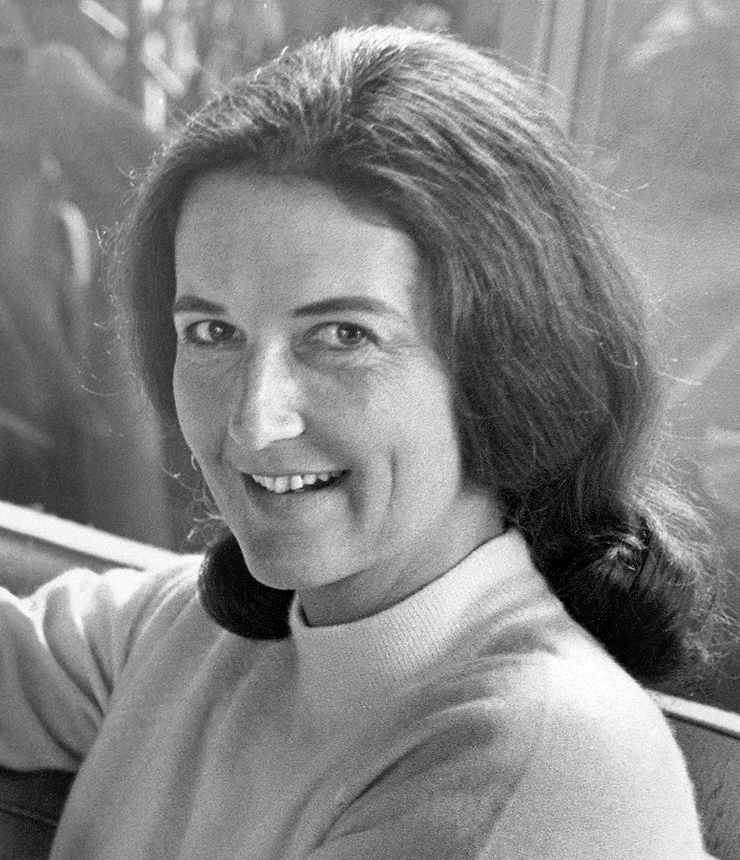
Dian Fossey
(B.S., '54)
Primatologist and conservationist known for studying mountain gorilla groups as a member of the Trimates

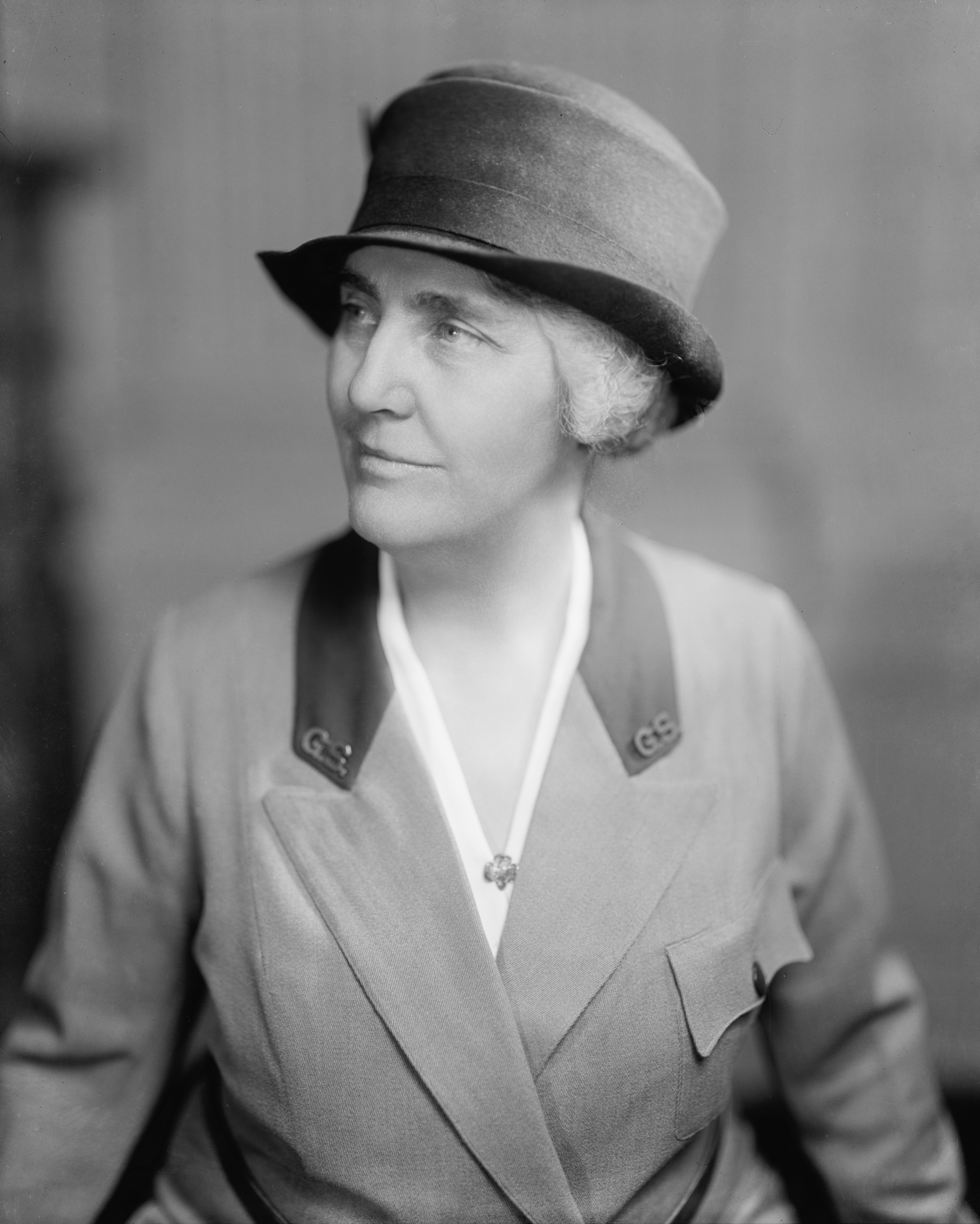
Lou Henry Hoover
(DipEd, 1893)
Philanthropist and former First Lady of the United States

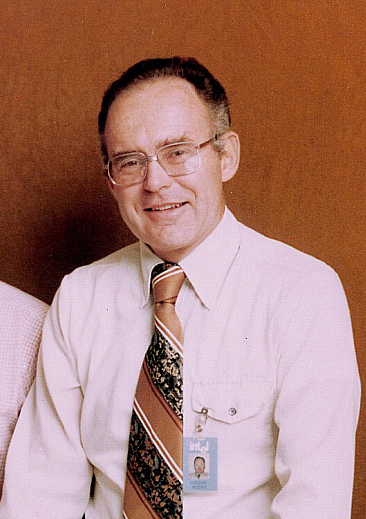
Gordon Moore
(attended '46-'47)
Founder of the Intel Corporation and creator of "Moore's law"

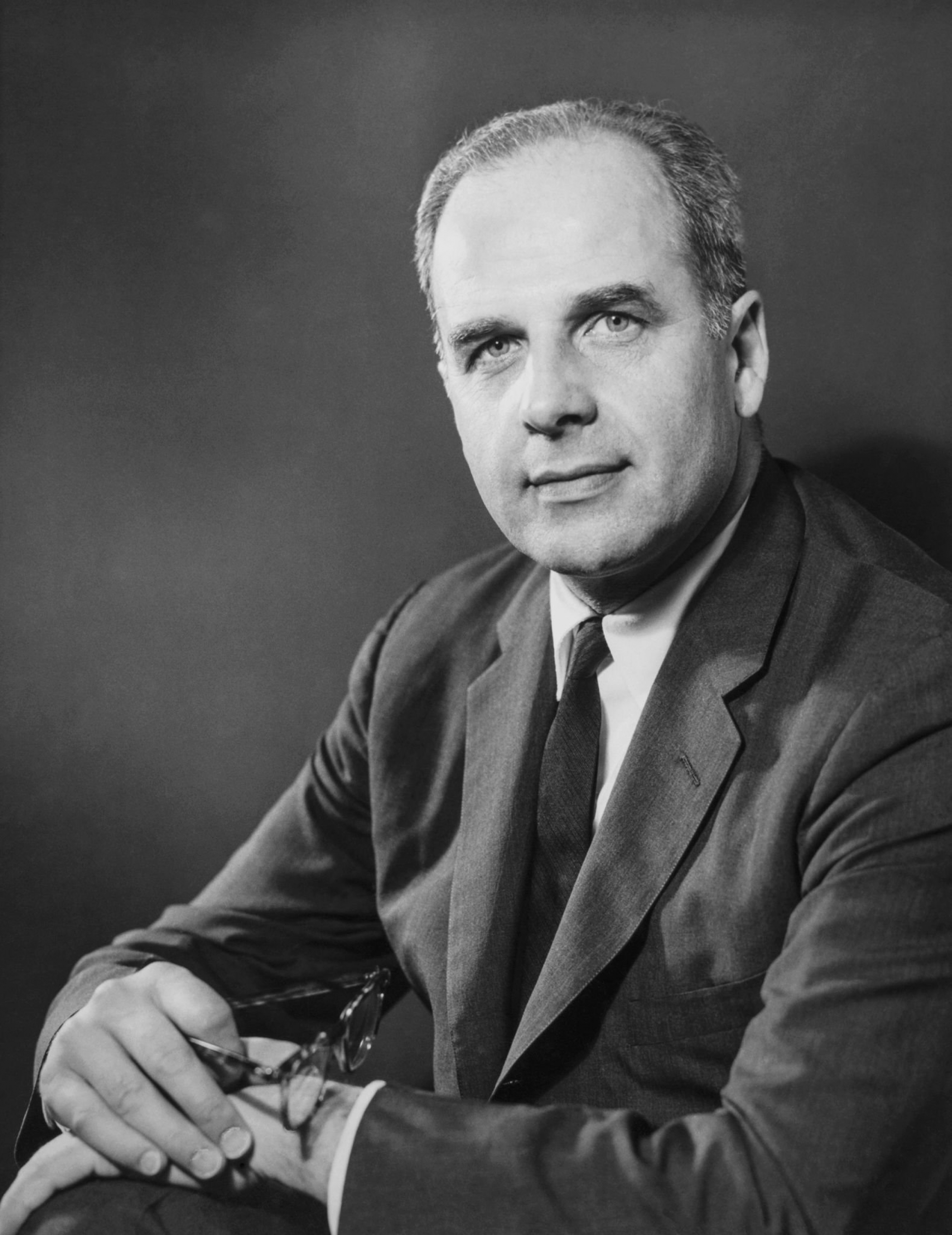
Gaylord Nelson
(B.A., '39)
Governor of Wisconsin and founder of Earth Day

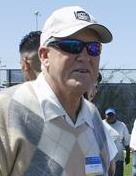
Bill Walsh
(B.A, '55)
Football coach in the Pro Football Hall of Fame and three-time Super Bowl champion

About 60% of San Jose State's 275,000 living alumni of record reside in the San Francisco Bay Area. The other 40% are scattered around the globe, with concentrations in Southern California, Seattle, Portland, Philadelphia, Washington, D.C., and New York City.

SJSU is consistently listed among the leading suppliers of undergraduate and graduate alumni to Silicon Valley science and technology firms. In 2015, San José State University was listed as the top feeder school for Apple Inc., which employed over 1,000 SJSU graduates at the time. SJSU ranked 9th on the list of top feeder schools for Facebook.

Some of the more notable SJSU alumni in science and engineering include Ray Dolby, founder of Dolby sound systems; Dian Fossey, primatologist and gorilla researcher; Gordon Moore, founder of Intel Corporation and creator of "Moore's law;" and Ed Oates, co-founder of Oracle.

Nearly 200 former SJSU students and graduates have founded, co-founded, served or serve as senior executives or officers of public and private companies reporting annual sales between $40 million and $26 billion. This list includes former Intel Corporation CEO, Brian Krzanich, and current Crown Worldwide Group CEO, billionaire James E. Thompson.

Notable companies founded by SJSU students and alumni include Dolby Laboratories (1965), Intel Corporation (1968), Specialized Bicycle Components (1974), Oracle Corporation (1977), Seagate Technology (1979) and WhatsApp (2008).

Musicians Doug Clifford and Stu Cook (Creedence Clearwater Revival), Tom Johnston and Patrick Simmons (the Doobie Brothers), Lindsey Buckingham and Stevie Nicks (Fleetwood Mac) and Paul Kantner (Jefferson Airplane) all attended San Jose State.

SJSU distinguished alumni also include former first Lady of the United States, Lou Henry Hoover, novelists Amy Tan and Jayne Ann Krentz, fashion designer Jessica McClintock, and competitive eater Joey Chestnut.

SJSU alumni Dick Vermeil and Bill Walsh earned a combined four Super Bowl victories as NFL head coaches.

San Jose State alumnus and 1964 U.S. Open winner Ken Venturi was named Sports Illustrated's "Sportsman of the Year", and was later inducted into the World Golf Hall of Fame.

== See also ==
- California Master Plan for Higher Education
- Education in California
- List of American state universities

== Bibliography ==
- Gilbert, Benjamin Franklin (1957). Pioneers for One Hundred Years: San Jose State College, 1857-1957 (1st ed.). ISBN 9781258343118.
