= Munns =

Munns is a surname. Notable people with this surname include:

- Charles L. Munns (born 1950), American navy officer
- George Munns (1877–1954), New Zealand politician
- Jack Munns (born 1993), English football player
- Les Munns (1908–1997), American baseball player
- Luke Munns (born 1980), Australian musician with Hillsong United
- Margaret Cairns Munns (1870–1957), American teacher temperance activist
- Rana Ellen Munns, Australian botanist
- Ray Munns (born 1980), American DJ

== See also ==
- Munn
- Munnings
