= Paul Yu =

Chinese–American academic

- 余英华

25th President of San José State University
- In office July 15, 2004 – August 1, 2004
- Preceded by: Joseph N. Crowley
- Succeeded by: Don W. Kassing

17th President of State University of New York Brockport
- In office July, 1997 – May 3, 2004
- Preceded by: John E. Van de Wetering
- Succeeded by: John B. Clark

Personal details
- Born: 1940 or 1941 Chongqing, China
- Died: December 5, 2016 (aged 75)
- Relatives: Yu Ying-shih (elder brother)
- Education: University of Michigan (BA, MA, PhD)

Paul Yu (simplified Chinese: 余英华; traditional Chinese: 余英華) was a Chinese-American academic who was the President of State University of New York at Brockport (SUNY Brockport) between 1997–2004.

== Early life and education ==
Born in Chongqing, China, Yu moved with his family to Hong Kong in 1949 before resettling in Michigan. Yu went on to receive bachelor's, master's, and a doctorate in philosophy all from the University of Michigan.

He was the younger brother of Yu Ying-shih.

== Academic career ==
A scholar in philosophy of language and philosophy of mind, Yu was a philosophy professor at Central Michigan University from 1969 to 1980. In the 1980-81 academic year, he was a Fulbright lecturer at the National Taiwan University. Yu returned to Central Michigan University in 1981 as chair of the philosophy department and served in that capacity until 1987, when he moved up to associate dean of the College of Arts and Sciences at Central Michigan.

From 1989 to 1991, Yu served as dean of the College of Liberal Arts and Sciences at Butler University in Indianapolis, Indiana. Yu then became vice president of academic affairs in the 1991–92 school year, then was provost and senior vice president of academic affairs from 1992 to 1997.

Yu served as external evaluator for the Chinese University of Hong Kong, National Taiwan University, and the National Science Council of the Republic of China. From 1988 to 1989, Yu served on the Michigan Council for the Humanities from 1988 to 1989. In 1990, Yu was visiting scholar at the Chinese Academy of Social Sciences (CASS) in Beijing, under the Visiting Scholars Exchange Program (VSEP) sponsored by the United States National Academy of Sciences. He also joined the Board of Directors of the American Association of University Administrators (AAUA) in 1998.

=== President of SUNY Brockport (1997–2004) ===
From July 1997 to May 3, 2004, Yu was president of SUNY Brockport.

During his presidency, SUNY Brockport rose to Tier 2 within the State University of New York system. He also established the Presidential Scholarship program which attracted several top international students to the SUNY Brockport campus.

=== President of San Jose State University (2004) ===
On April 20, 2004, the California State University Board of Trustees named Yu as President of San Jose State University, effective July 15. On August 1, just three weeks after taking office, Yu resigned from San Jose State for health reasons. He returned with his family to New York and took a position with SUNY Brockport.

== Death ==
Yu died on December 5, 2016, at the age of 75 after battling Parkinson's disease.

Academic offices
Preceded by John E. Van de Wetering	President of the State University of New York at Brockport; 1997–2004	Succeeded by John B. Clark (interim)
