= Don Kassing =

Don W. Kassing
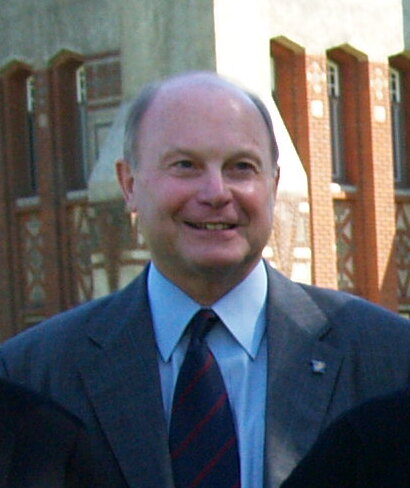
- Kassing in 2007

26th President of San José State University
- In office May 2005 – June 2008
- Preceded by: Self (as interim president)
- Succeeded by: Jon Whitmore

Interim President of San José State University
- In office August 2010 – July 2011
- Preceded by: Jon Whitmore
- Succeeded by: Mohammad Qayoumi
- In office August 2004 – April 2005
- Preceded by: Paul Yu
- Succeeded by: Self (as president)

Personal details
- Born: October 8, 1941 (age 84) Saint Louis, Missouri, U.S.
- Education: Saint Louis University (BS, MBA)

Don William Kassing (born October 8, 1941) is an American academic and university administrator at San Jose State University.

== Education and early career ==
Don W. Kassing was born in Saint Louis, Missouri, on October 8, 1941. He graduated from Christian Brothers College High School in 1959, before attending Saint Louis University, where he earned a BS and an MBA in Economics. He worked briefly for General Motors and the Brown Shoe Company before becoming a faculty member and president of Southwestern Illinois College's Granite City Campus. After his departure in 1986, he worked as the Vice President of public affairs for Western Colorado University until 1991, and as the Vice President of external affairs for Murray State University until 1993.

== Career ==
Kassing joined San Jose State University in 1993 as the Vice President for Administration. In July 2004, president Paul Yu resigned after only two weeks in the position, which Kassing was then appointed to fulfill on an interim basis. Initially, Kassing had intended to only serve up to two years as interim president, however after only one academic year in the role, he was fully promoted to be the university's president. While in office, Kassing oversaw the early years of the Dr. Martin Luther King Jr. Library, and the construction of the Campus Village, and the Victory Salute monument on campus. He was additionally lauded for his fundraising capabilities, raising a record breaking $100 million over his tenure, which earned the University a WealthEngine Award issued by the Council for Advancement and Support of Education.

Kassing retired as president in June 2008, as a part of his retirement ceremony, Kassing was issued an honorary doctorate by the university. Kassing then retired with his family to Anthem, Arizona, his successor to the role was Jon Whitmore.

In 2010, after two years as the president, Jon Whitmore resigned from the presidency in order to accept a job as the CEO of ACT Inc., Kassing was then asked to come out of retirement to serve as the Interim President until a search for a new president could be completed. He served his second term as interim president from August 2010 to July 2011.

In October 2010, Kassing publicly launched SJSU's first-ever comprehensive capital fundraising campaign dubbed "Acceleration: the Campaign for San Jose State University." The original goal of the multi-year campaign was to raise $150 million but was later increased to $200 million because of the rapid success of the campaign. The campaign would eventually exceed its goal one year earlier than anticipated, raising more than $208 million by 2013.
