= Munnings =

Munnings is a surname which may refer to:

- Sir Alfred Munnings (1878–1959), English painter
- Catie Munnings (born 1997), British rally driver
- Clare Munnings, pen-name of two American mystery authors
- Frederick Tansley Munnings (born 1875), British spiritualist medium and former burglar, exposed as a fraud
- Tim Munnings (born 1966), Bahamian athlete
