= Ruddy Muddy =

English graffiti artist

Rick Minns, known as Ruddy Muddy is a graffiti artist who creates artworks by selectively wiping dirt off dirty vans.

Minns is a van driver from Wymondham, Norfolk who draws designs on muddy and dirty vans, in a technique he describes as "graffilthy"

Subjects commemorated or referenced in his work have included Stephen Hawking, Albert Einstein, Prince Harry, Megan Markle, the Mona Lisa, Theresa May, Jeremy Corbyn, Bruce Forsyth, Ken Dodd, John Lennon, The Hulk, Take That, Corrie McKeague, Deadpool, X-wing fighter aircraft, Yoda, Boba Fett, Frozen, Logan (Wolverine), Ed Sheeran, Lenny Henry, James Corden, Red Nose Day, Fast and Furious 8, the NHS, Alex Neil, Nick McCarthy, George Clooney, Batman, Daniel Craig, Conrad's Coastal Challenge, Bradley Lowery, Game of Thrones, Chester Bennington, Winnie-the-Pooh, Kim Kardashian, Capital FM and many others.

Minns started drawing on vans in about 2007. His initial reason was to obscure rude words written on the vans so that his children would not see them. His early subjects were mountain scenes, and he got more artistic as time went on. His technique started off using his finger or a tissue or cotton bud on the dirty parts of the vans but he now also uses a brush, and sprays the vans with a secret mud recipe.

Minns took A-level Art courses at Wymondham college, and later studied particle physics and Cosmology at Swansea University.

In recent years Minns has started to seek sponsorship for his work, and has raised significant sums for charities.

Minns is an established artist in other mediums including oils, pencil and acrylics. He has also been in the Guinness Book of World Records for the largest amount of paint brushes in a beard.
