= George W. Minns =

American educator

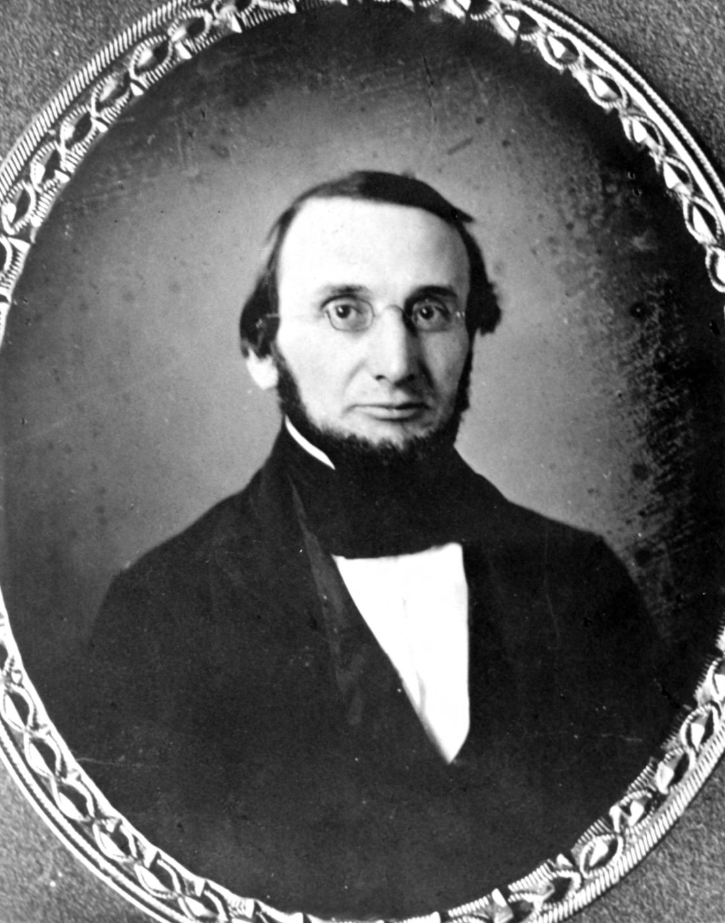

1st Principal of San José State University
- In office 1865–1866
- Preceded by: Ahira Holmes
- Succeeded by: Henry P. Carlton
- In office 1857–1862
- Succeeded by: Ahira Holmes

Personal details
- Born: October 6, 1813 Boston, Massachusetts, U.S.
- Died: January 14, 1895 (aged 81) Brookline, Massachusetts, U.S.
- Education: Harvard University

George Washington Minns (October 6, 1813 – January 14, 1895) was an American educator. He graduated from Harvard Law School and practised law in Massachusetts for several years before moving to California. After the collapse of his law practice, Minns became an educator. He helped train teachers for San Francisco's public school system as the principal of Minns Evening Normal School, the predecessor of the California State Normal School, which, in turn, became San José State University, the founding campus of the California State University system.

== Early life and education ==
Minns was born on October 6, 1813 in Boston, Massachusetts. His father, Thomas, was a publisher for a New England newspaper called The New England Palladium. As a young man, Minns was awarded a Franklin Medal, which allowed him to sit in with and learn from city officials at nearby Faneuil Hall. In 1831, Minns enrolled at Harvard University, however, after an incident that resulted in an explosion in a student dorm as well as frequent absences from class, he was suspended for two years, restarting his education in 1834. While at Harvard, he became lifelong friends with classmate James Russell Lowell. In 1836 he graduated from Harvard and immediately began pursuing an LL.B. degree from Dane Law School (now Harvard Law School), he graduated in 1840.

== Early career and move to California ==
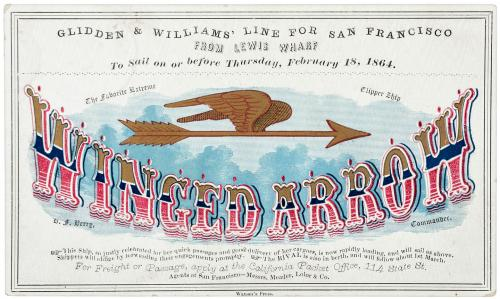
A sailing card of the Winged Arrow, the clipper ship that transported Minns to California in 1854.

After studying under Rufus Choate, Minns passed the Suffolk County bar exam on July 13, 1841. Minns practiced law in Boston for thirteen years, before deciding to move to California in 1854, sailing around Cape Horn aboard the clipper ship Winged Arrow. He arrived in San Francisco on February 8, 1855 and attempted to restart his law practice. However after the collapse of his bank, the Page, Bacon & Co., in 1855, Minns lost his savings and closed his new practice. Seeking a steady income, Minns accepted a position as a natural sciences teacher at the Union Grammar School (now Lowell High School).

== Minns Evening Normal School ==
After a private normal school closed in San Francisco after only one year, politicians John Swett and Henry B. Janes sought to establish a normal school for the city's public school system, and approached Minns to be the principal for the nascent institution, with Swett as its assistant principal. The normal school began operations in 1857 and became known as the Minns Evening Normal School. Classes were only held once a week, and only graduated 54 students across its existence. However, the program proved to be enough of a success for increased funding to be approved.

In 1861, after the continued success of the Evening School, superintendent Andrew J. Moulder requested that a committee be formed to create a report on the merits of fully funding a state normal school. Minns was one of several Evening School teachers appointed to the committee, which presented its report to the California State Legislator in January 1862. In May 1862, the California State Senate adopted a statue to fund an initial $3,000 (roughly $93,000 in 2024) for a state normal school and to appoint a board of trustees for the school.

After the board of trustees was formed, it was expected that Minns would be appointed principal, in line with his function at the Evening School. However, in its first meeting, the board decided to allow other applicants to apply, and ultimately chose to appoint Evening School teacher Ahira Holmes to the position.

== California State Normal School ==
After Minns was passed up for the principalship of the California State Normal School, he continued to be a teacher at the Union Grammar School. During this period, he was also elected president of the California Educational Society. He eventually was promoted to be the principal of the Boys' section of the Union Grammar School, but would only serve in that role for a year before being approached to be the principal of the State Normal School after the resignation of Ahira Holmes. Minns purportedly did not want to accept the position, but did anyways at the insistence of John Swett. In his second term, Minns focused on decreasing the cost of attendance.

== Later career & death ==
After a year as principal of the State Normal school, Minns surreptitiously returned to Boston. While he initially claimed it was a five-month sabbatical and assigned Henry P. Carlton to be the acting president, he decided to permanently stay on the east coast, and Carlton assumed the full principalship. Over the course of 14 years after his move he taught classes for the Eagleswood Military Academy in New Jersey, Washington University in Missouri, and Boys Latin high school (now Boston Latin School). In 1869 in Boston, Minns founded the Scientific, Classical, and Commercial School for Boys, although it's unclear how long it remained in operation.

In 1880, again at the insistence of John Swett, Minns returned to California to be the Principal of the Union Grammar School, though this time he led the Girl's section. He remained at the Union Grammar School until 1888 before retiring back to the east coast.

Minns died on January 14, 1895 at the age of 81 in Brookline, Massachusetts.
