= Mary Papazian =

American university president

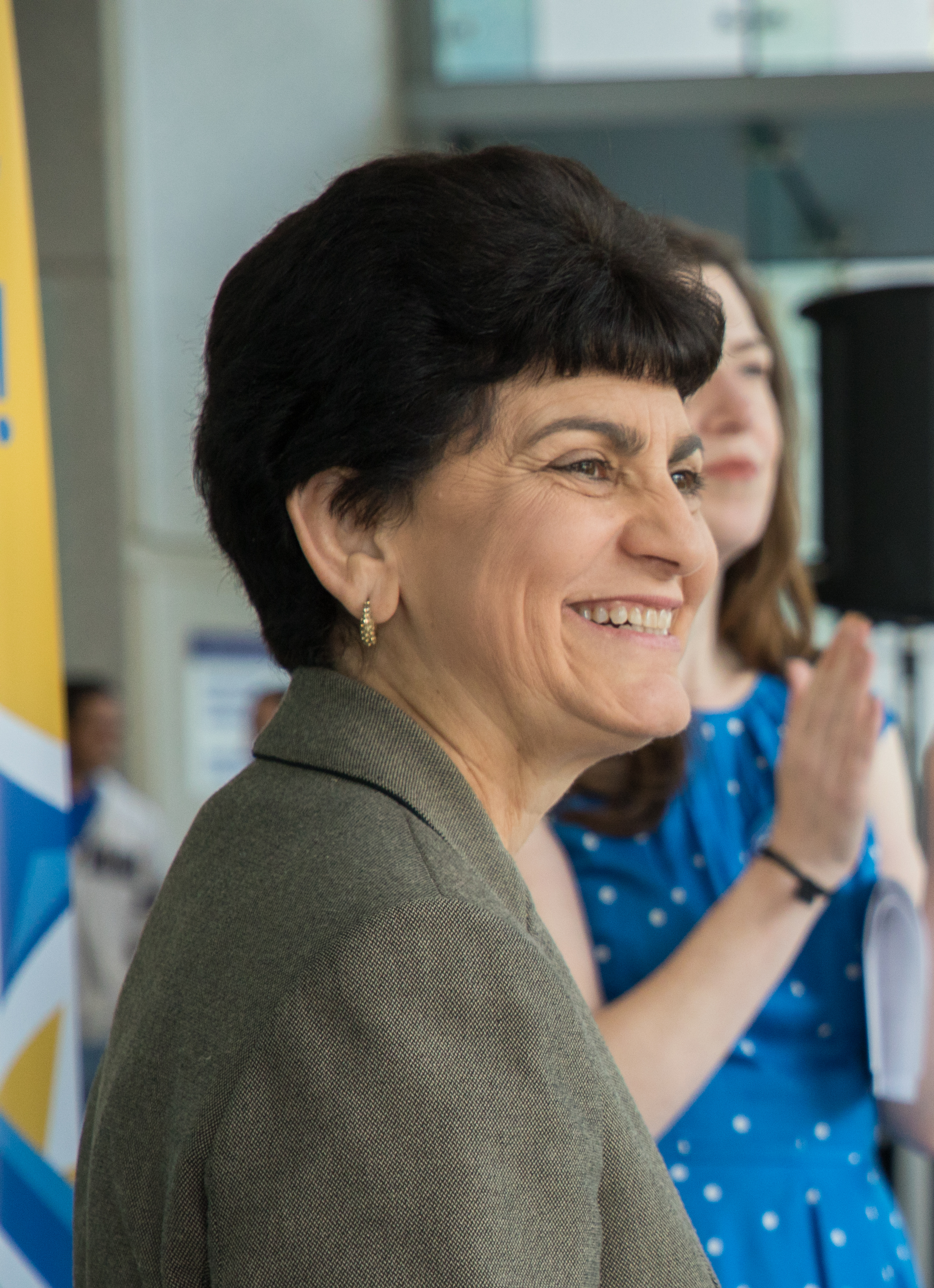
- Papazian at the King Library's 15th Anniversary in 2018

30th President of San Jose State University
- In office July 1, 2016 – December 21, 2021
- Preceded by: Susan Martin
- Succeeded by: Stephen Perez

11th President of Southern Connecticut State University
- In office February 1, 2012 – June 30, 2016
- Preceded by: Stanley Battle
- Succeeded by: Joe Bertolino

Personal details
- Born: Mary Ellen Arshagouni; February 25, 1959 (age 67) Santa Monica, California, U.S.
- Spouse: Dennis Papazian (m. 1991; died 2023)
- Children: 2
- Education: Ph.D in English literature
- Alma mater: University of California, Los Angeles (BA, MA, PhD)

Mary Arshagouni Papazian (born Mary Ellen Arshagouni; February 25, 1959) is the former president of San Jose State University. She has had over 25 years of prior experience in academia, having been the past president of Southern Connecticut State University and the Provost and Senior Vice President for Academic Affairs at Lehman College. She resigned from her post in 2021.

== Early life and education ==
Papazian was born Mary Ellen Arshagouni to a family of Armenian descent in Santa Monica, California on February 25, 1959. Raised in the San Fernando Valley, she attended Ferrahian High School, an Armenian private school in Encino.

Papazian has a B.A. (1981), M.A. (1983), and Ph.D. (1988) in English literature from University of California, Los Angeles (UCLA).

== Career ==
Papazian started out as an assistant, associate and tenured professor of English at Oakland University. After her teaching career, she continued her work in education. From 1999 to 2004, she was associate dean of the College of Arts and Sciences at Oakland University in Michigan and was also executive director of the department of music, theater, and dance at Oakland from 2003 to 2004. She then served as dean of the College of Humanities and Social Sciences at Montclair State University in New Jersey from 2004 to 2007. Papazian was provost and senior vice president for academic affairs at Lehman College, City University of New York from 2007 to 2011.

From February 1, 2012, to June 30, 2016, Papazian was president of Southern Connecticut State University.

On January 27, 2016, the California State University Board of Trustees named Papazian the 30th president of San Jose State University, beginning July 1.

On October 7, 2021, Papazian announced that she would resign as the president of San José State University at the end of the 2021 fall semester. The resignation came after the U.S. Department of Justice investigated San Jose State for a sex abuse scandal where the school failed for more than a decade to adequately respond to reports of sexual abuse by its former director of sports medicine.

== Research and academic interests ==
Papazian's dissertation at UCLA was titled John Donne's "Devotions upon Emergent Occasions": A Puritan Reading. She has edited two books, John Donne and the Protestant Reformation and Sacred and Profane in English Renaissance Literature as well as numerous articles on Donne.

== Works ==
- John Donne and the Protestant Reformation (Wayne State UP, 2003), editor
- Sacred and Profane in English Renaissance Literature (U of Delaware P, 2008), editor

== Personal life ==
She married Dennis Papazian in 1991; they have two daughters. Dennis Papazian died on March 16, 2023.
