= Main San José Carnegie Library =

Carnegie library in California, US

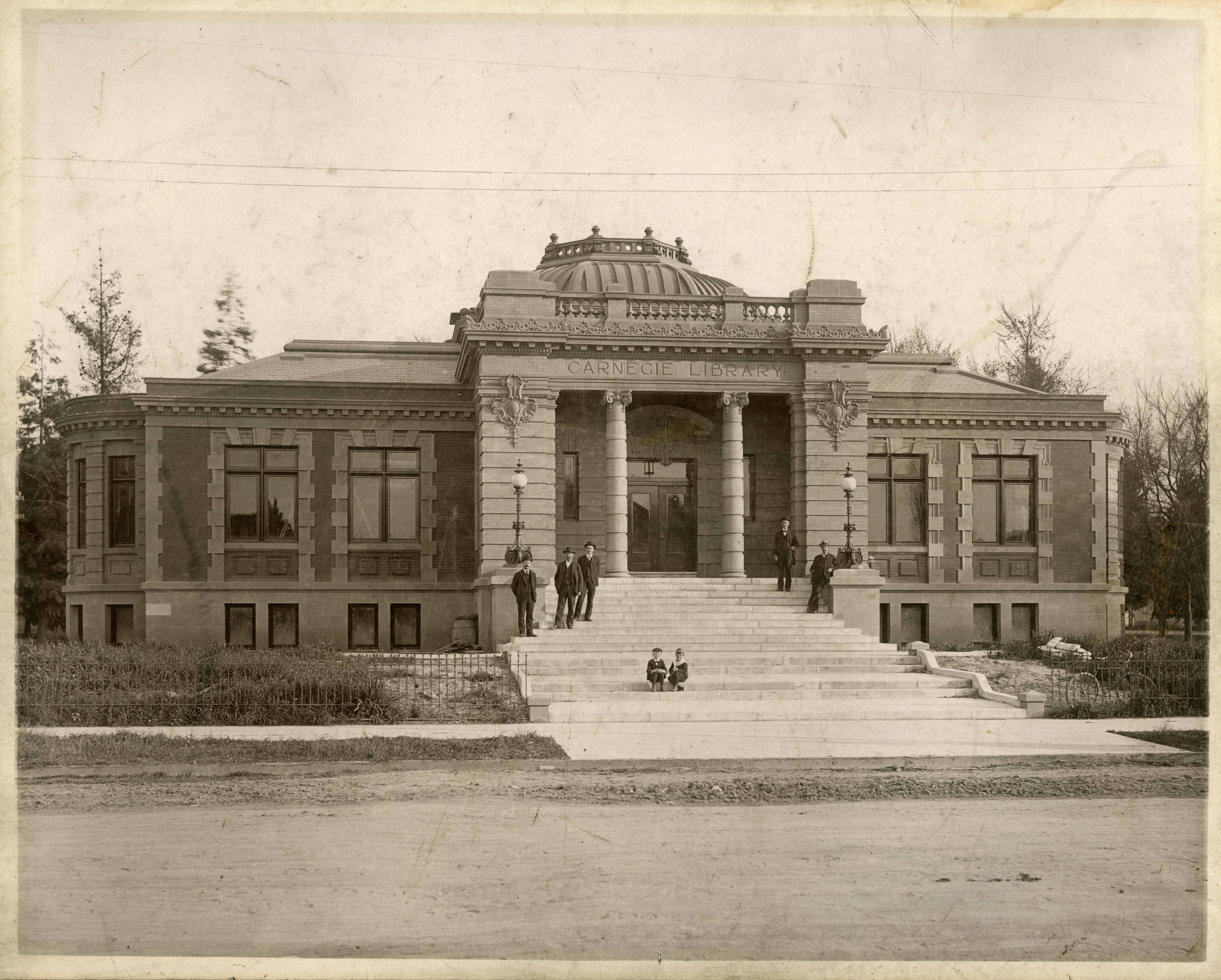

General information
- Status: Demolished
- Type: Carnegie Library (1903–1936); Student Center (1936–1960)
- Architectural style: Classical Revival
- Location: San Jose, California
- Coordinates: 37.33545°N 121.88496°W
- Year built: 1901–1903
- Demolished: 1960
- Cost: $50,000
- Owner: City of San Jose (1901–1936); San Jose State University (1936–1960)

Design and construction
- Architect: William Binder
- Engineer: F.A. Curtis

The Main San José Carnegie Library was a Carnegie library in San Jose, California. It opened in 1903 and operated as a part of the San José Public Library, until being transferred to San Jose State University in 1936 and demolished in 1960.

== History ==
In 1901, Andrew Carnegie awarded the City of San Jose $50,000 (equivalent to $2,000,000 in 2025) to build a public Carnegie Library, and on June 27, 1901, the California State Normal School (now San José State University) agreed to donate the northwest corner of its campus, on 4th and San Fernando Streets, for the new construction. Mayor Charles J. Martin and local merchant O. A. Hale helped in the creation of this library. Built in a Classical Revival style, it was completed in 1903 and served as the central library of the city until 1936, when the central library moved to the old Post Office building (now the San José Museum of Art) and the building was sold back to San José State University, who converted into its Student Union.

The building was demolished in 1960 to make way for an expansion of the university’s Wahlquist Library. That library was later demolished in 2000 and replaced by the current King Library in 2003, which once again became the city’s central library.

== See also ==
- East San José Carnegie Branch Library
- Dr. Martin Luther King Jr. Library
- Diaz Compean Student Union
