= Cynthia Teniente-Matson =

American university administrator

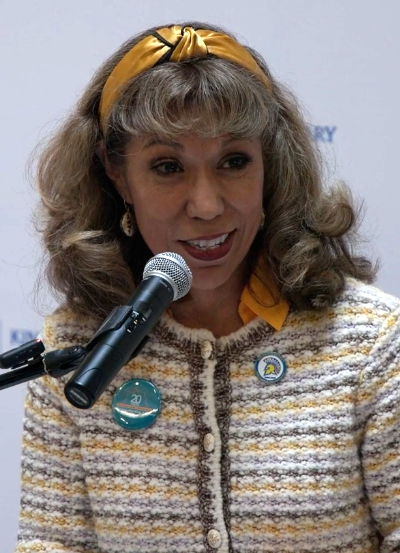
- Teniente-Matson at the King Library's 20th Anniversary in 2023

32nd President of San Jose State University
- Incumbent
- Assumed office January 16th, 2023
- Preceded by: Stephen Perez

2nd President of Texas A&M University–San Antonio
- In office 2014–2022
- Preceded by: Maria Hernandez Ferrier
- Succeeded by: Linda Schott

Personal details
- Born: 1965 (age 60–61) San Antonio, Texas, U.S.
- Spouse: Mike Matson
- Children: 2
- Education: University of Alaska Fairbanks (BA); University of Alaska Anchorage (MBA); California State University, Fresno (EdD)
- Profession: University Administrator
- Website: Office of the President

Academic background
- Thesis: A leadership competency study of higher education chief business officers (2013)
- Doctoral advisor: Sharon Brown Welty

Academic work
- Discipline: Education
- Institutions: University of Alaska Anchorage; California State University, Fresno; Texas A&M University–San Antonio; San Jose State University

Cynthia Teniente-Matson (born 1965) is the 32nd and current president of San Jose State University and the former president of Texas A&M University–San Antonio. Born in San Antonio, Teniente-Matson spent her adolescence in California, studied at the University of Alaska Fairbanks, and studied and worked at the University of Alaska Anchorage. She then returned to California to work at California State University, Fresno, where she later earned her doctorate before returning to San Antonio to accept a position as TAMU–San Antonio's president. There Teniente-Matson oversaw the university's growth into a four-year college with its first freshman class in 2016.

== Early life and career ==
Teniente was born in San Antonio, Texas, where she grew up on the city's South Side until moving to California at age eight. Teniente worked as a grocery store bagger for her first job.

For her secondary education, Teniente-Matson moved to Alaska, where she lived for 25 years. She first attended the University of Alaska Fairbanks, where she majored in petroleum engineering before changing programs, earning a Bachelor of Arts in management in 1989. In 1991, Teniente-Matson began working various administrative roles for the University of Alaska Anchorage, earning a master's degree in business administration in 1998 and holding a position as its vice chancellor of administrative services until returning to California in 2004. There, Teniente-Matson became vice president for administration and chief financial officer for California State University, Fresno (Fresno State), and chaired "the Fresno State Association, the President's Commission on Human Relations and Equity, and the CSU Risk Management Authority." In 2013, she received a Doctor of Education degree in Educational Leadership from Fresno State.

Teniente-Matson serves on the board of the American Association of State Colleges and Universities, the Higher Education Resource Services, and Campus Compact.

== TAMU San Antonio presidency ==
In 2014, the board of regents of the Texas A&M University System (TAMU) hired Teniente-Matson as the president of the San Antonio campus, which was the first college campus to open in the historically underserved area. She succeeded Maria Hernandez Ferrier, who oversaw the university's founding years, accreditation, and partnership with the local Toyota plant. Teniente-Matson's initial goals included similar campus research partnerships in locally-relevant areas, such as water conservation or cybersecurity. By 2016, Teniente-Matson had overseen the university's transformation from a satellite campus to a four-year college with its first entering freshman class, as well as the university's designation as a Hispanic-serving institution.

Teniente-Matson supported adding bike paths, trains, and entertainment facilities near the campus, on land owned by Verano Land Group with future development going through community meetings as of 2019. Additional goals included a student union with a student financial literacy center, as well as more dorms and intercollegiate athletics. On the subject of establishing a university under a tightening state budget, she stated, "what makes us unique is looking very closely at the students that we serve [...] what's unique about our own geography, and what's unique about our students, and then how we can build on that," as well as emphasizing the responsibility of university presidents to advocate for the university in the legislature and to keep the university's community informed.

In 2019, Teniente-Matson suggested to the superintendents of East Central, Edgewood, Harlandale, Somerset, South San Antonio, Southside, and Southwest Independent School Districts that they formally partner together to work towards common goals.

== San Jose State University presidency ==
Teniente-Matson departed TAMU-San Antonio to become the president of San Jose State University (SJSU), assuming the presidency on January 16, 2023. During her early tenure, she oversaw the finalization of the purchase of the south tower of the Fairmont Hotel, and its conversion into student housing.

In spring 2024, San Jose State became one of many universities where students established encampments to protest the Gaza War and Gaza Genocide. Teniente‑Matson placed two professors on leave after the protests: a justice studies professor who helped organize the encampments, and a history professor who was involved in a physical altercation with a protester. The history professor voluntarily retired, but the justice studies professor sought reinstatement. In November 2025, Teniente‑Matson upheld the professor's dismissal; however, the California State University system reinstated them on appeal. This led to an anti-retaliation lawsuit from the professor against the university.

In fall 2024 the San Jose State women's volleyball team became the subject of nation-wide attention after a longtime player was outed as a trans woman. The controversy subsequently became fuel for Donald Trump's 2024 presidential campaign and led to SJSU to become a target for funding cuts and lawsuits once Trump assumed his second term. Because of these attacks from the federal level, coupled with budget cuts from the state level, balancing SJSU's budget and diversifying its income streams became one of Teniente-Matson's priorities.
