= Maria Hernandez Ferrier =

1st President of Texas A&M University–San Antonio
- In office 2010–2014
- Succeeded by: Cynthia Teniente-Matson

Personal details
- Born: San Antonio, Texas, U.S.
- Education: Our Lady of the Lake University (B.A., M.Ed.); Texas A&M University (Ph.D.)
- Profession: University Administrator
- Website: Office of the President

Maria Hernandez Ferrier is a former government official and the first president of Texas A&M University–San Antonio from 2010-2014. After working as an unlicensed nurse's assistant for minimum wage, Ferrier attended her first community college class at age 30, and she has received a doctorate from Texas A&M University and other degrees from Our Lady of the Lake University. In 1992 and 2002, she was named as the director of the Office of English Language Acquisition, Language Enhancement and Academic Achievement for Limited English Proficient Students (OELA) separately under Presidents George H. W. Bush and George W. Bush; in this position, she served as the main advisor to the United States Secretary of Education for all matters related to students who speak limited-proficiency English.

== Early life and career ==
Ferrier grew up on the west side of San Antonio, Texas, on a dirt road that eventually became gravel, was paved with asphalt, and got a sidewalk. Her father taught her how to ride a bike and drive with vehicles purchased secondhand. As a child, she grew up within hearing distance of Our Lady of the Lake University but did not believe she was meant for higher education.

By age 30, Ferrier had had a divorce and two children, and she worked as a nurse's aide in the San Antonio State Hospital for minimum wage. Her mentor approached her about starting college, but Ferrier responded that she "wasn't college material." Her mentor then paid for Ferrier's first semester at San Antonio College, a local community college.

Next, Ferrier attended Our Lady of the Lake University in San Antonio, where she earned a bachelor's degree in speech and a master of education degree. She earned a Doctor of Education (Ed.D.) in education administration from Texas A&M University.

== Career in education and government ==
She worked for 17 years as an educator, focusing on creating programs for underserved children in San Antonio, such as the city's first in-school mentoring program and the creation of a partnership between the Southwest Independent School District and the Kelly Air Force Base. She was one of the founding members and creators of a program "designed to develop leaders for working in diverse communities" and worked as the director of English as a second or foreign language programs for the North East Independent School District. She next became the executive director of City Year, an AmeriCorps network member.

For the final month of the presidency of George H. W. Bush in December 1992, Ferrier became the director of the precursor to the Office of Bilingual Education and Minority Languages Affairs (OBEMLA), which would later be renamed as the Office of English Language Acquisition, Language Enhancement and Academic Achievement for Limited English Proficient Students (OELA). In 2002, under the Presidency of George W. Bush, Ferrier was appointed as the Director of OELA making her the main advisor to the United States Secretary of Education for all topics related to students with limited English proficiency.

== TAMU San Antonio presidency ==
In 2010, Senate Bill 629 passed under Texas Governor Rick Perry to designate Texas A&M University–San Antonio as an independent campus under the Texas A&M University System, and Ferrier became the institution's first president after serving as interim president. During her presidency, she oversaw the beginning of 22 undergraduate programs, 10 graduate programs, the creation of the main campus, and the institution's accreditation from the Southern Association of Colleges and Schools. She also focused on creating a partnership with the US military, founded the a center for education and cultural arts in downtown San Antonio, and decorated the campus with tiles from Mexico and sandstone from San Saba County, Texas.

== Awards and memberships ==
She has been recognized by United Way as the Volunteer of the Year, by the Mind Science Foundation via the Imagineer Award, by the National Hispanic Heritage Month via the Education Award, and she is a member of the San Antonio Women's Hall of Fame.

Ferrier's memberships on boards and commissions include "the San Antonio Literacy Commission, the San Antonio Rotary Board, the National Campfire USA Board, the City Year National Board, San Antonio Air Force Community Council, the Governors Restructuring Middle School Task Force and the Corporation of National Service Board."

In 1999, the Center for Leadership Studies of her alma mater, Our Lady of the Lake University, chose Ferrier as its first distinguished visiting professor.
