= Stephen Perez =

American university administrator (born 1967)

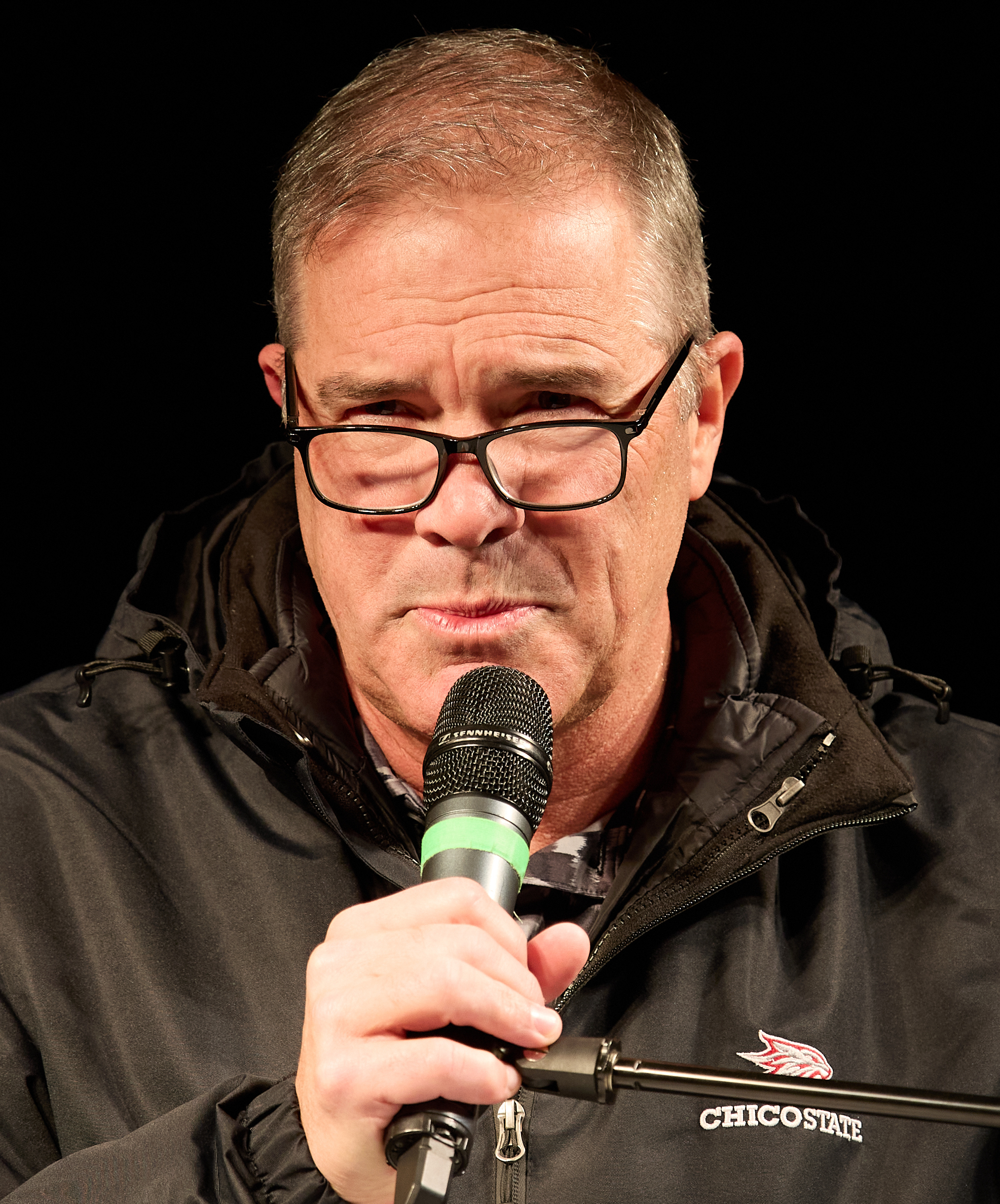
- Perez in 2024

13th President of California State University, Chico
- Incumbent
- Assumed office July 1, 2023
- Preceded by: Gayle E. Hutchinson

31st President of San José State University (Interim)
- In office January 3, 2022 – January 16, 2023
- Preceded by: Mary Papazian
- Succeeded by: Cynthia Teniente-Matson

Personal details
- Born: 1967 (age 58–59)
- Education: University of California, San Diego (BA); University of California, Davis (MA, PhD)
- Profession: University Administrator
- Website: Office of the President

Academic background
- Thesis: An investigation into the role of bank loans in the real economy (1994)

Academic work
- Discipline: Economics
- Institutions: Virginia Commonwealth University; Washington State University; California State University, Sacramento; San José State University; California State University, Chico

Stephen Perez (born 1967) is an American academic and university administrator. He is the 13th and current president of California State University, Chico, and was formerly an interim president of San José State University.

== Education and early career ==
Perez graduated with a BA in economics from the University of California, San Diego before earning his MA and PhD in economics from the University of California, Davis in 1994. Perez briefly taught economics at Virginia Commonwealth University and Washington State University before becoming a faculty member of California State University, Sacramento in 2001. At Sacramento State, he specialized in labor economics and sports economics and served as an assistant to the president for special projects, faculty athletics representative, and interim provost before being promoted to provost and vice president of academic affairs in the fall of 2019.

== Career ==
=== San Jose State University Presidency ===
On November 22, 2021, California State University Chancellor Joseph I. Castro appointed Perez to serve as the interim president of San José State University after Mary Papazian, the previous president, announced that she would be resigning on December 21, 2021, in the aftermath of a sex abuse scandal. Perez assumed the office on January 3, 2022. Throughout his term as interim president, Perez worked to increase university enrollment and diversity. His term ended on January 16, 2023, when Cynthia Teniente-Matson assumed the office.

=== California State University, Chico Presidency ===
Six days prior to the end of his term at San Jose State, it was announced that Perez would be joining California State University, Chico as an interim provost and vice president for academic affairs. Perez would serve in this role through the end of the 2022–23 school year when on May 24, 2023, Chico State announced that he would become the school's president for the following school year. Perez assumed the office on July 1, 2023.
