= East San José Carnegie Branch Library =

Carnegie library in California, US

- East San José Carnegie Library
- U.S. National Register of Historic Places
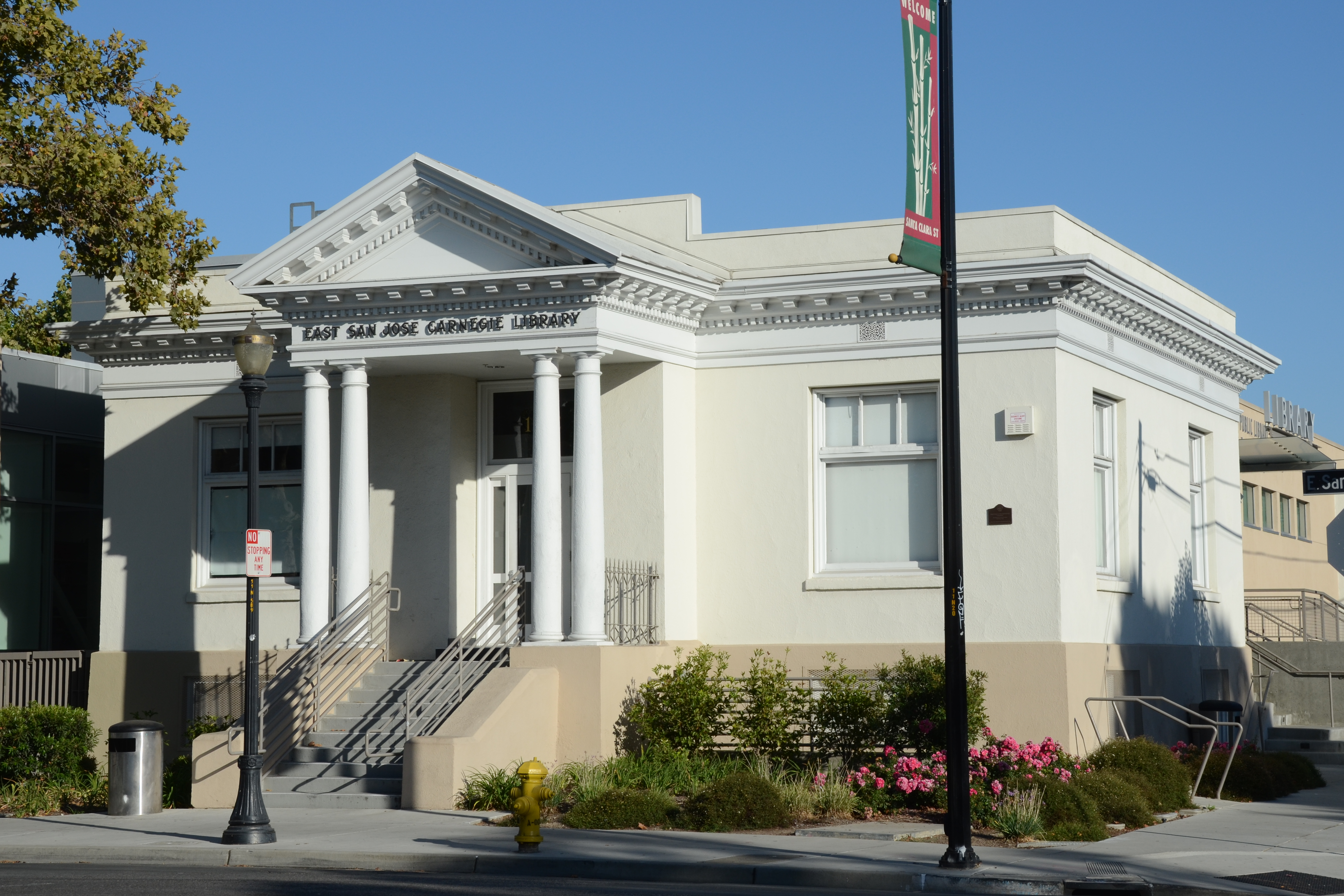
- Location: 1102 E. Santa Clara St., San Jose, California
- Coordinates: 37°20′49″N 121°52′3″W
- Area: less than 1-acre (4,000 m^{2})
- Built: 1907
- Architect: Lenzen, Jacob; Lenzen, Theodore
- Architectural style: Classical Revival
- MPS: California Carnegie Libraries MPS
- NRHP reference No.: 90001813
- Added to NRHP: December 10, 1990

The East San José Carnegie Branch Library is a Carnegie library in San Jose, California. It opened in 1908 and is the last Carnegie library in Santa Clara County still operating as a public library. It is a part of the San José Public Library.

== History ==
Originally the only library in East San Jose, built for $7,000 in 1907, the library joined the City of San Jose system when East San Jose was annexed by San Jose. The original building was renovated and added to in 1981. In 1990, it was listed on the National Register of Historic Places.

Another renovation of the branch, including a 10,000-square-foot (930 m^{2}) addition to the original historic structure, was begun on February 14, 2008. The ribbon-cutting ceremony for the newly reopened branch took place at 11:00am on August 29, 2009. The East San Jose Carnegie Library received LEED Silver certification and the 2010 Citation Award as a Distinguished Building in the adaptive re-use/renovation project category by the Santa Clara Valley Chapter of the American Institute of Architects.

== See also ==
- Main San José Carnegie Library
- List of Carnegie libraries in California
