= Texas A&M University–San Antonio =

Public university in San Antonio, Texas, U.S.

- Former names: Texas A&M University–Kingsville System Center (2000–2009)
- Type: Public university
- Established: 2009; 17 years ago
- President: Salvador Hector Ochoa
- Faculty: 223 full time and 149 part time (fall 2023)
- Students: 7,584
- Undergraduates: 6,706
- Postgraduates: 878
- Location: San Antonio, Texas, U.S. 29.3043°N 98.5247°W
- Campus: 580 acres (230 ha)
- Colors: Black, Silver & "Madla" Maroon
- Nickname: Jaguars
- Sporting affiliations: NAIA – RRAC
- Mascot: General the Jaguar
- Website: www.tamusa.edu

Texas A&M University–San Antonio is a public university in San Antonio, Texas, United States. It is part of the Texas A&M University System. The university was established on May 23, 2009, and held its first classes as a stand-alone university on August 20, 2009. It currently enrolls more than 7,300 students and offers undergraduate and graduate-level classes, as well as a graduate alternative teacher certification program. Texas A&M–San Antonio has 161 full and part-time faculty. Texas A&M–San Antonio is the first Texas A&M University System institution to be established in a major urban center.

== History ==
=== Kingsville System Center ===
Texas A&M University–San Antonio opened under the name Texas A&M University–Kingsville System Center after SB 629, authored by Senator Frank Madla, was passed in 2000. The Texas Legislature authorized $40 million in tuition revenue bonds for this new campus in 2006 under HB 153, contingent on full-time enrollment reaching 1,500 by January 1, 2010. The university temporarily held classes at Olivares Elementary School, a former school of the South San Antonio Independent School District. The temporary campus allowed the university to double its classroom capacity and meet the enrollment goal. Krista Torralva of the San Antonio Express-News described TAMU alumnus Greg Garcia, a friend of Madla, as the spiritus movens of the concept of TAMU San Antonio.

Texas A&M University–San Antonio was created to address an educational need in the South Side of San Antonio. The Texas Legislature asked the Texas A&M University System to establish a center that would offer junior- and senior-level courses in South San Antonio, an area that has been historically underserved in terms of higher education. Such a center was approved by the Texas Higher Education Coordinating Board in January 2000. Texas A&M University–Kingsville was named the lead institution to create and operate the System Center, which first operated on nearby Palo Alto College, a community college in the Alamo Colleges system. The Center used surveys and research to determine the types of programs most in demand in the area.

=== Texas A&M University–San Antonio ===
Construction on the university's permanent campus began after the Texas A&M University System Board of Regents approved final design plans in March 2010, and a groundbreaking ceremony was scheduled for May 7, 2010. The first building, Senator Frank L. Madla Building, finished construction in Summer 2011 and faculty and staff from the School of Arts and Sciences and the School of Education moved in time for the Fall 2011 enrollment. As of 2014, 74% of students were first-generation college students.

Now an independent institution, Texas A&M–San Antonio offers 30 undergraduate degrees and 13 graduate degrees.

As the Texas A&M University System's second newest institution (after Texas A&M University–Central Texas) and San Antonio's second public university, Texas A&M University–San Antonio complements the crosstown University of Texas at San Antonio (UTSA) in bringing public education to the San Antonio metropolitan area.

Texas A&M University–San Antonio as of 2016 is a 4-year institution, with freshmen being admitted for the Fall semester. The campus is being built in part due to a plan by the Texas Higher Education Coordinating Board to enroll 630,000 students in college by 2015. Texas A&M San Antonio opened their doors to college freshmen in 2016 with 557 freshmen that fall semester.

In Fall 2022, Texas A&M University-San Antonio had 9th and 10th graders from Shirleen Zacharias Early College Leadership Academy, a high school in Somerset, Texas, go to their campus and they will study alongside the other college students for free.

=== Presidents ===
- Maria Hernandez Ferrier (2010–2014)
- Cynthia Teniente-Matson (2014–2022)
- Linda Schott [Interim] (2023–2023)
- Salvador Hector Ochoa (2023–present)

== Campus ==
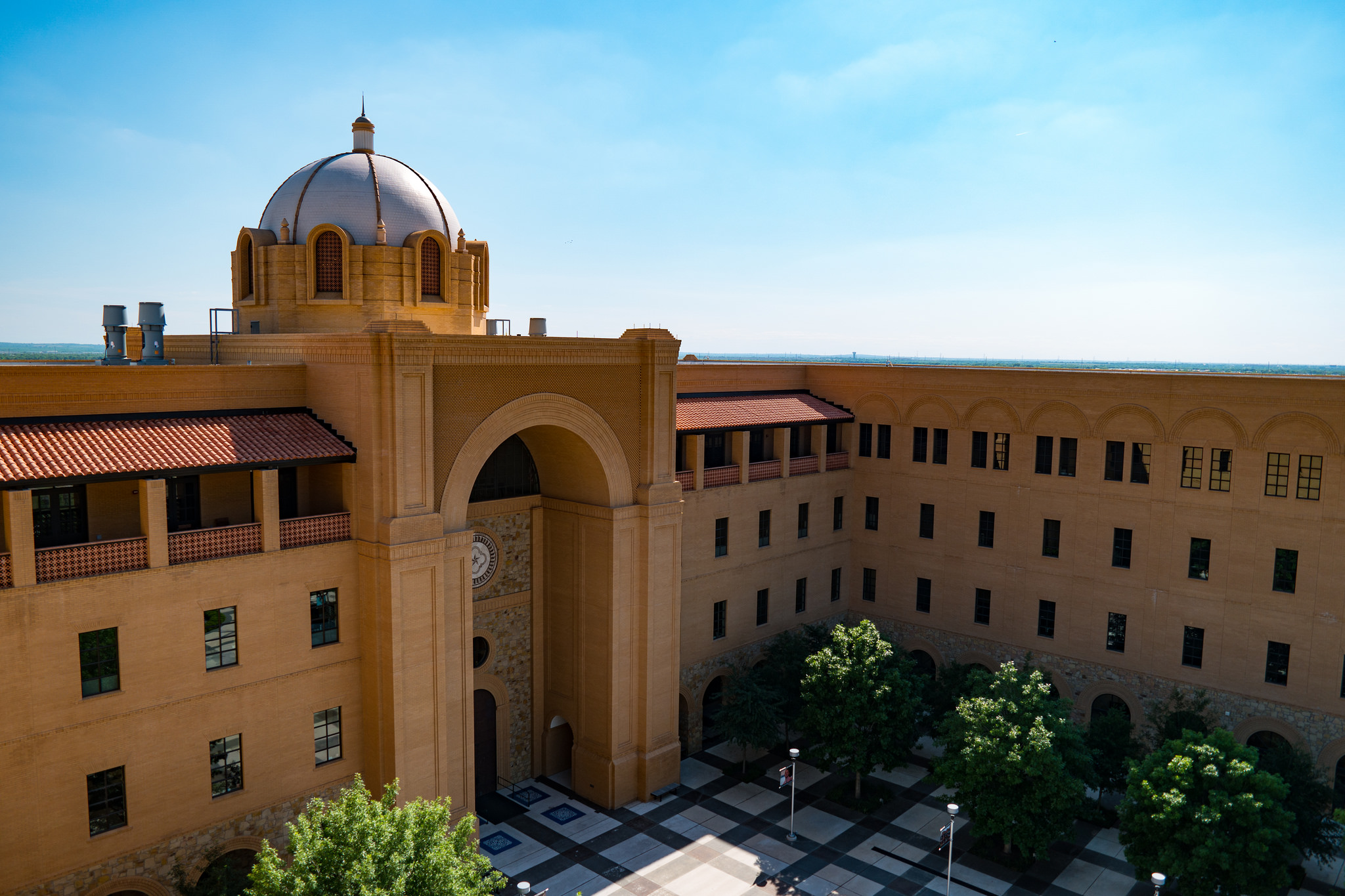
Central Academic Building

The campus is off of Interstate 410 ("Loop 410"), 12 miles (19 km) from Downtown San Antonio. The university's main campus was constructed on a 580 acres (2 km^{2}) site on the south side of San Antonio, near Loop 410 and Zarzamora. The developer of the land is Verano Land Group LP, who donated the 694-acre (2.81 km^{2}) lot and one million dollars for scholarships. Initially surrounded by rural land, plans for the main campus included it to be constructed alongside a 2,500-acre (1,011.7 ha) planned community with mixed-use commercial and residential development by Verano to create a vibrant living-and-learning, modern college town community. Despite continued development on the university property, work on the surrounding areas owned by Verano Land Group stalled when the company got entangled in a litigation matter over land developer rights with a group of former company partners. Following the settlement, Verano left the project and sold land surrounding the campus property to other developers with similar plans for the land to the original Verano project. In November 2019, SouthStar Communities announced the acquisition of 600 acres of the original 1,800 owned by Verano Land Group along with plans for a planned community on property adjacent to University Way, the long entry boulevard to the campus from Loop 410. The development will include 2,500 multi-family units, 2,400 single-family homes, and 750 condos, office space, retail space, industrial space, and recreational sport facilities, trails, and parks. Like the initial plans, the VIDA planned community is intended to complement the growing Texas A&M University–San Antonio campus.

The architectural firm responsible for the campus plans are Kell Munoz and the Construction Manager at Risk is Bartlett Cocke. The campus buildings are designed with buff-colored sand-faced brick and San Saba, TX-sourced sandstone, articulated arches and accents that reflect the Architecture of San Antonio and South Texas. Elements of Old World and New World Spanish styles are also incorporated along with elements of Modern architecture such as glass, steel and reinforced concrete. The campus facilities are designed to LEED Silver standards and Energy Star rated roof materials.

=== Academic facilities ===
Construction of the permanent main campus began in early 2012 after formal approval of a $75 million university development fund from the Texas A&M System Board of Regents. The development outlined six phases from 2012 to 2025. In the first phases of development, the university constructed a large plaza, known as Main Quad, bracketed by the Central Academic Building (CAB), Patriots' Casa, Auditorium, and the Senator Frank L. Madla Building. Following completion of the initial phase, the university consolidated operations to the newly opened main campus. The Brooks City-Base campus was consolidated into Main Campus and held the final classes in December 2016. Texas A&M-San Antonio classes at The Alamo Colleges' Alamo University Center were consolidated into Main Campus and held the final classes in May 2017.

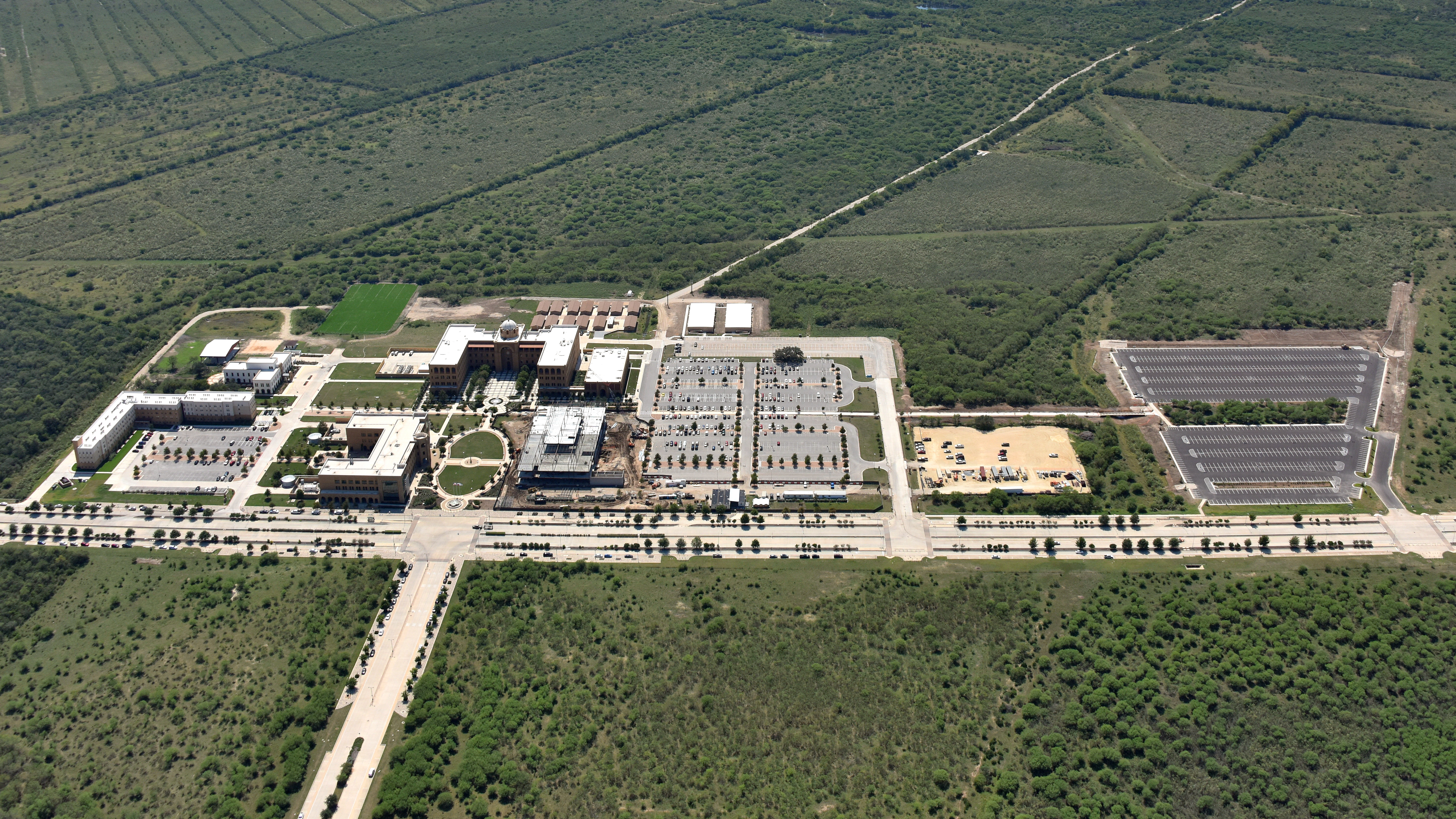
A&M–San Antonio Aerial Photo - Fall 2017

Positioned central in the development, the Central Academic Building is the landmark building of the campus. The four-story, 207,347-square-foot (19,263.2 m^{2}) building opened in 2014 and was designed with elements inspired by a cathedral in Granada, Spain. The structure features a four-story arch, embossed copper-clad main entry doors, decorative tile mosaic accents, and covered terraces. The building houses multiple student service offices, classroom and lecture hall space, library and quiet study areas, food court/cafe and campus book store. Attached to the CAB, the 420-seat Auditorium features space for performances, concerts, presentations and events.

Announced in 2012, the 23,000-square-foot (2,100 m^{2}) Patriots' Casa became the second building constructed on the campus. Designed in Mission Style and heavily inspired by Mission San Juan and Mission Espada, the facility features veteran support service offices and behavioral health services, as well as lab space, ceremony space, and ROTC office.

The 90,347-square-foot (8,393.5 m^{2}) Senator Frank L. Madla Building, originally constructed as the Multi-purpose Building, includes classroom and lab space, dining hall, permanent location of the university bookstore faculty offices, and the university police center. The building is named in honor of Senator Frank L. Madla for his legislative and public push efforts in the 1990s and early 2000s to establish a general academic teaching institution on the South Side of San Antonio.

A&M-SA opened the Science & Technology Building with the Grand Opening held on September 25, 2018. The state-of-the-art STEM focused 140,000-square-foot (13,000 m^{2}) facility houses two dozen classrooms and a dozen laboratories. It also houses the Mays Center for Experiential Learning and Community Engagement, supported by a $5 million gift from the Mays Family Foundation.

=== Residence Life ===
The university established its first residence hall, Esperanza Hall, with a capacity of 382, in fall 2017. At that point, students with credit hours below 30 and those in their first year must live in the building. After reaching 50% capacity in the first year of operation, the hall reached max capacity by Fall 2018. Some residential students criticized the university for the lack of after-hours dining options. As of 2019 all three university dining halls closed after 8:00 pm, combined with the estimated thirty minutes round-trip to fast food restaurants. According to President Teniente-Matson, "Nearly all students at Texas A&M University-San Antonio are working full-time while pursuing their educations."

Because of a large overflow in housing applicants for the 2021–2022 school year, A&M–San Antonio offered students rooms in three Southside hotels for the fall semester.

In 2024 Texas A&M University-San Antonio announced the upcoming opening of Estrella Hall, its second on-campus residence hall, slated for fall 2024. Spanish for the word "star," Estrella Hall joins Esperanza Hall (Spanish for "hope") to offer a combined 744 beds for A&M-San Antonio students.

== Academics ==
=== Enrollment ===
Texas A&M University–San Antonio experienced steady growth since its founding, as the fastest-growing university in Texas at a growth rate over 200% in the period from 2008 to 2013. After starting upper division and graduate exclusive curriculum, the university welcomed its first freshmen class for the 2016–2017. As of 2019 it had 6,671 students. In 2018, A&M University–San Antonio enrolled 6,557 students, of which 854 were graduate level. The majority of the students are first-generation from within Bexar County. As of Fall 2018, Texas residents account for 98.00% of the student population. Members of ethnic minority groups make up 84.00% of the student population. The student body consists of 61.00% women and 39.00% men.

=== Colleges and schools ===
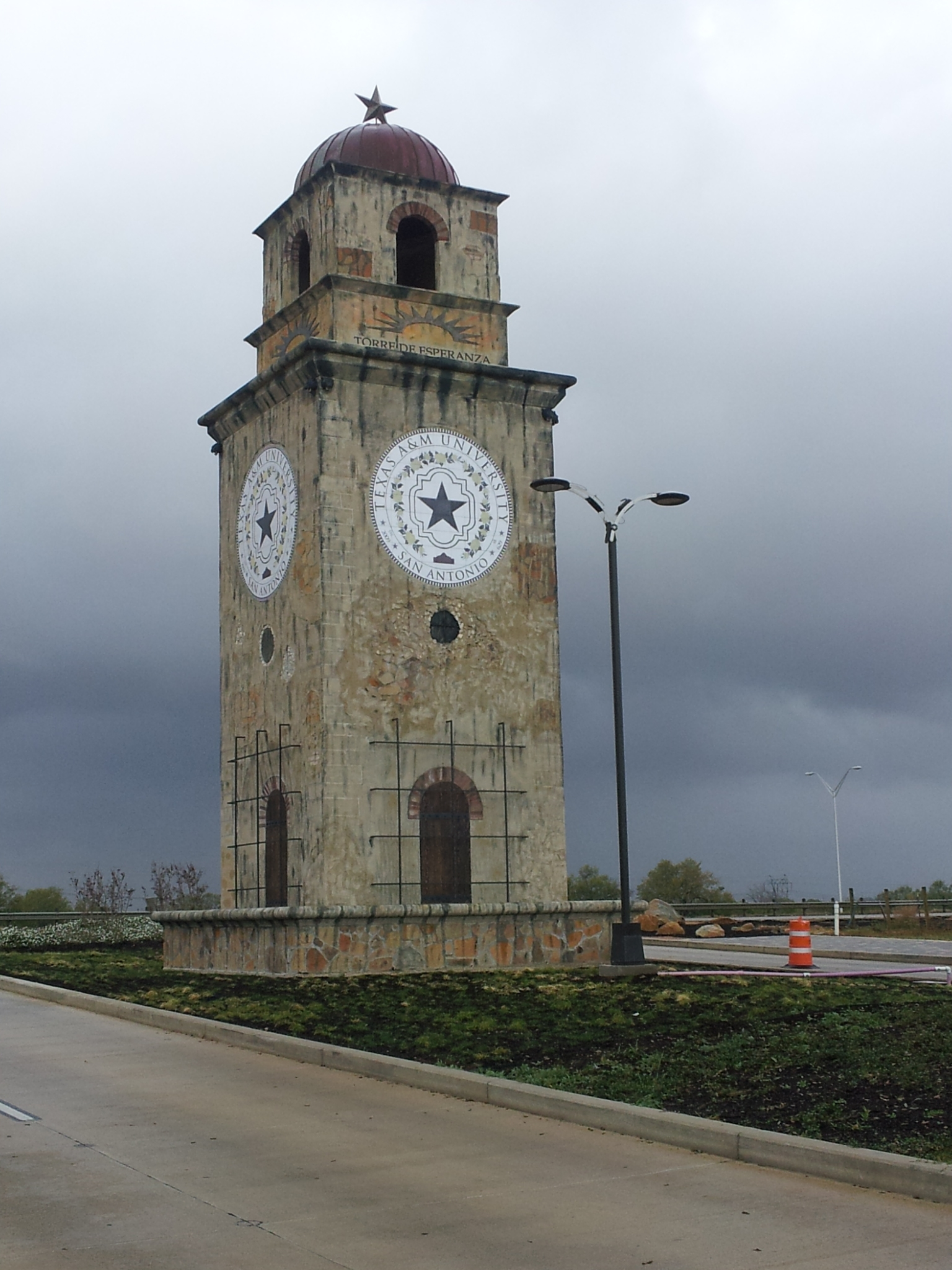
The Torre de Esperanza at University Way

Texas A&M University–San Antonio offers 30 majors in diverse areas of study and confers degrees from four colleges and schools. The university is classified as a Master's college and university by the Carnegie Classification of Institutions of Higher Education. The university has full accreditation to award baccalaureate and master's degrees from the Southern Association of Colleges and Schools (SACS) and received its ten-year renewal in 2019–2020 academic year.

The university has an 18-to-1 student-faculty ratio and offers bachelor's degrees and master's degrees through its four colleges and schools:

- College of Arts and Sciences
- College of Business
- College of Education and Human Development
- College of Graduate Studies

=== Center for Information Technology and Cyber Security ===
Texas A&M University–San Antonio's Center for Information Technology and Cyber Security offers students educational programs that will prepare them for careers in information technology and cyber security. Their educational programs consist of Computer Science and Computer Information Systems with available concentrations in Information Assurance, Enterprise Resource Planning Systems, and Project Management. A Cyber Defense Program Certificate is available as long as students complete the required coursework. A Bachelor of Applied Arts and Sciences degree is offered to students that have completed technical or vocational credits outside of the university and wish to transfer them towards obtaining this degree with concentrations in Business Information Technology, Information Assurance and Security, Project Management, and Enterprise Resource Planning.

Texas A&M University is designated as a National Center of Academic Excellence in Cyber Defense by the National Security Agency (NSA) and Department of Homeland Security (DHS). Texas A&M University is the only university in Texas to partner with Facebook in instituting a cyber security program for addressing shortages in the career field.

== Athletics ==
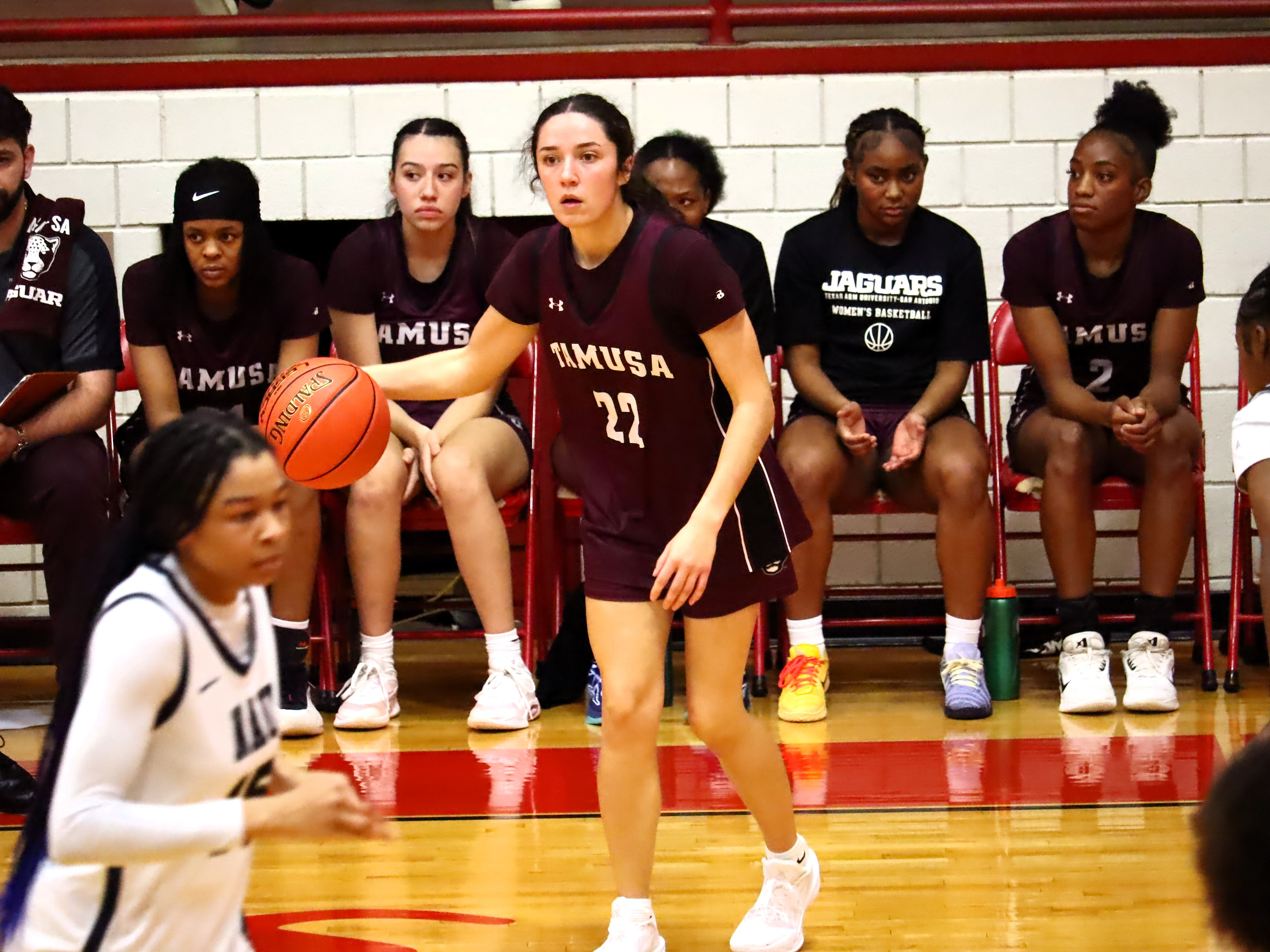
A 2025 TAMU–SA women's basketball game

The Texas A&M–San Antonio (TAMUSA) athletic teams are called the Jaguars. The university is a member of the National Association of Intercollegiate Athletics (NAIA), primarily competing in the Red River Athletic Conference (RRAC) since the 2020–21 academic year (the same season when it began its intercollegiate athletics program and joined the NAIA).

TAMUSA competes in six intercollegiate varsity sports: Men's sports include golf and soccer; while women's sports include soccer and softball.

=== History ===
In August 2019, the university announced plans to add intercollegiate athletics programs for the following academic year. The decision was announced after the Texas A&M System board of regents approved TAMUSA adding a student fee to support athletics. The measure was first passed by an overwhelming student body vote to add a $10 per credit hour fee, up to a maximum of $120 per semester, to create and fund the department. Simultaneously to working with the student government, Texas A&M–San Antonio conducted a feasibility of adding athletics that recommended the university join the RRAC at the NAIA level.

The university began its athletics program with men's & women's soccer, men's golf and softball. Men's & women's basketball were added in the 2024-25 academic year.

== Nickname/Mascot ==
The A&M-SA team nickname is the Jaguars. Their mascot is "General the Jaguar," a black-and-gray jaguar. He was redesigned in 2024 as the athletics program developed. The logo was designed by Torch Creative, a Dallas-based studio with clients such as the National Hockey League, the National Basketball Association, and Disney.

== Student Life ==
Undergraduate demographics as of Fall 2023
Race and ethnicity	Total
Hispanic	70%
White	18%
Black	6%
Two or more races	2%
Asian	1%
International student	1%
Unknown	1%
Economic diversity
Low-income (Note: The percentage of students who received an income-based federal Pell grant intended for low-income students.)	51%
Affluent (Note: The percentage of students who are a part of the American middle class at the bare minimum.)	49%

Texas A&M–San Antonio offers many opportunities for students to join a student organization or create their own organization that fits their needs. Campus Activities Board (CAB), Student Government Association (SGA), the Mesquite, the National Society of Leadership and Success (NSLS) are University sponsored organizations, meaning they receive funds originating from student fees. All other student clubs and organizations must meet set minimum requirements for recognition. Greek life at Texas A&M-San Antonio is present and steadily growing. There are two fraternities (Delta Chi ΔΧ & Omega Delta Phi ΩΔΦ) and two sororities (Sigma Delta Lambda ΣΔΛ & Zeta Phi Beta ΖΦΒ) that maintain active status within the university. The campus also has various honor societies on campus that are specific to a major of study. Texas A&M San Antonio also has intramural sports such as, basketball, flag football, sand volleyball, 8 ball pool, and many others.
