= San Jose Public Library =

Public library system in California, USA

San José Public Library
- Location: San Jose, California, United States
- Type: Public
- Established: 1872
- Branches: 25

Collection
- Size: 1,956,097

Access and use
- Circulation: 7.718 million items
- Population served: 975,415

Other information
- Budget: $68.4 million
- Director: Jill Bourne, City Librarian
- Website: www.sjpl.org

The San José Public Library (Spanish: Biblioteca Pública de San José) is the public library system of San Jose, California, made up of 25 branch libraries spread across the city.

== Organization ==
Its central library, Dr. Martin Luther King Jr. Library, is also the main library of San Jose State University. Built in 2003, King Library is the first joint use library in the United States shared by a major university as its only library and a large city as its main library. It has more than 1.6 million items. The building has nine floors that result in more than 475,000 square feet (44,100 m^{2}) of space with a capacity for 2 million volumes.

The city has 23 neighborhood branches including the Biblioteca Latinoamericana which specializes in Spanish language materials. The East San Jose Carnegie Branch Library, a Carnegie library opened in 1908, is the last Carnegie library in Santa Clara County still operating as a public library and is listed in the National Register of Historic Places. As the result of a bond measure passed in November 2000, a number of brand new or completely reconstructed branches have been completed and opened.

The San Jose system (along with the university system) was jointly named as "Library of the Year" by Library Journal in 2004.

== Branches ==
- Dr. Martin Luther King, Jr. Library
- Almaden
- Alviso
- Bascom
- Berryessa
- Biblioteca Latinoamericana
- Calabazas
- Cambrian
- Dr. Roberto Cruz – Alum Rock
- East S.J. Carnegie
- Edenvale
- Educational Park
- Evergreen
- Hillview
- Joyce Ellington
- Mt. Pleasant
- Pearl Avenue
- Rose Garden
- Santa Teresa
- Seven Trees
- Tully Community
- Village Square
- Vineland
- Willow Glen
- West Valley
Gallery of San José Public Library Branches

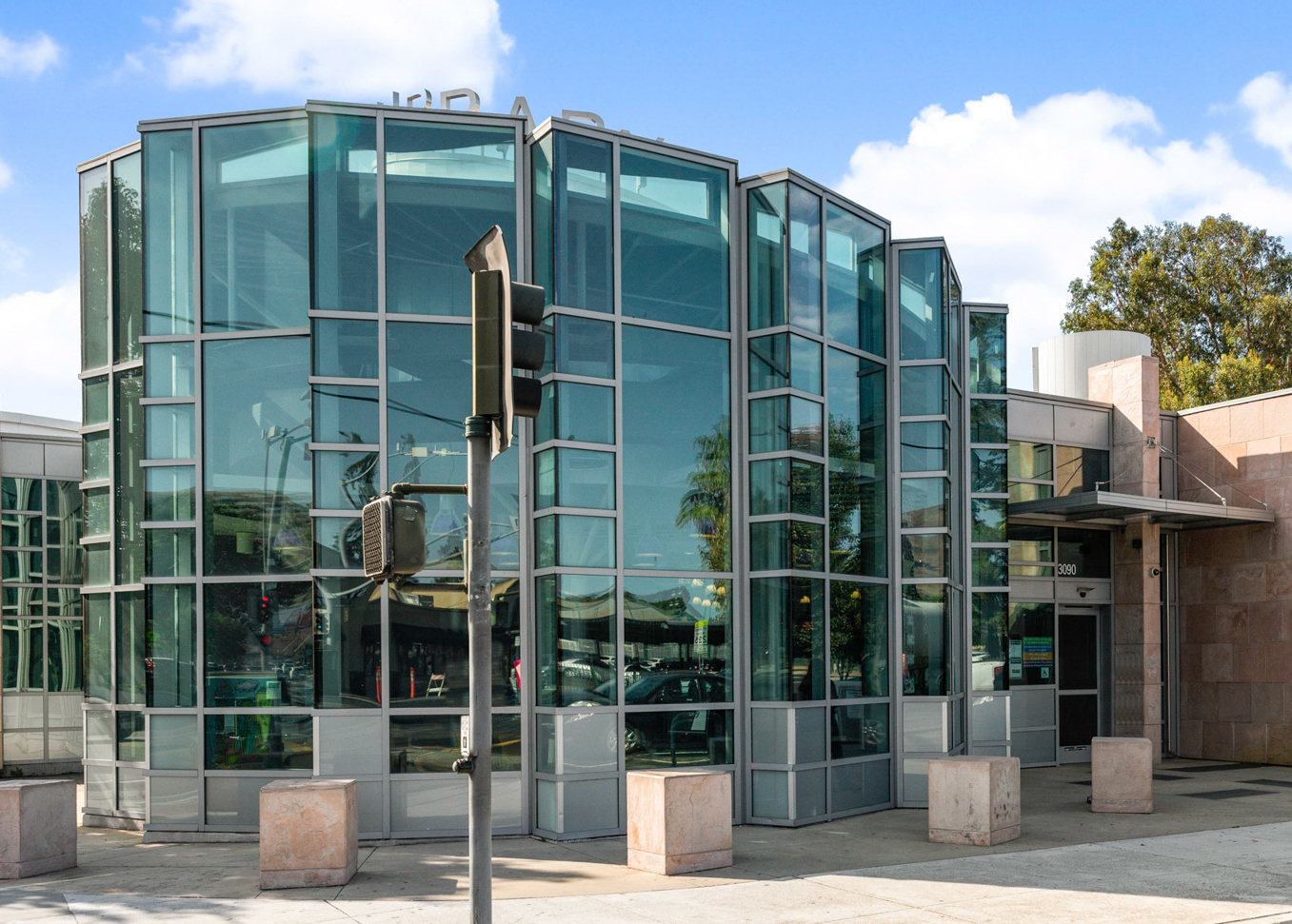
Alum Rock Branch

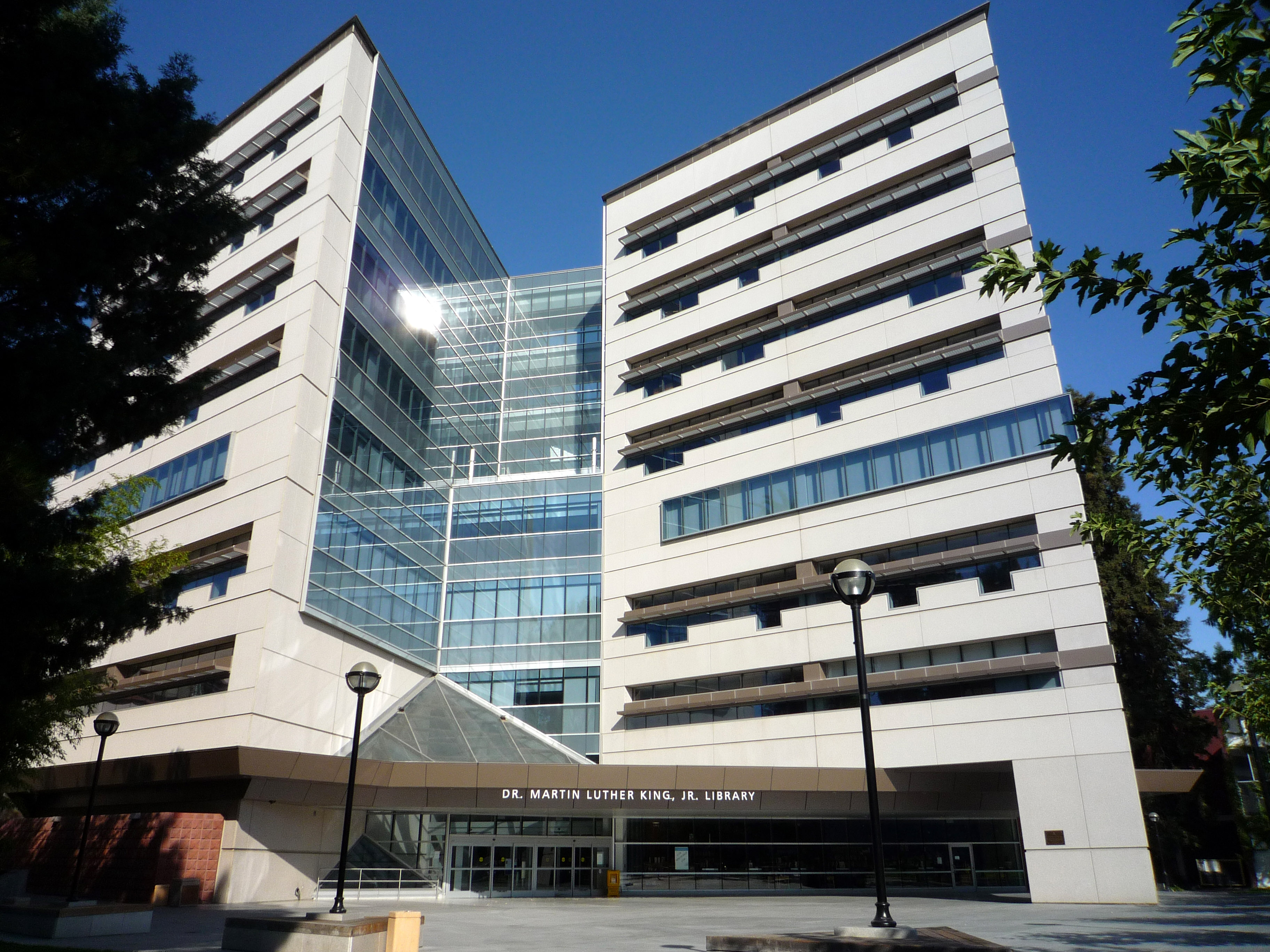
Dr. Martin Luther King, Jr. Library

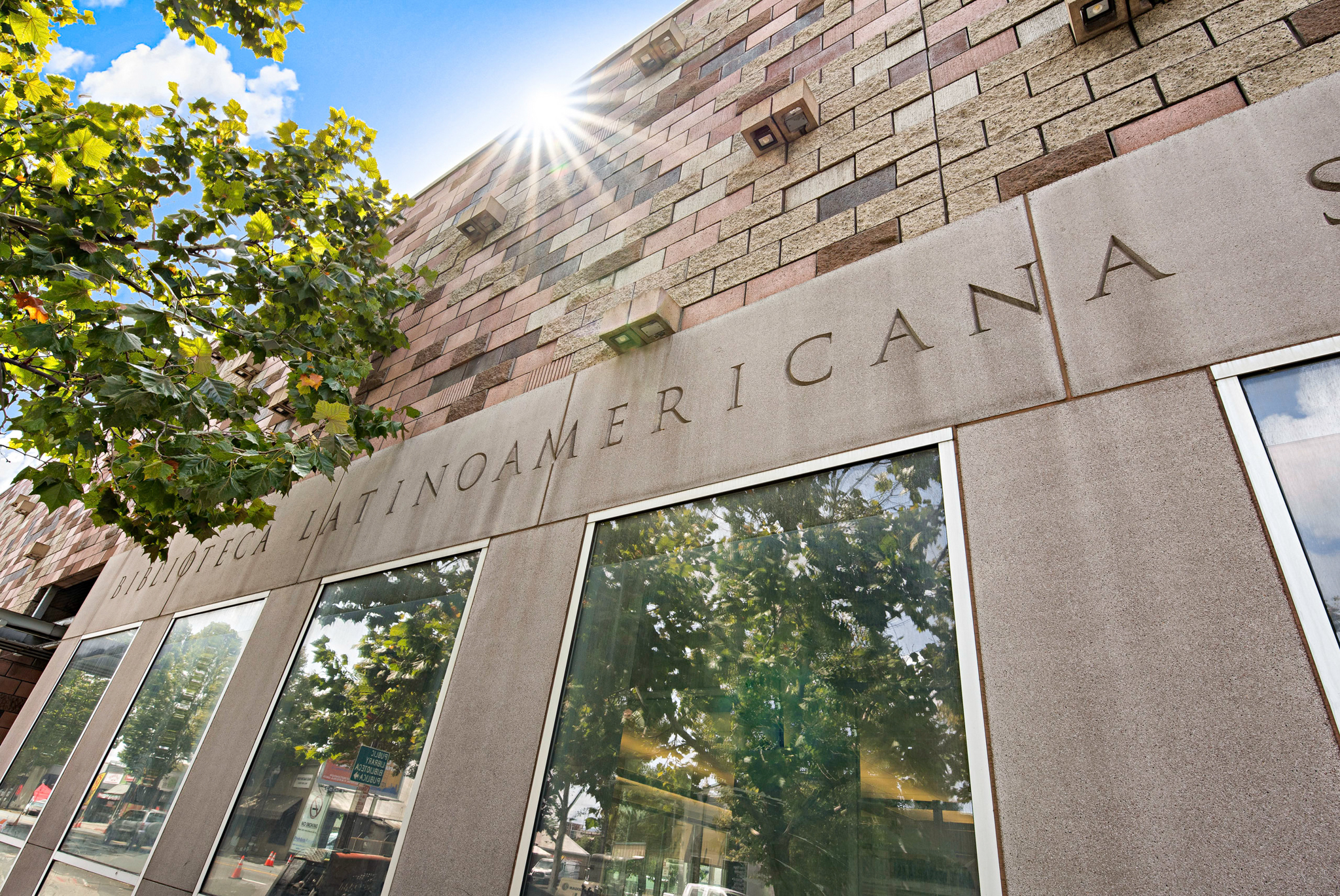
Biblioteca Latinoamericana

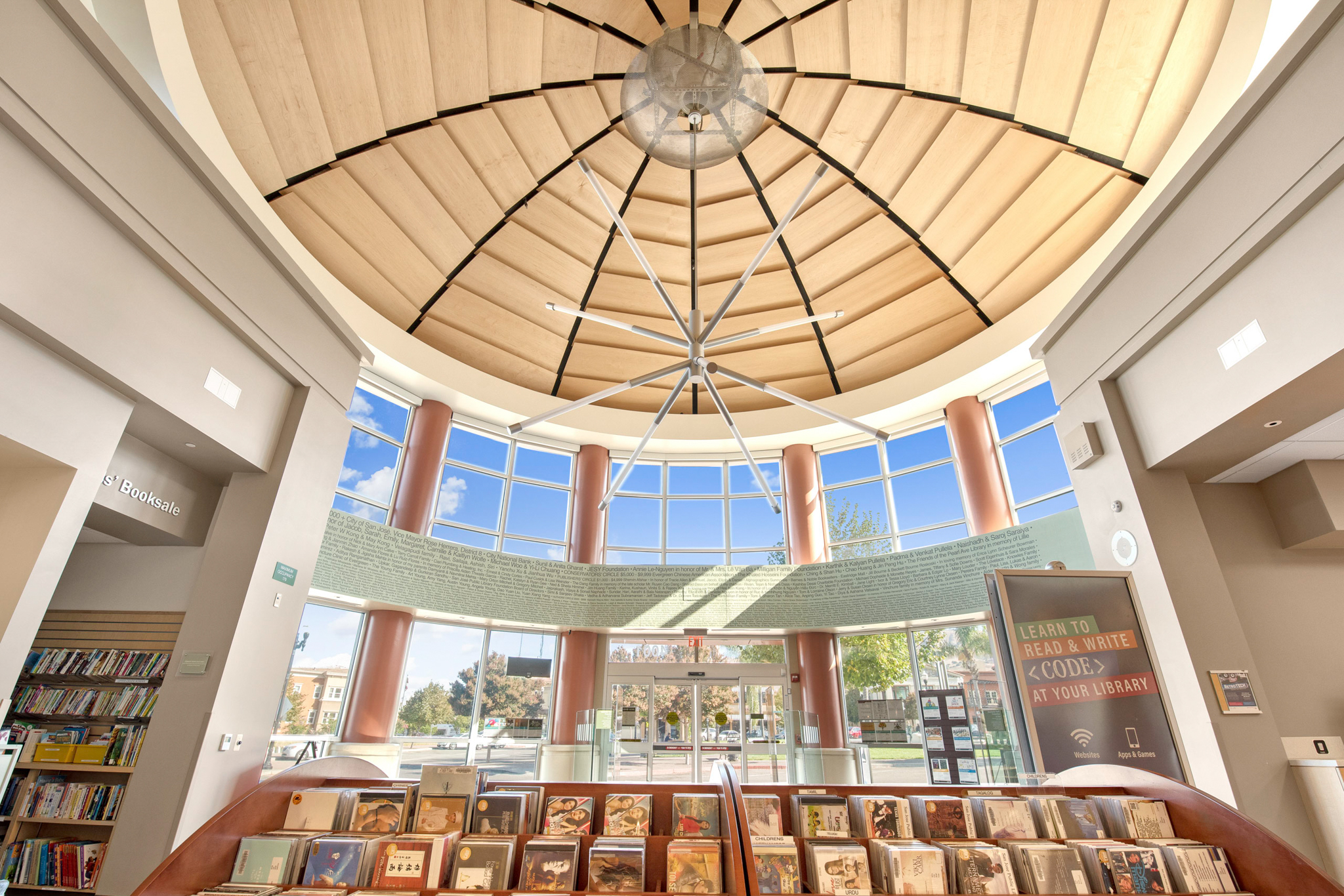
Evergreen Village Square Branch

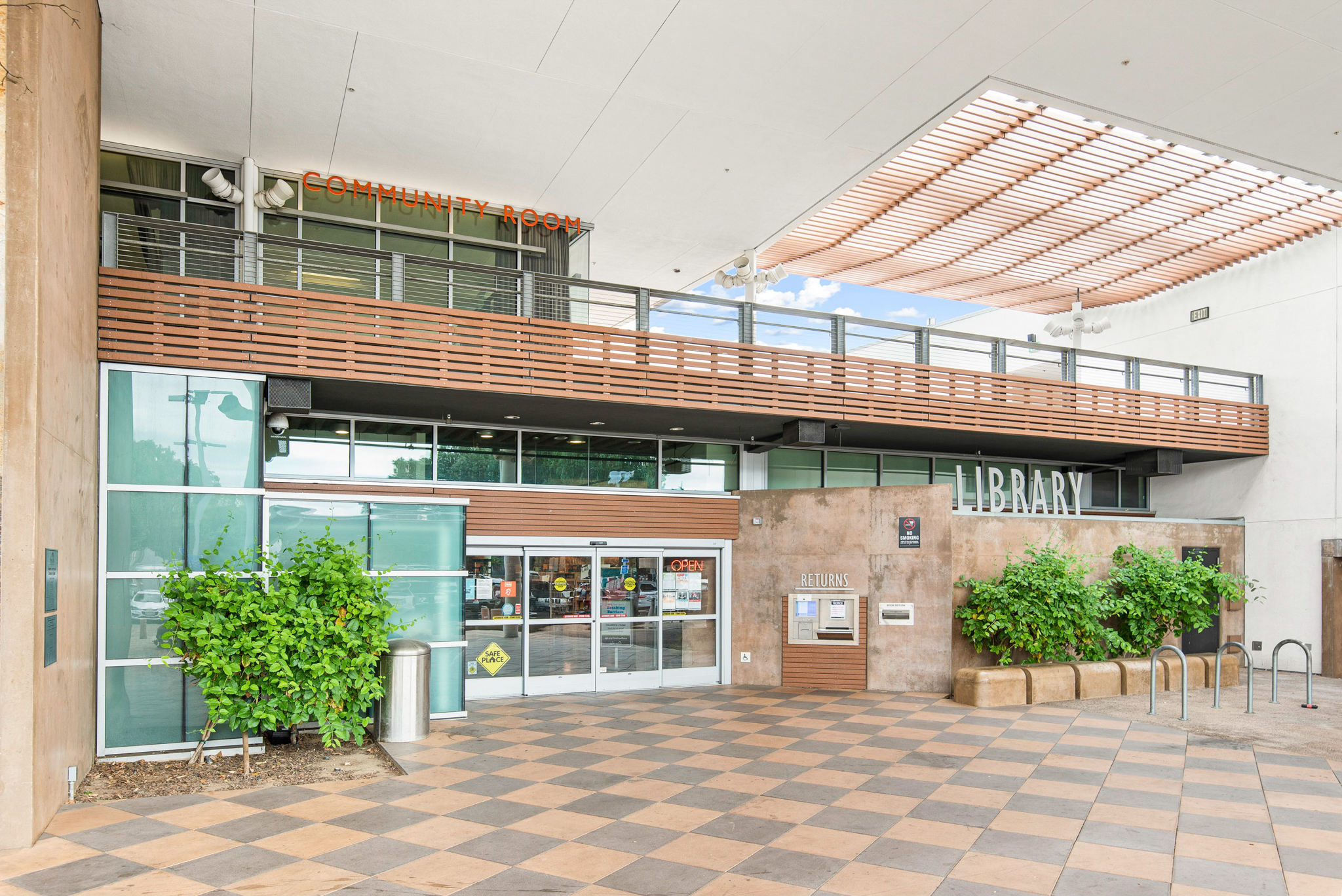
Bascom Branch

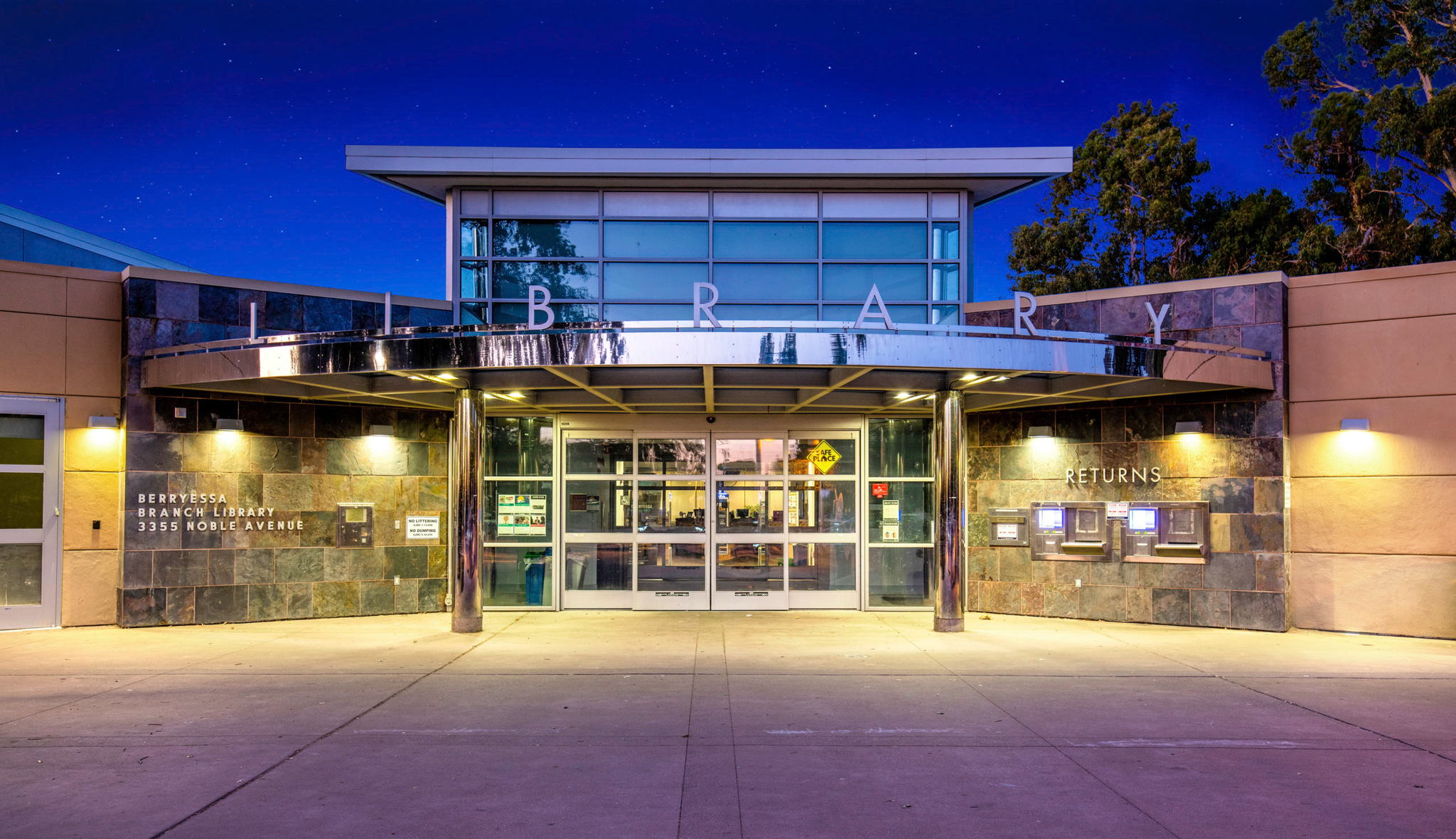
Berryessa Branch

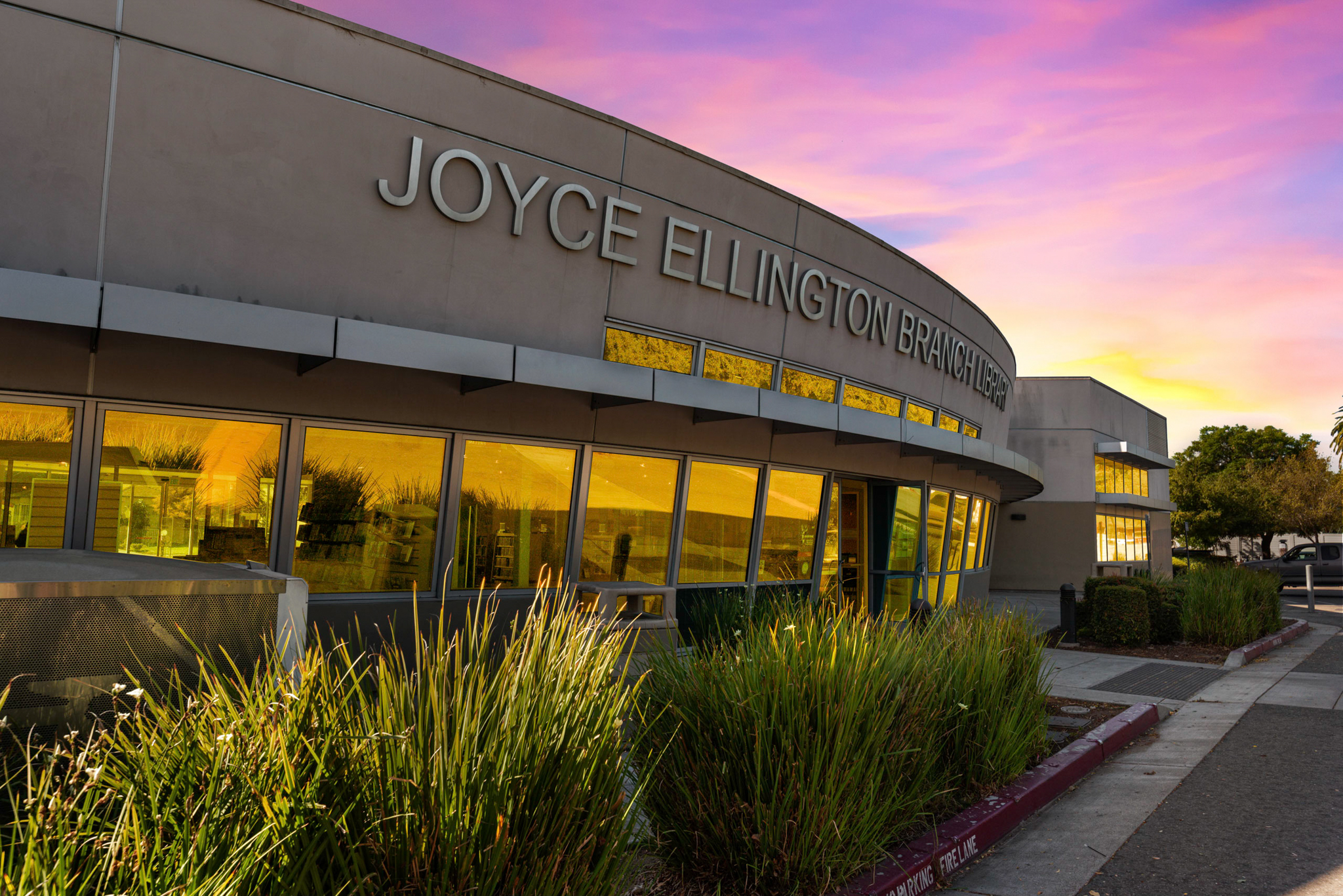
Joyce Ellington Branch

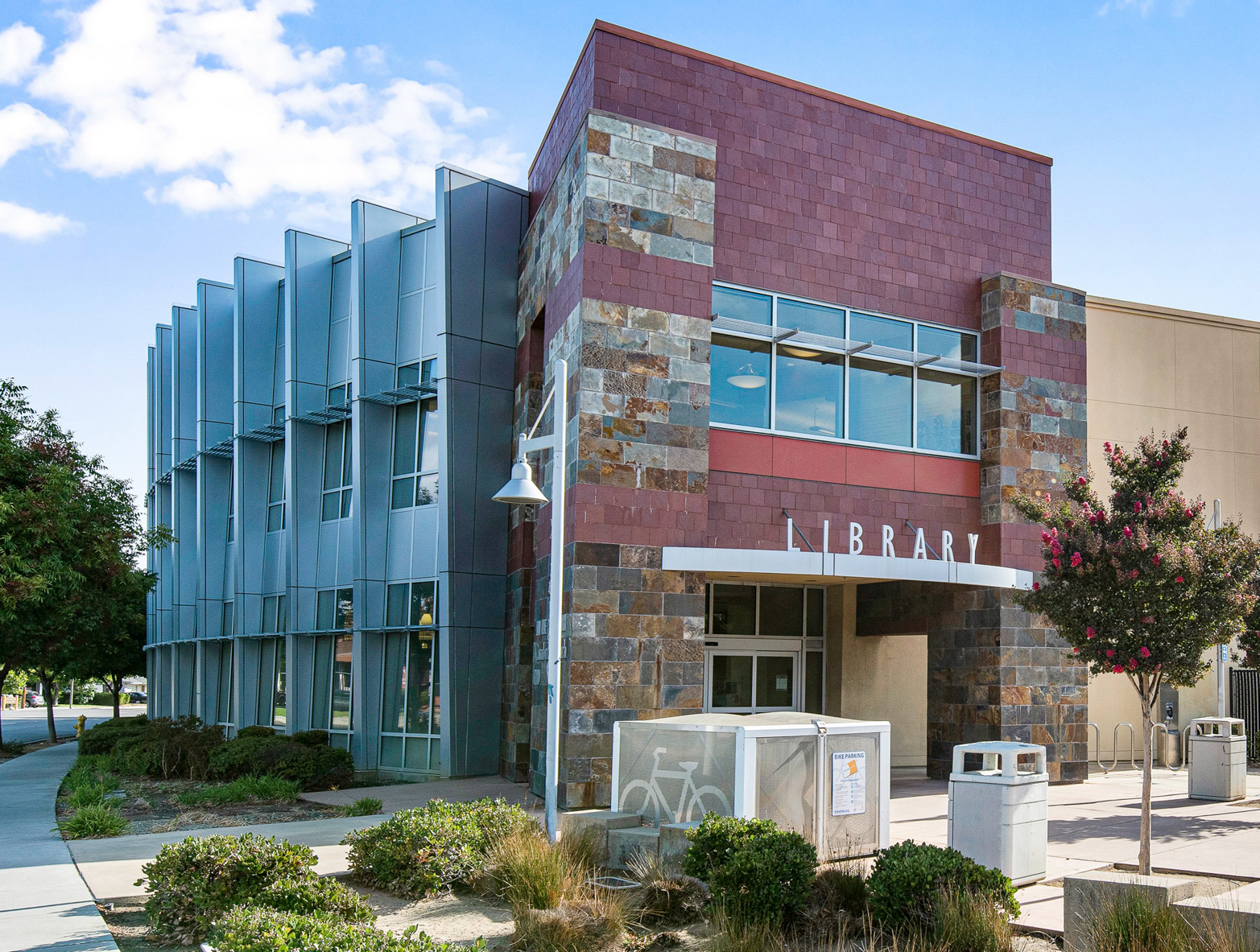
Cambrian Branch

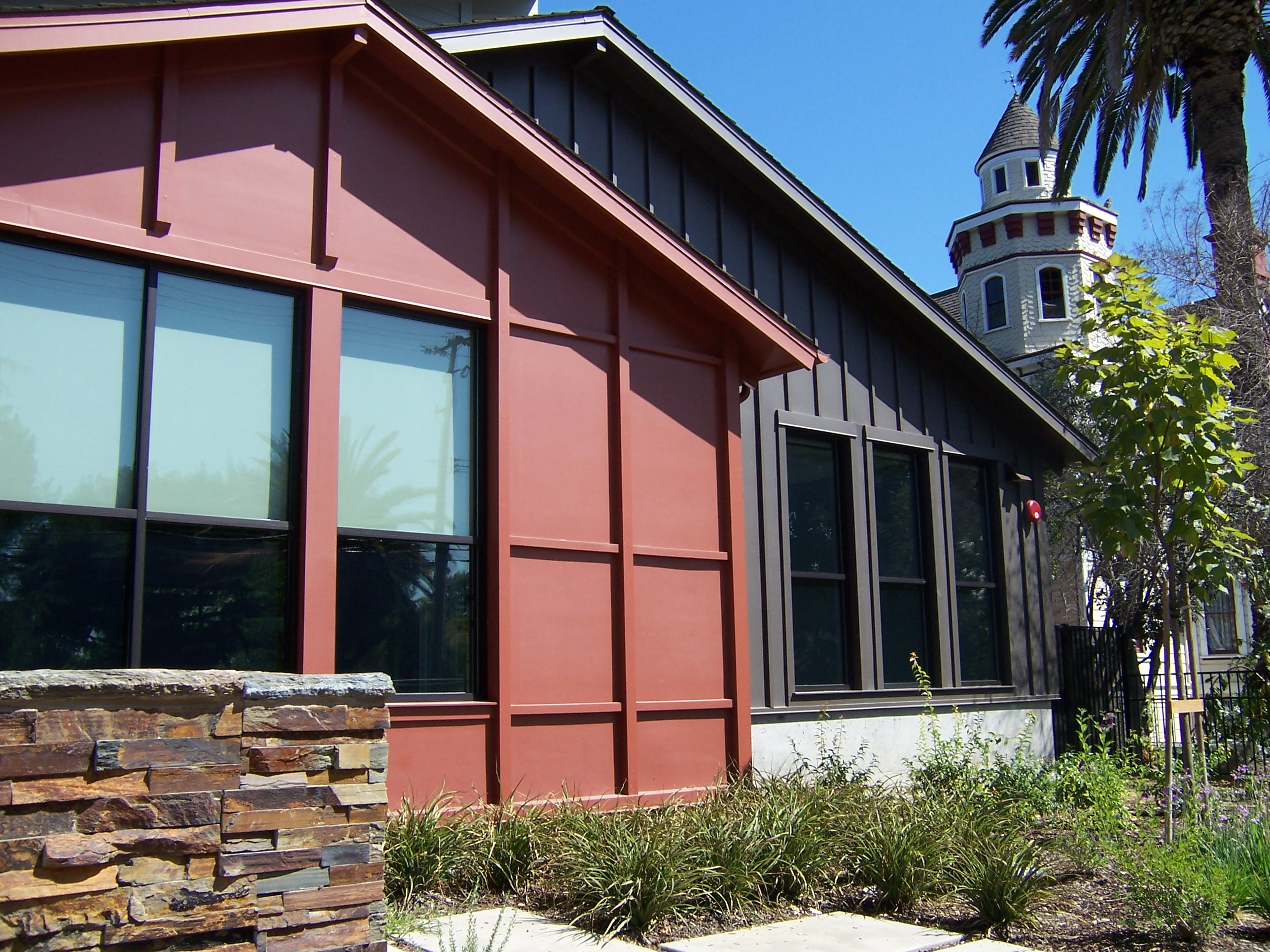
Willow Glen Branch

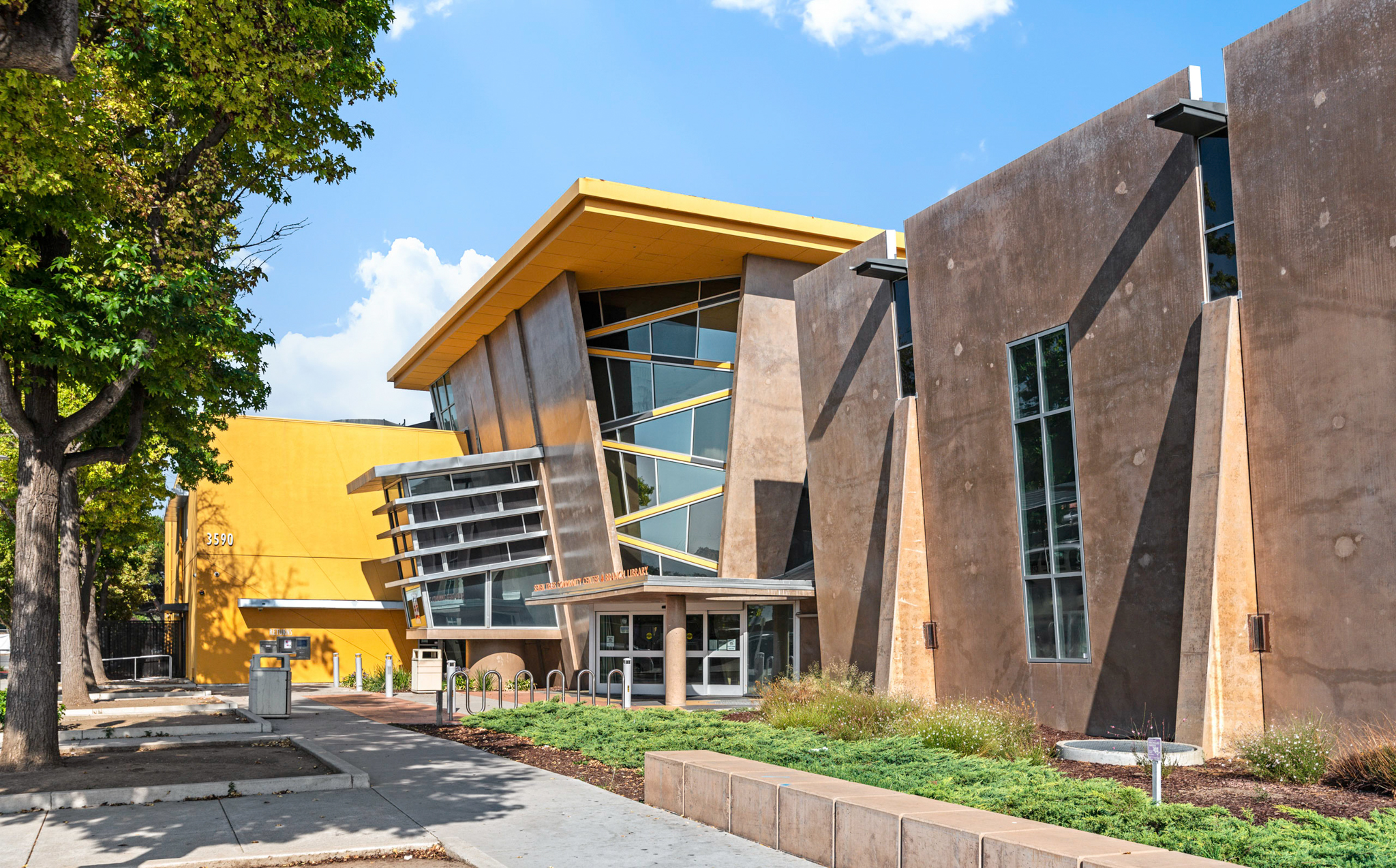
Seven Trees

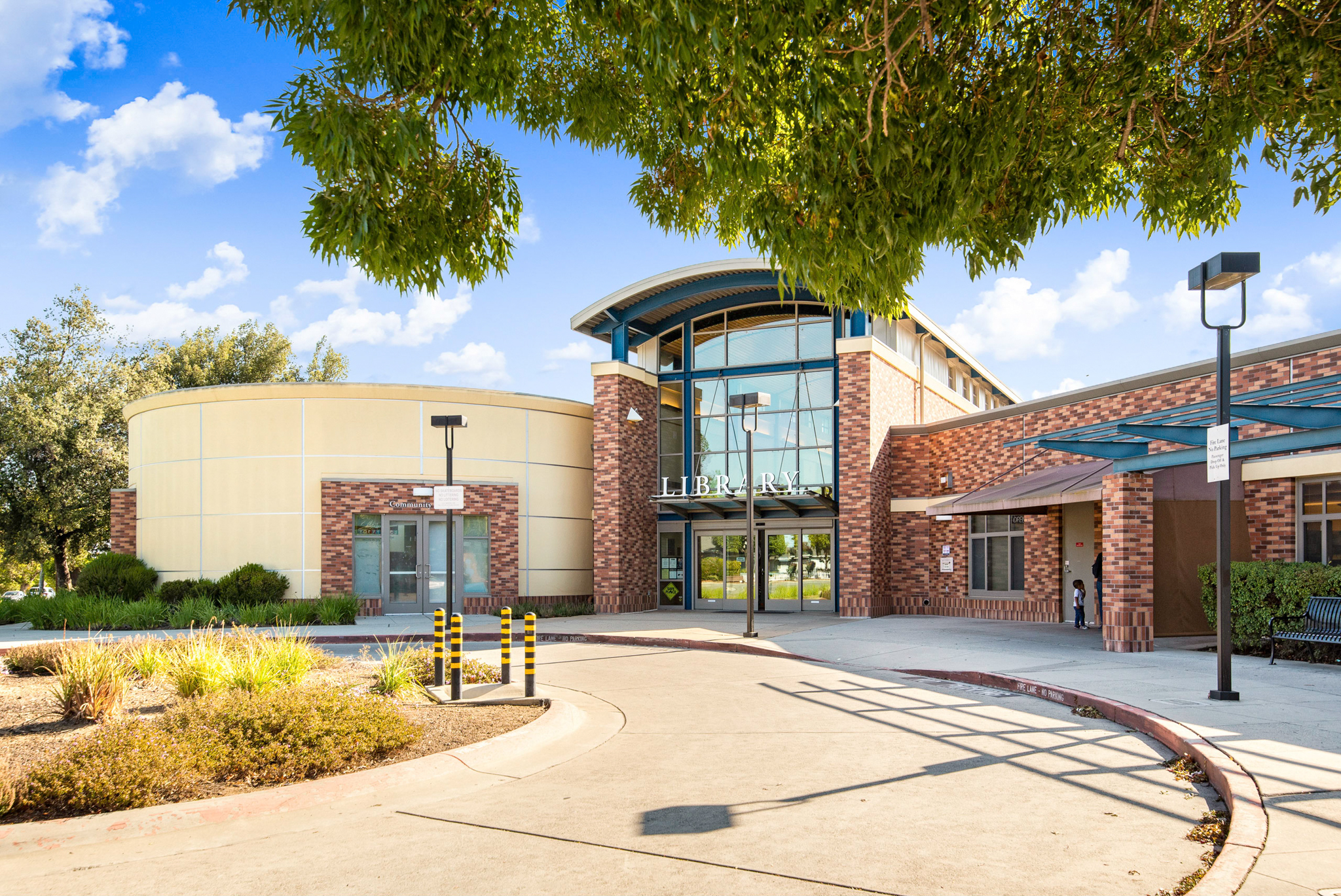
Vineland Branch

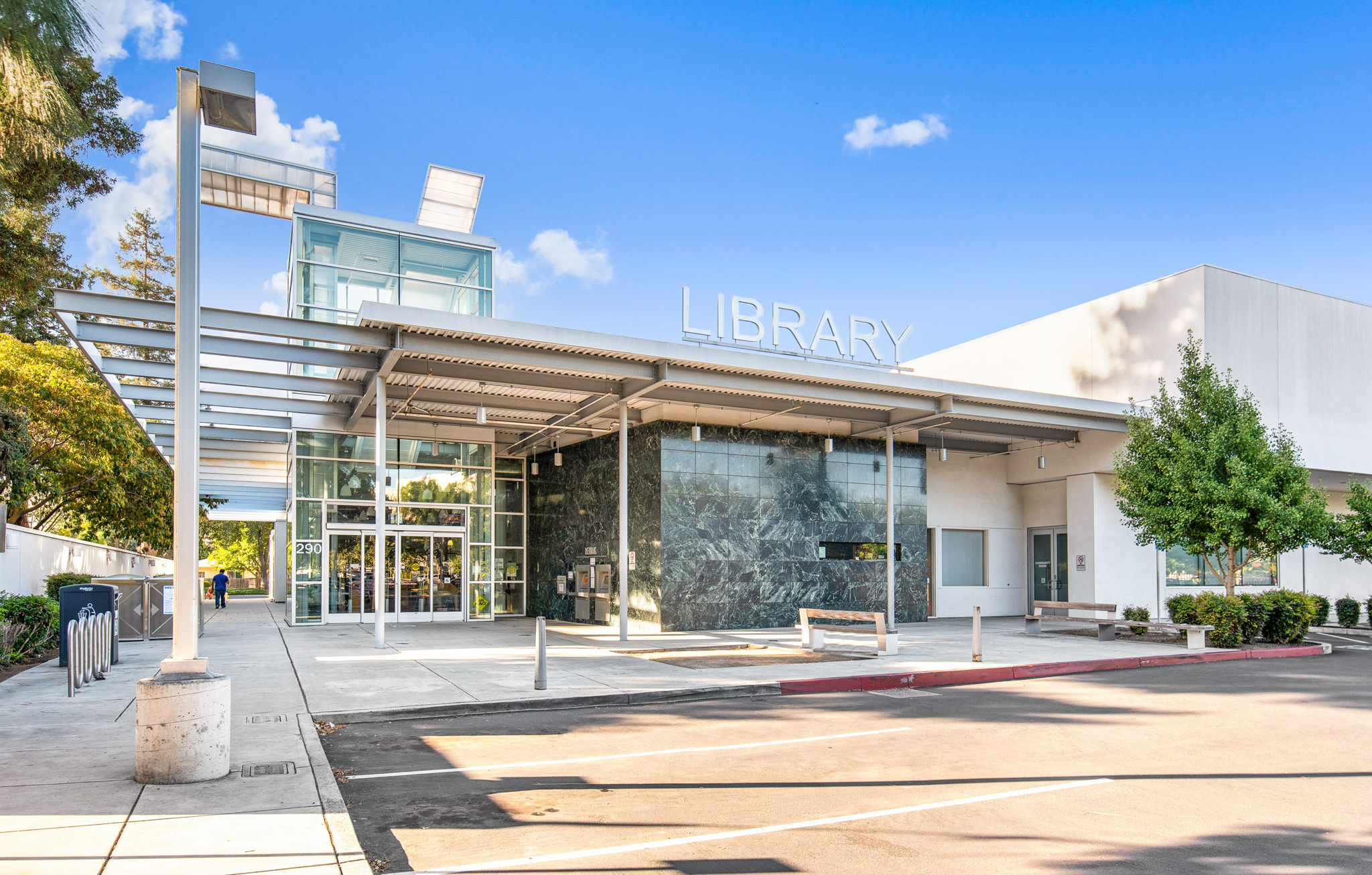
Santa Teresa Branch

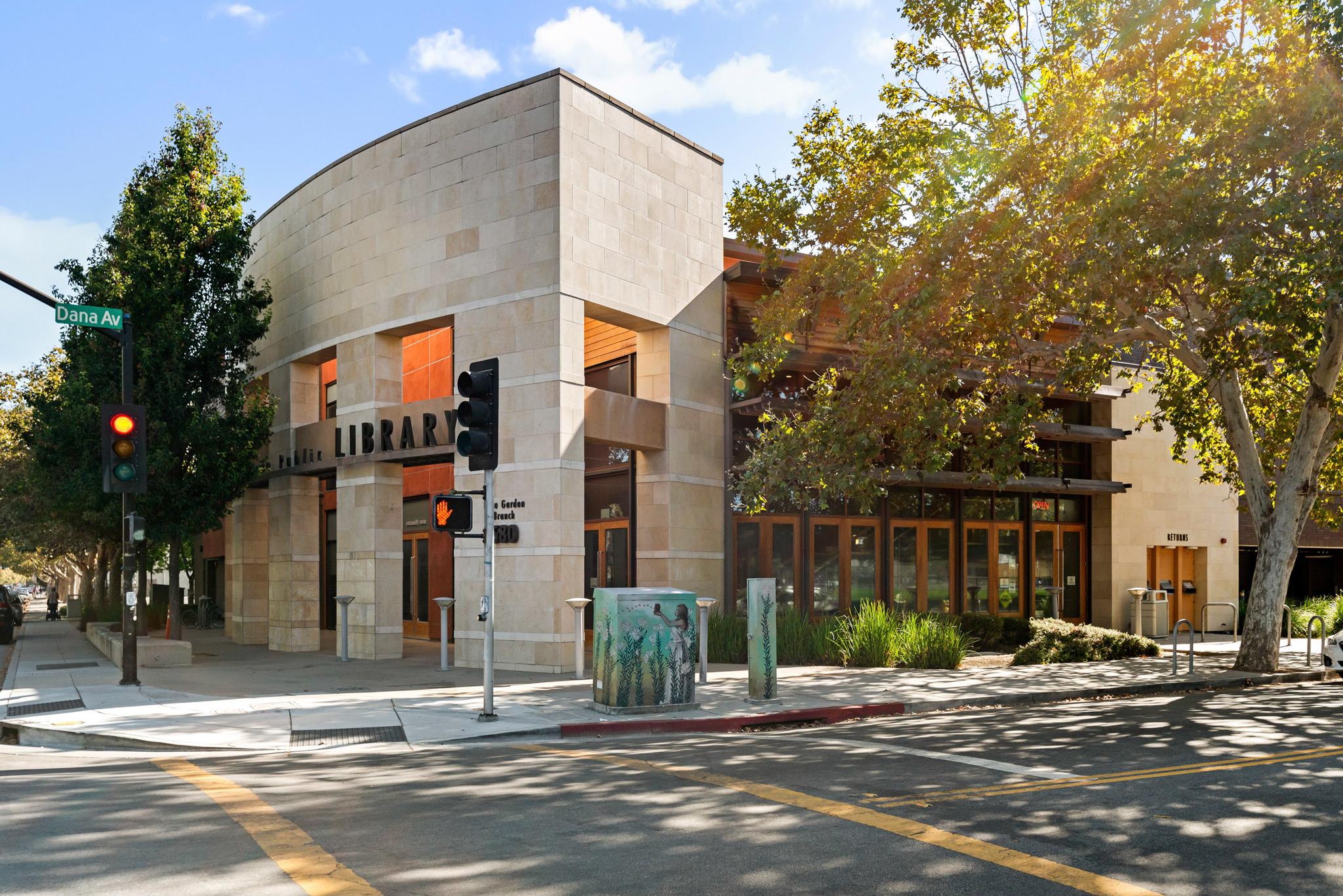
Rose Garden Branch

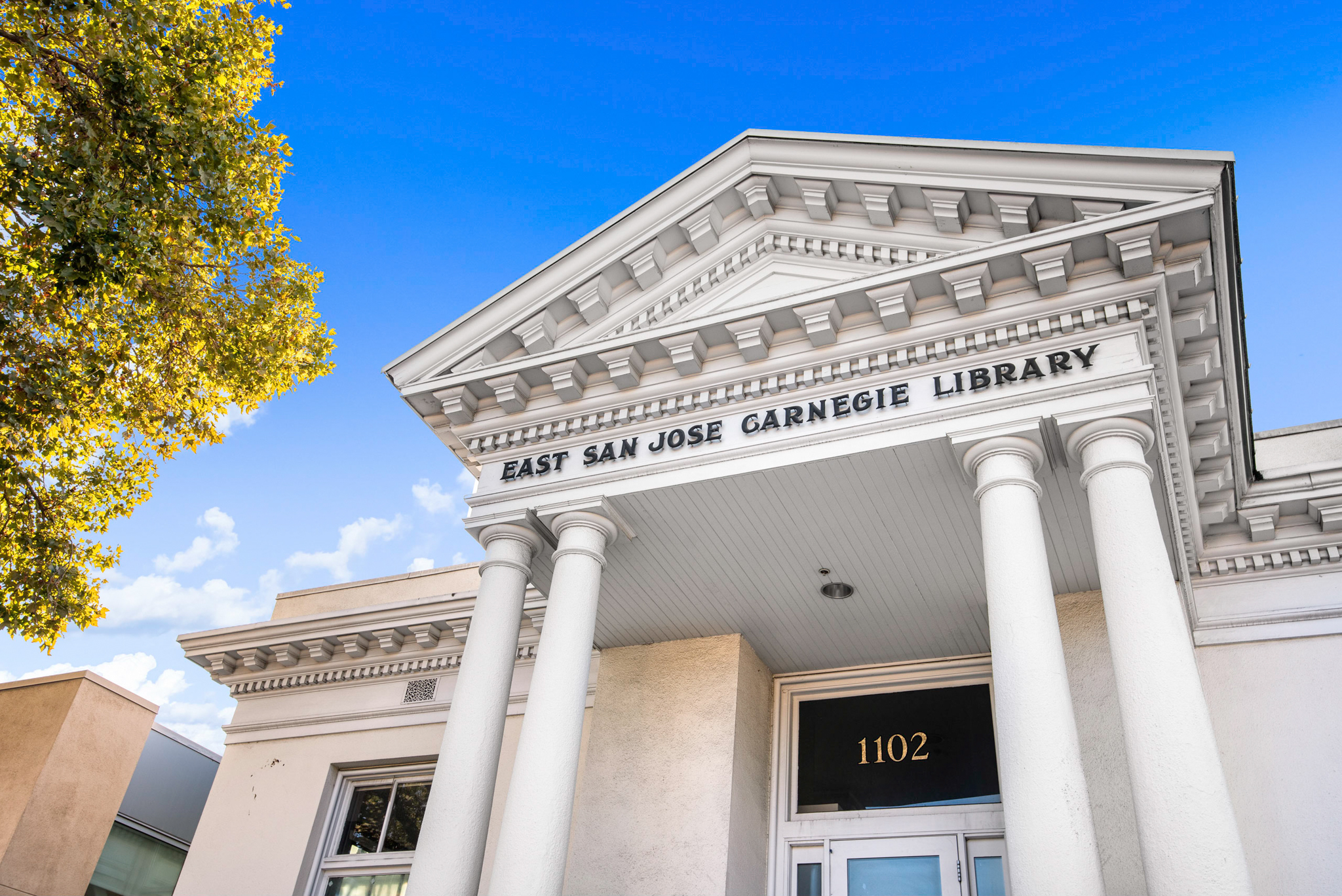
East San José Carnegie Branch

== See also ==
- Santa Clara County Library District
