= Dr. Martin Luther King Jr. Library =

Public library in San Jose, California, US

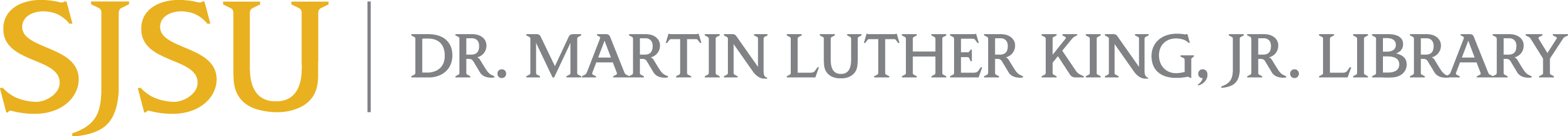

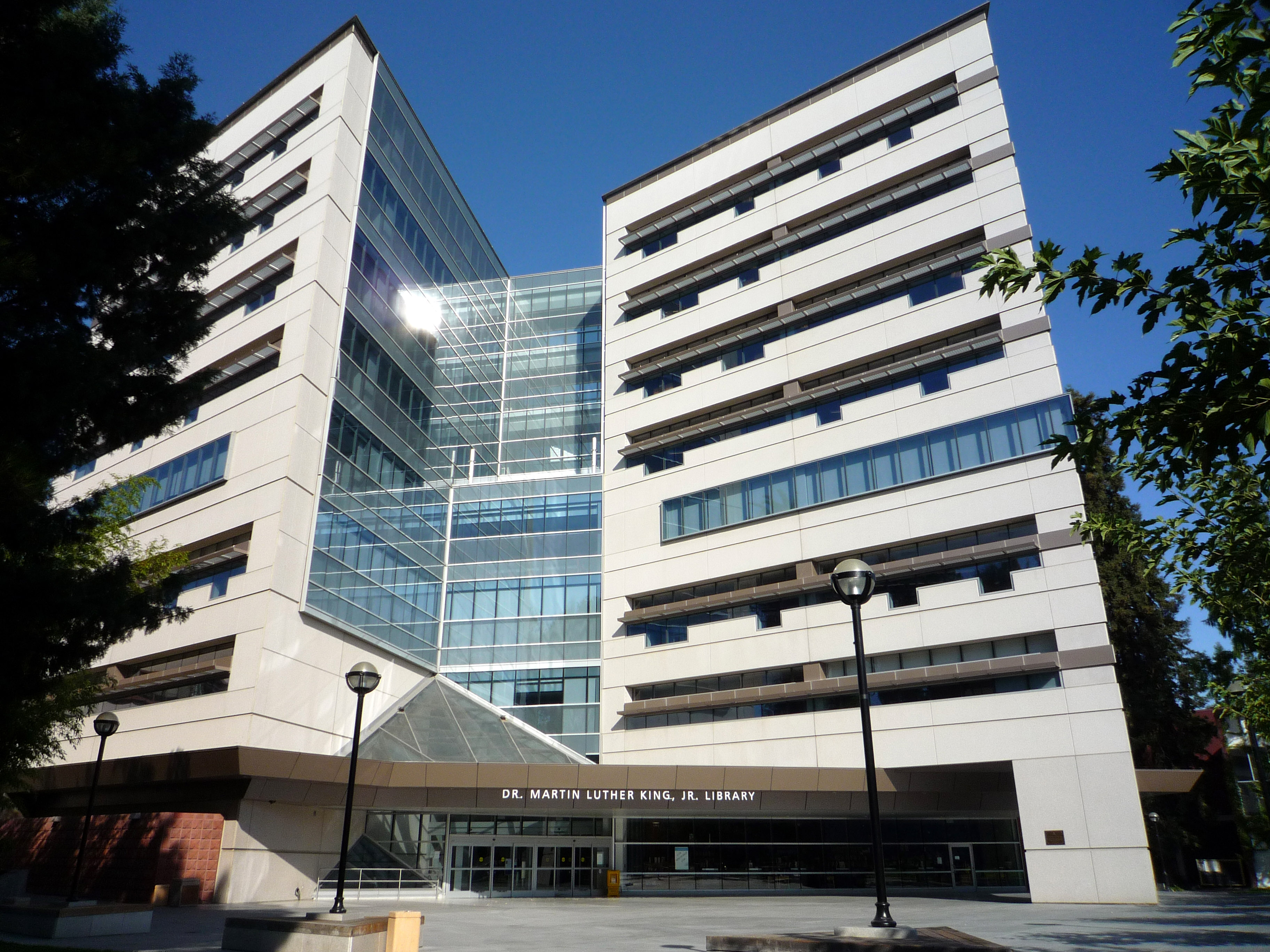
- Campus entrance to the library
- 37.33545°N 121.88496°W
- Location: 150 East San Fernando Street; San Jose, California; 95112
- Type: Public
- Established: 2003

Collection
- Size: 1.6 million volumes

Access and use
- Population served: City of San Jose; San Jose State University

Other information
- Website: https://www.sjlibrary.org/

The Dr. Martin Luther King Jr. Library (also known locally as the MLK Library or the King Library) is an 8-story public library and university library, located in downtown San Jose, California, which had its grand opening on August 16, 2003. As of 2018, it is the largest library building in the western United States built in a single construction project, with over 475,000 square feet (44,000 m^{2}) of space on eight floors and approximately 1.6 million volumes. The King Library is a collaboration between the City of San José and San José State University: it is the main library for both San José State University and the San José Public Library system. In 2004 it was honored as Library of the Year by Library Journal and Thomson Gale, for its collaborative combination of the two functions as well as for the building. On its tenth anniversary in 2013 it was still the largest joint university-municipal library in the United States.

The library building can accommodate over 2000 visitors.

== Building ==
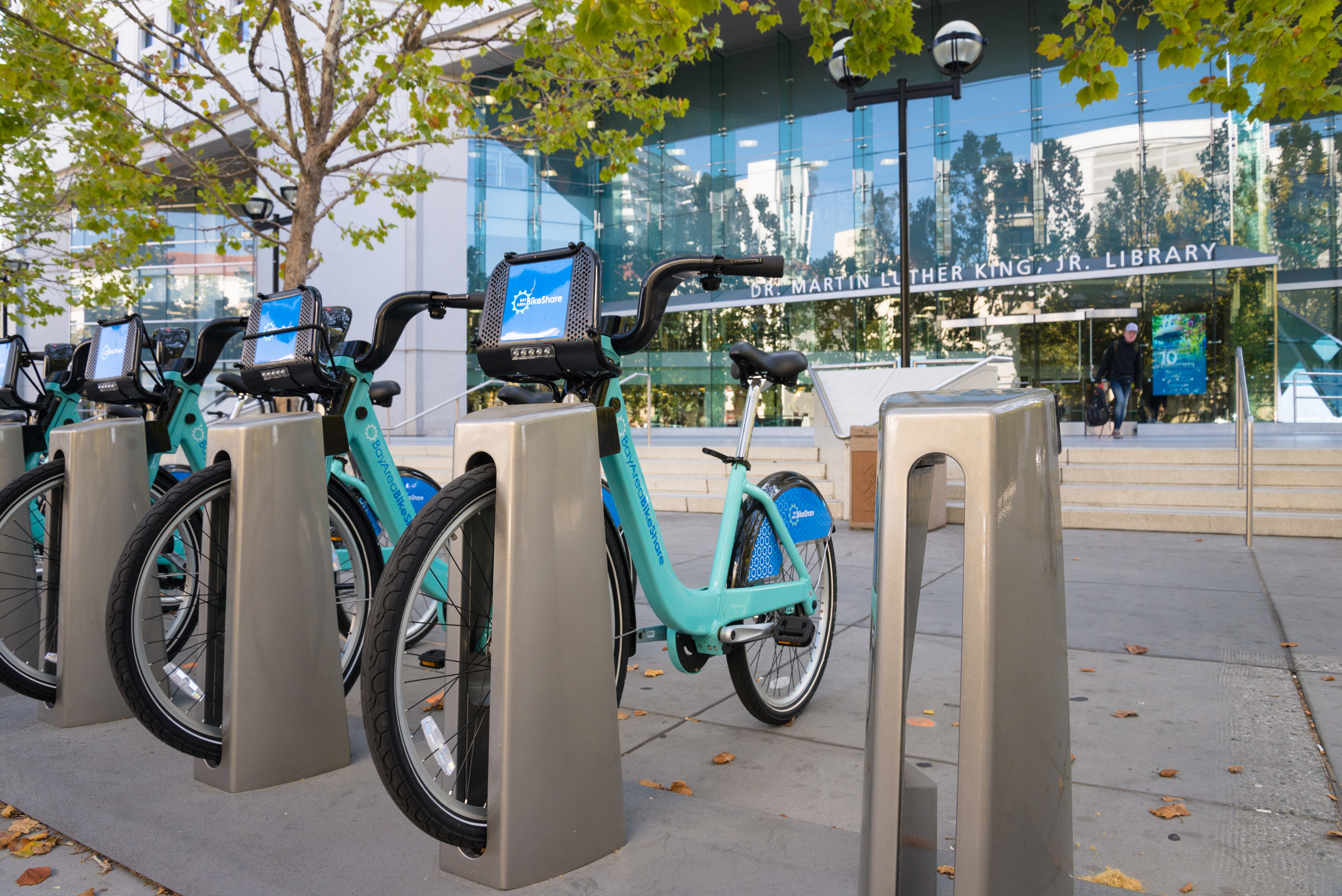
Ford GoBike Bay Area Bike Share outside the library on Santa Clara St.

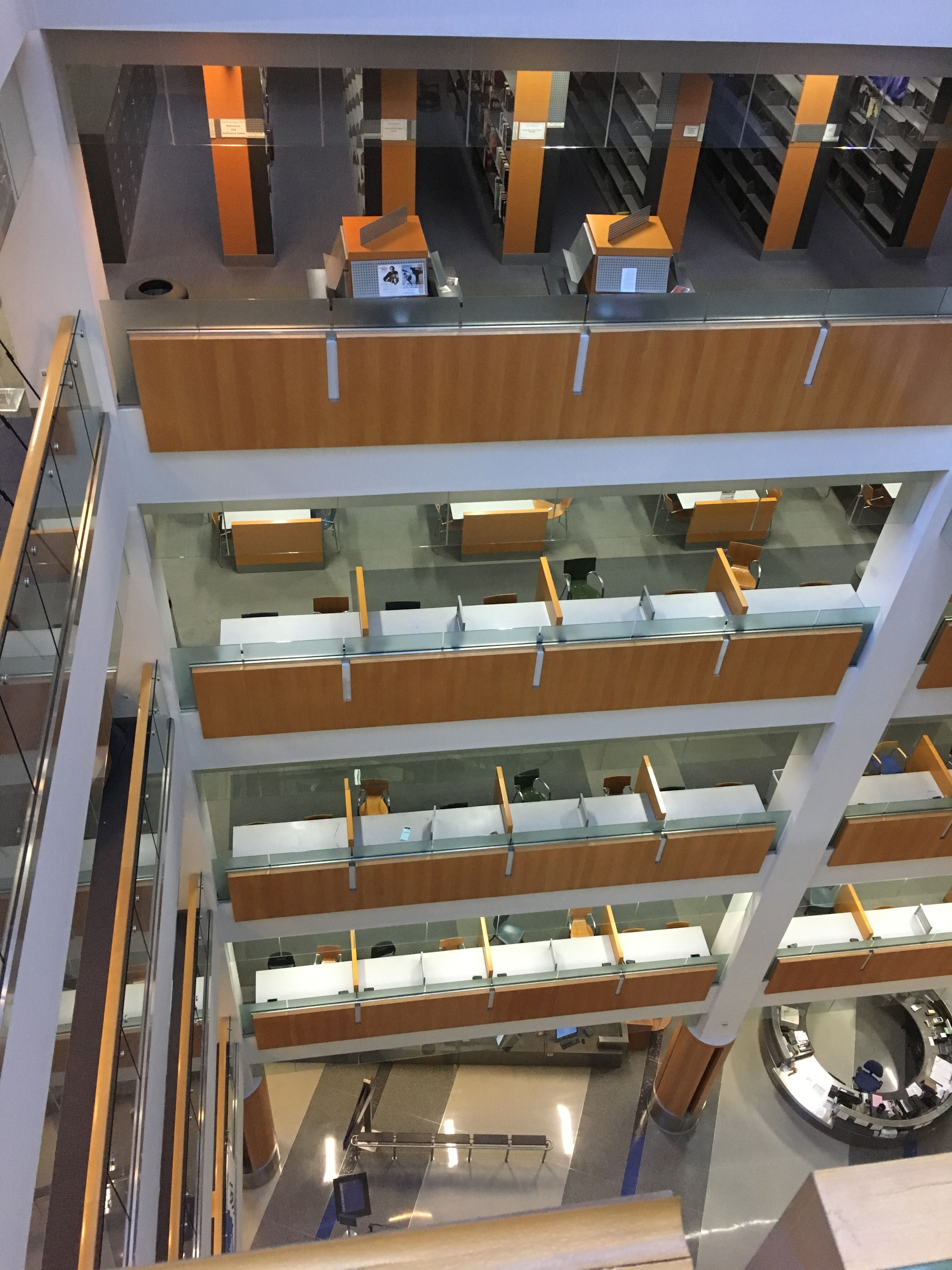
View of the atrium from the 6th floor.

The library sits on the site of the former Wahlquist Library, and before that, the Main Carnegie Library. The lower level (below floor 1) provides public computers, magazines and government documents. The reference collections are on floor 2. The volumes of the City Library system are shelved on floor 3. There, the non-fiction are indexed via the Dewey Decimal Classification and the fiction are sorted alphabetically by author's last name. The volumes of the University Library (known also as the Research Collection) are shelved on floors 6 to 8 and are indexed via the Library of Congress Classification System. Some duplicate volumes exist in both systems.

The center of the building is known as the Koret Atrium. On floor 1, in the atrium, a large LED display shows in real time the number of item loans (books and other media such as CDs and DVDs) that the entire City Library System has made since 2000. As of February 2025, that display showed a figure of over 240 million.

The lower level, second and third floors are where the majority of the public computers are located.

The fourth floor is dedicated to students with their laptops, and the lower floors provide large round tables for people to meet at. All floors except floor 1 provide individual alcoves for students or members of the public who are engaged in research for their studies. Floors 6 and 8 are "quiet study floors" and floor 7 is a "silent study floor".

=== Public art ===
Throughout the library are artworks by Mel Chin; the title of the series is Recolecciones (Spanish for "recollections").

On May 5, 2003, San Jose State's board of regents voted to name the plaza in front of the library the Robert L. Caret Plaza, after former university president Robert Caret.

== Library ==
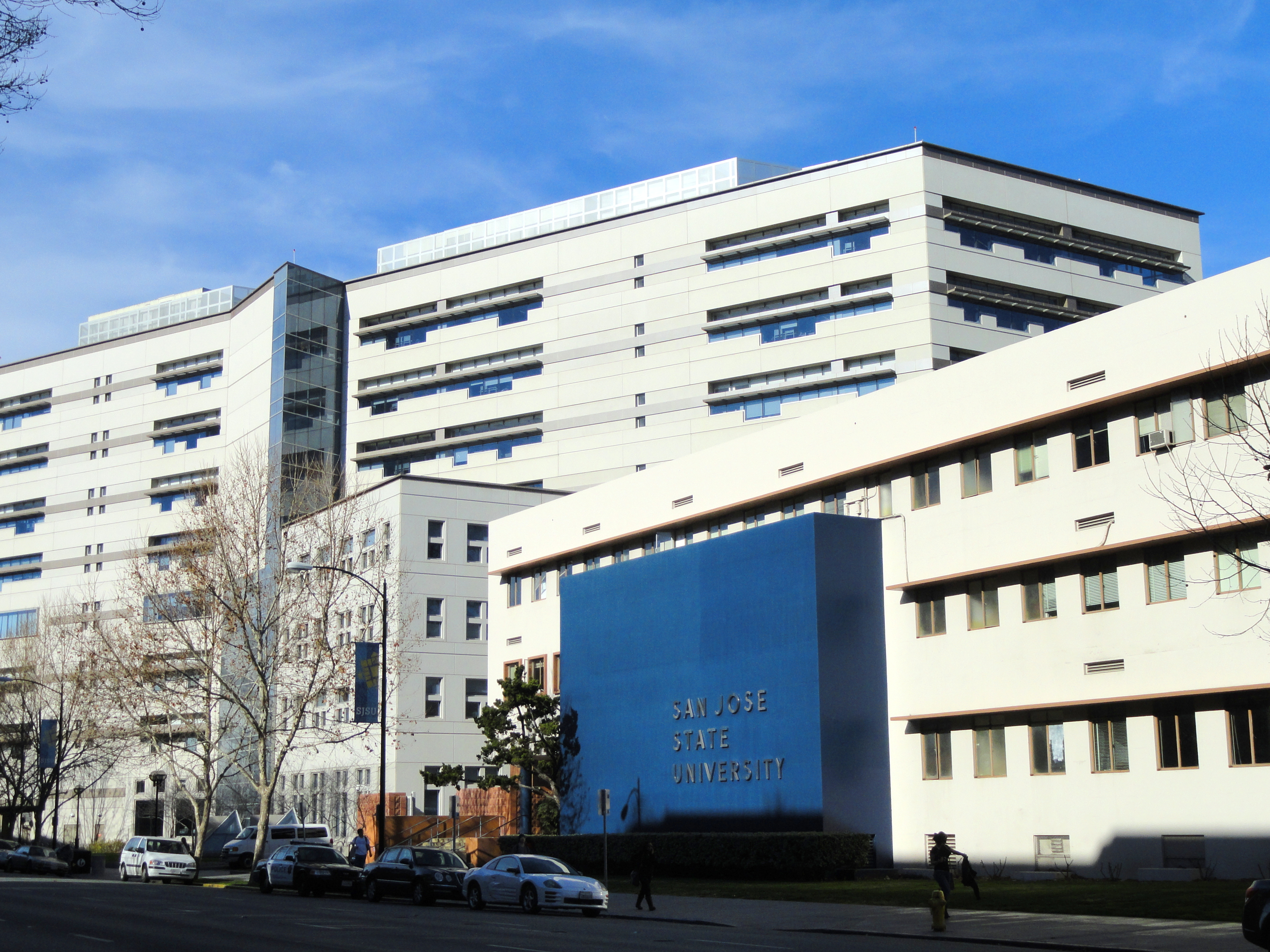
The MLK Library serves as San Jose State University's campus library.

=== Special collections ===
Special collections within the library include, all on the 5th floor, the Ira F. Brilliant Center for Beethoven Studies, the Martha Heasley Cox Center for Steinbeck Studies, a California History Room, and the SJSU Special Collections & Archives. There is also the Dr. Martin Luther King Jr. Civil Rights Collection on the 3rd floor.

=== Computing and printing services ===
The library provides public computers and an online reservation system to reserve time on them. Students can also reserve study rooms through a similar online system. The computers are configured with Traditional Chinese input methods and input methods for some European languages. Some public computers are configured to access the library card catalog and other services only.

In the Koret Atrium on floor 1, there is a kiosk of eight public computers with Internet access for which a library card is not required. These are configured so that use is limited to 15 minutes at a time.

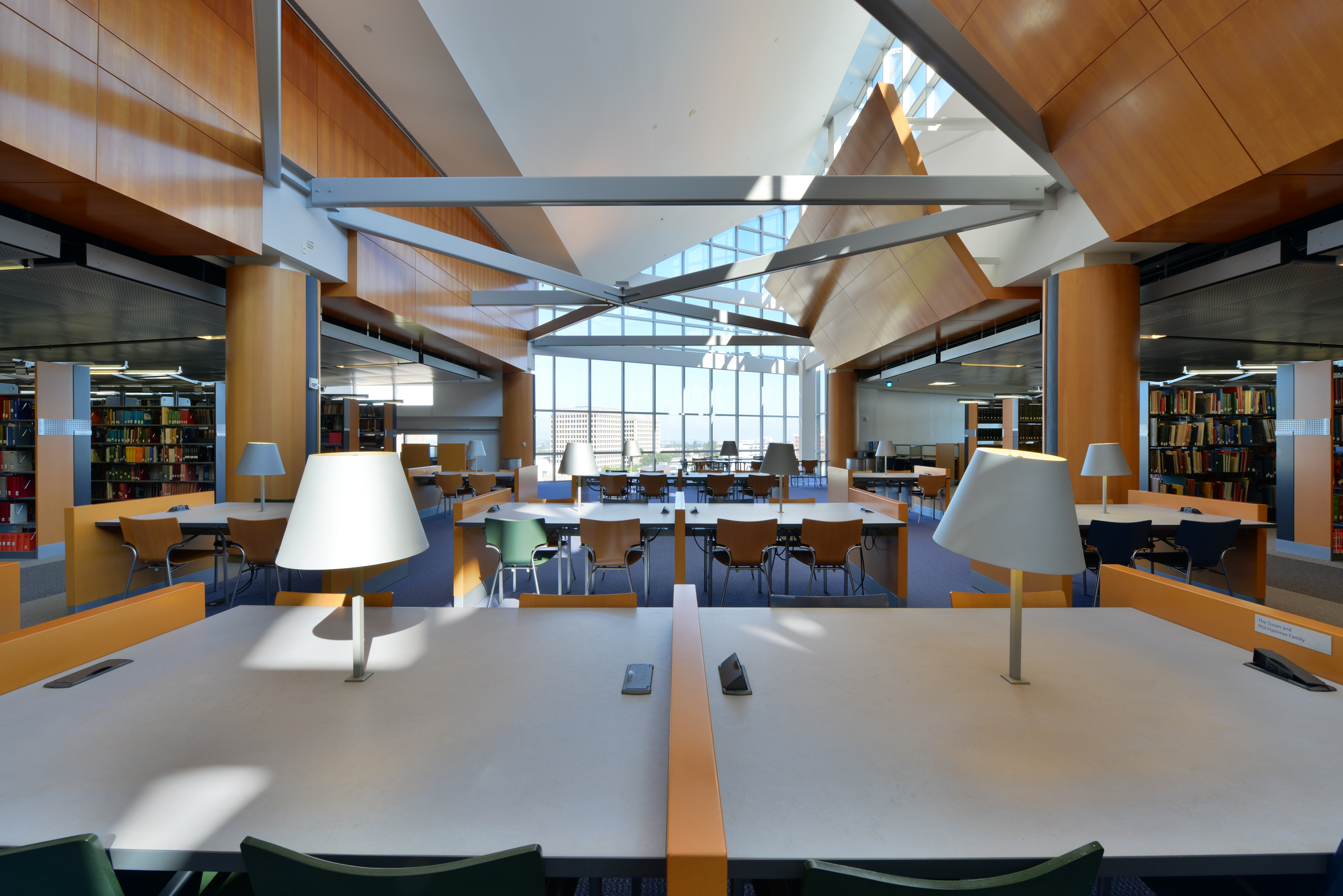
The 8th floor stacks and study space.

The lower level has about 20 public computers, and floors 2 and 3 about 50 public computers each. Login to these computers requires a San Jose city library card number and PIN. Access time is nominally limited to 2 hours per day per library card, but at the end of the session, if less than 90% of the public computers are busy, the user is granted another hour of session time; such extensions can continue as long as the library remains open. Login sessions of public computer users are automatically terminated when the library closes to the public.

All floors are equipped with Wi-Fi service. The public, unencrypted SSID is "King_Library_WIFI".

Cash-only print release stations and printers are available on floor 1 and other floors. Some print stations can be operated with print cards. Cash-only copiers are available on most floors.

=== Student life ===
The library is a major nexus point for student life at SJSU. Students often arrive with their laptops and engage in study groups both at tables and in study rooms.

During designated portions of the school year, after the library is closed for the day to the public, it remains open for "extended study hours" (24 hours) to SJSU students, staff and faculty.

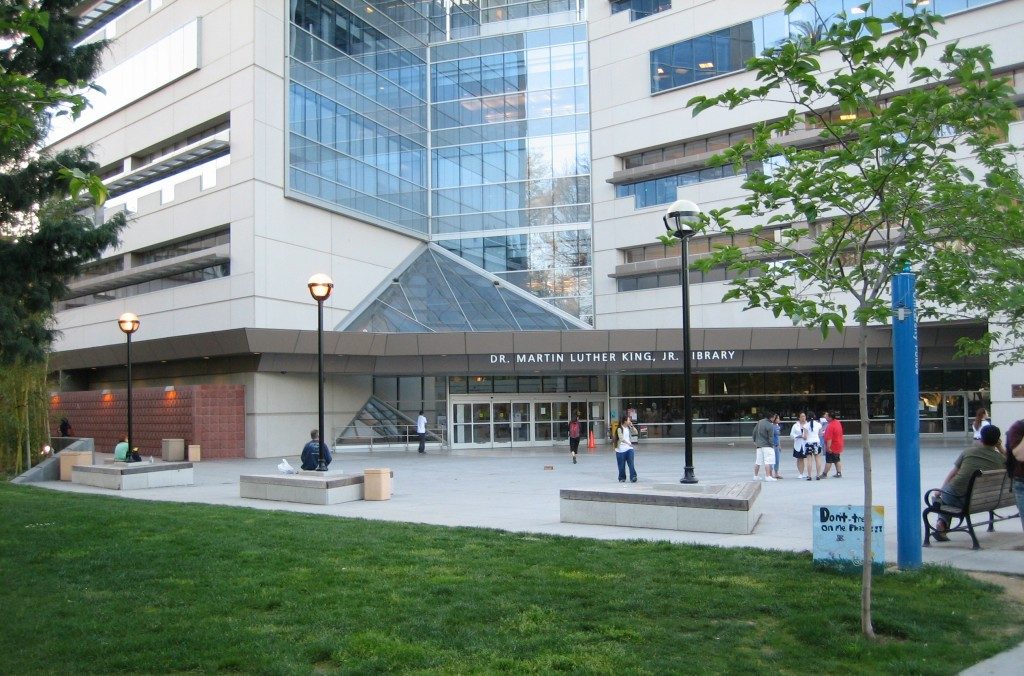
The Robert L. Caret Plaza, in front of the southeast entrance

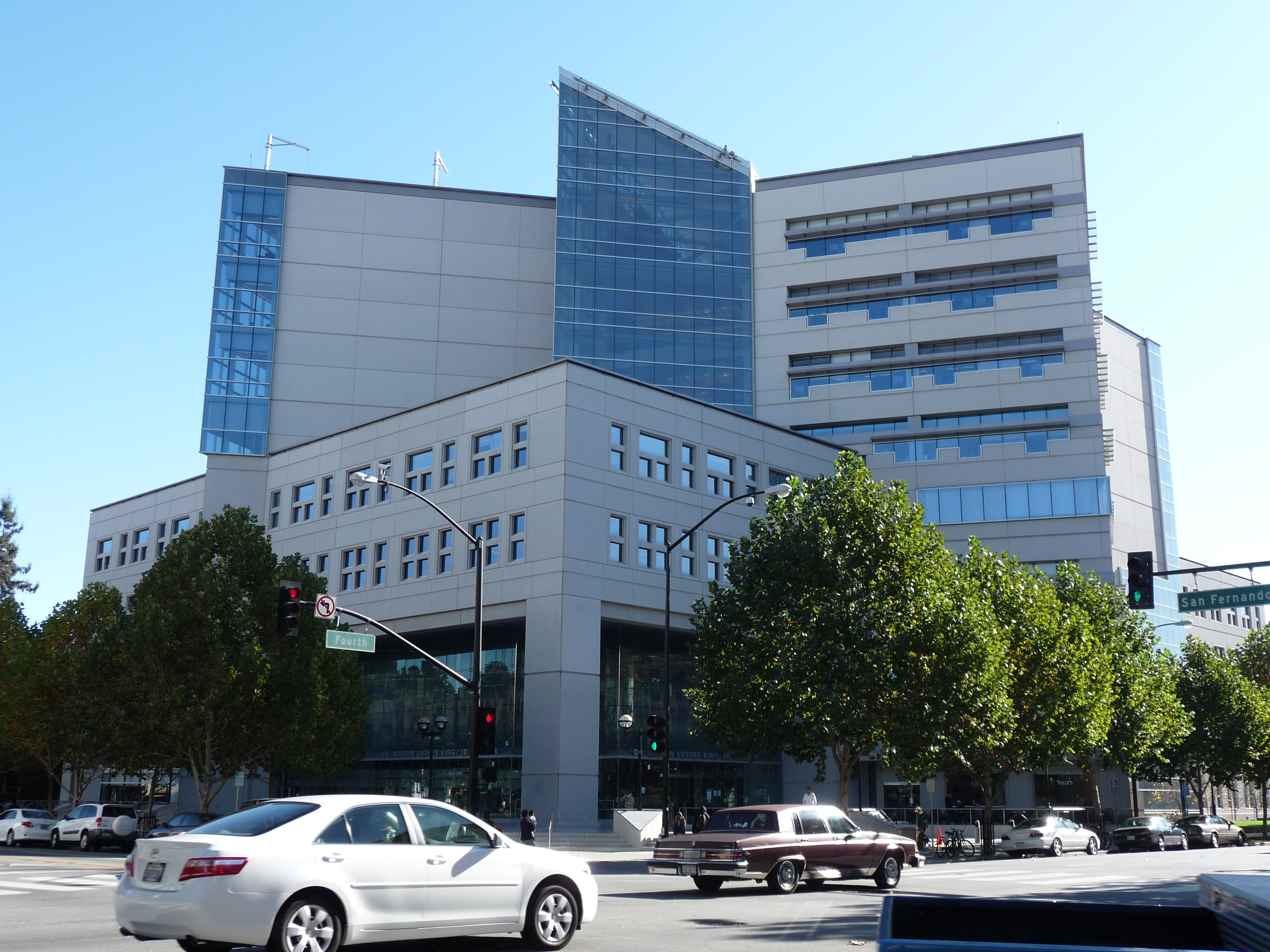
Main street-side (northwest) entrance

== See also ==
- List of memorials to Martin Luther King Jr.
