= GAFL =

GAFL can stand for:

- Gyeonggi Academy of Foreign Languages, a high school in South Korea.
- Gove Australian Football League, an Australian rules football competition based around Nhulunbuy, Northern Territory.
