= National Collegiate Players =

American theatre honor society (defunct)

- ΠΕΔ
- Founded: June 8, 1919; 107 years ago University of Wisconsin
- Type: Honor
- Former affiliation: ACHS
- Status: Defunct
- Defunct date: c. 1990
- Emphasis: Theatre
- Scope: National
- Motto: Palamay en Drama "Art in Drama"
- Publication: Players
- Chapters: 88
- Members: 15,000+ lifetime
- Headquarters: Akron, Ohio 44325; United States

National Collegiate Players, also known as Pi Epsilon Delta (ΠΕΔ), was an American co-educational honor society for participants in collegiate theatre. It was founded in 1919 at the University of Wisconsin, finally going dormant around 1990.

== History ==
Pi Epsilon Delta was established at University of Wisconsin on June 8, 1919, by students who were interested in theater. The first group contained seventeen men and women, including four faculty members. Its first president was Ray E. Holcolm. Pi Epsilon Delta was established as an honor society to recognize and encourage collegiate theatre. Its activities included supporting dramatic performances, playwriting, and the study of drama and encouraging leadership in these fields.

By 1922, Pi Epsilon Delta had a total of five chapters, including added chapters at Washington University in St. Louis, University of Minnesota, and Northwestern University. In June 1922, Pi Epsilon Delta merged with Associated University Players to form National Collegiate Players. Associated University Players was founded in 1913 at University of Illinois and had chapters at Ohio University, University of Washington, and University of Oregon. All but its chapter at the University of Washington voted to join the merged organization.

The merger was facilitated by two faculty members at the University of Wisconsin, Gertrude Johnson, professor of the speech department and grand chancellor of Pi Epsilon Delta, and Merle R. Raines, an English instructor and grand secretary of the Associated University Players. Pi Epsilon Delta was an honorary society, while the Associated University players were a theatrical production group.

The ideals and scope of the new National Collegiate Players were identical to Pi Epsilon Delta's. However, all chapters were allowed to produce theatrical shows. The merged organization's name was adopted due to resistance to continuing the form of a Greek letter organization, viewed as another secret order.

The first chapter installed after the merger was Iowa State University in April 1923. The society established the Junior Collegiate Players for students at junior colleges at Stephens College in 1949. It also sponsored a Summer European Theatre Workshop for its members every two years starting in 1959.

By 1962, the Players had initiated some 9,000 members. The National Collegiate Players became an honor society when it joined the Association of College Honor Societies in February 1963.

In 1977, the Players had 44 active chapters and 44 inactive chapters. It had initiated 15,000 members. Its headquarters was located at the University of Akron in Akron, Ohio. The National Collegiate Players went dormant around 1990. (Note: Based on the lack of newspaper articles about chapter activities and member initiation. The University of Wisconsin at Eau Claire appears to be the last active chapter. It went dormant in 1989 according to its archive at the university library.)

== Symbols ==
The Pi Epsilon Delta membership emblem was a key that included the comedy and drama masks of ancient Greek theater and the Greek letters ΠΕΔ. Founding member Frances Allen Tucker designed the key. Its motto was Palamay en Drama or "Art in Drama".

The National Collegiate Players maintained the key and motto of Pi Epsilon Delta. Its publication was Players, which was first published in 1924.

== Membership ==
Students were admitted to the National Collegiate Players based on a point system for achievement in acting, construction, costuming, directing, playwriting, stage design, stagecraft, and the completion of courses in dramatic arts, speech, and literature at an accredited institution. This was a modification of the point system used by Pi Epsilon Delta before the merger of the two organizations.

Only upper-class women and men were eligible for membership which was limited to seven to twelve active members per chapter. Applications for membership were voted on by the local chapter and approved by the national council, thus providing both national and local recognition for members.

The Players also initiated honor members who had made significant contributions to academia or the theater profession.

== Chapters ==
Following is a list of the chapters of the National Collegiate Players, with inactive institutions indicated in italics.

| Number | Charter date and range | Institution | Location | Status | Ref. |
|---|---|---|---|---|---|
| 1 | 1922–1923; 1925 | University of Illinois | Urbana, Illinois | Inactive | (Note: This chapter formed from the founding chapter of the Associated University Players, established in 1913.) (Note: In 1923, the chapter merged with Mask and Bauble. The chapter went dormant due to a lack of interest but was, later, revived as a separate group from Mask and Bauble.) |
| 2 | 1922–1964 | University of Wisconsin | Madison, Wisconsin | Inactive | (Note: This chapter formed from the founding chapter of Pi Epsilon Delta, established on June 8, 1919.) |
| 3 | 1922 | University of Minnesota | Minneapolis, Minnesota | Inactive | (Note: This was originally a chapter of Pi Epsilon Delta.) |
| 4 | 1922–1930, 1941 | Ohio University | Athens, Ohio | Inactive | (Note: This charter formed from a chapter of the Associated University Players.) |
| 5 | 1922–1932 | Northwestern University | Evanston, Illinois | Inactive | |
| 6 | 1922–1958 | Washington University in St. Louis | St. Louis County, Missouri | Inactive | |
| 7 | 1922 | University of Oregon | Eugene, Oregon | Inactive | |
| 8 | 1923 | DePauw University | Greencastle, Indiana | Inactive | |
| 9 | April 1923–1934 | Iowa State University | Ames, Iowa | Inactive | (Note: Chapter formed from the local group Masqued Players.) |
| 10 | 1923 | Washington State University | Pullman, Washington | Inactive | |
| 11 | 1923 | Oregon State University | Corvallis, Oregon | Inactive | |
| 12 | 1924 | University of Nebraska–Lincoln | Lincoln, Nebraska | Inactive | |
| 13 | 1926 | University of Southern California | Los Angeles, California | Inactive | |
| | 1926 | University of Arizona | Tucson, Arizona | Inactive | |
| | 1926–1935 | Butler University | Indianapolis, Indiana | Inactive | |
| | 1926–1950 | University of Denver | Denver, Colorado | Inactive | |
| | 1926 | University of North Dakota | Grand Forks, North Dakota | Inactive | |
| | 1926–1945 | Adelbert College of Western Reserve University | Cleveland, Ohio | Inactive | |
| | 1927 | University of Kansas | Lawrence, Kansas | Inactive | |
| | 1927 | Southwestern University | Georgetown, Texas | Inactive | |
| | 1927 | Lawrence University | Appleton, Wisconsin | Inactive | |
| | 1927 | Muskingum University | New Concord, Ohio | Inactive | (Note: This chapter still operates as a local group.) |
| | 1927–1945 | Flora Stone Mather College of Western Reserve University | Cleveland, Ohio | Inactive | |
| | 1928–1943, 1950 | Grinnell College | Grinnell, Iowa | Inactive | |
| | 1929 | Earlham College | Richmond, Indiana | Inactive | |
| | 1929 | Monmouth University | Long Branch, New Jersey | Inactive | |
| | October 25, 1930 – 1941 | Cornell College | Mount Vernon, Iowa | Inactive | |
| | 1932–1950 | University of Iowa | Iowa City, Iowa | Inactive | |
| | 1935 | Wichita State University | Wichita, Kansas | Inactive | |
| | 1936–1950 | Texas Wesleyan College | Fort Worth, Texas | Inactive | |
| | 1936–1951 | Alabama College, State College for Women | Montevallo, Alabama | Inactive | |
| | 1937–1951 | University of Alabama | Tuscaloosa, Alabama | Inactive | |
| | 1938 | Hamline University | Saint Paul, Minnesota | Inactive | |
| | 1938–1950 | Wayne State University | Detroit, Michigan | Inactive | |
| | 1941 | St. Olaf College | Northfield, Minnesota | Inactive | |
| | 1941 | Tulane University | New Orleans, Louisiana | Inactive | |
| | 1942 | St. Catherine University | Saint Paul, Minnesota | Inactive | |
| | 1943 | MacMurray College | Jacksonville, Illinois | Inactive | |
| | 1945–1947, 1958 | George Washington University | Washington, D.C. | Inactive | |
| | April 22, 1945 | Kansas State University | Manhattan, Kansas | Inactive | (Note: Chapter formed from the local group, Kansas State Players.) |
| | 1945 | Louisiana State University | Baton Rouge, Louisiana | Inactive | |
| | 1946 | Drury University | Springfield, Missouri | Inactive | |
| | March 9, 1947 – 1989 | University of Wisconsin–Eau Claire | Eau Claire, Wisconsin | Inactive | |
| | 1947 | Beloit College | Beloit, Wisconsin | Inactive | |
| | 1947–1957 | George Pepperdine College | Los Angeles County, California | Inactive | |
| | 1947 | University of Maryland, College Park | College Park, Maryland | Inactive | |
| | 1947 | University of Arkansas | Fayetteville, Arkansas | Inactive | |
| | 1948 | College of Wooster | Wooster, Ohio | Inactive | |
| | 1948 | Southern Illinois University Carbondale | Carbondale, Illinois | Inactive | |
| | 1948 | University of South Dakota | Vermillion, South Dakota | Inactive | |
| | 1948 | Southeast Missouri State University | Cape Girardeau, Missouri | Inactive | |
| | 1948 | University of Florida | Gainesville, Florida | Inactive | |
| | 1949–1953 | Florida Southern College | Lakeland, Florida | Inactive | |
| | 1949 | Gustavus Adolphus College | St. Peter, Minnesota | Inactive | |
| | 1949–1952 | Northern Idaho College of Education | Lewiston, Idaho | Inactive | |
| | 1950 | Mankato State University | Mankato, Minnesota | Inactive | |
| | 1951 | Hope College | Holland, Michigan | Inactive | |
| | 1951 | University of Toledo | Toledo, Ohio | Inactive | |
| | 1951 | Macalester College | Saint Paul, Minnesota | Inactive | |
| | 1951 | Emporia State University | Emporia, Kansas | Inactive | |
| | 1951 | University of Vermont | Burlington, Vermont | Inactive | |
| | 1951 | Capital University | Bexley, Ohio | Inactive | |
| | 1952 | Ohio State University | Columbus, Ohio | Inactive | |
| | 1952 | University of Montana | Missoula, Montana | Inactive | |
| | 1954 | University of Wisconsin–Milwaukee | Milwaukee, Wisconsin | Inactive | |
| | 1956 | Elmira College | Elmira, New York | Inactive | |
| | 1957 | Southeastern Louisiana University | Hammond, Louisiana | Inactive | |
| | 1958 | Millikin University | Decatur, Illinois | Inactive | |
| | 1958 | Augsburg University | Minneapolis, Minnesota | Inactive | |
| | 1959 | St. Cloud State University | St. Cloud, Minnesota | Inactive | |
| | 1959 | Southern Connecticut State University | New Haven, Connecticut | Inactive | |
| | 1960 | Cornell University | Ithaca, New York | Inactive | |
| | 1961 | Queens College, City University of New York | Queens, New York | Inactive | |
| | 1961 | Ouachita Baptist University | Arkadelphia, Arkansas | Inactive | |
| | 1961 | Arkansas Tech University | Russellville, Arkansas | Inactive | |
| | 1961 | University of Wisconsin–Oshkosh | Oshkosh, Wisconsin | Inactive | |
| | 1962 | University of Akron | Akron, Ohio | Inactive | |
| | May 26, 1962 | Winona State University | Winona, Minnesota | Inactive | |
| | 1963 | Arizona State University | Tempe, Arizona | Inactive | |
| | 1963 | California State University, Long Beach | Long Beach, California | Inactive | |
| | 1963 | University of Missouri–Kansas City | Kansas City, Missouri | Inactive | |
| | 1963 | Wake Forest University | Winston-Salem, North Carolina | Inactive | |
| | 1964 | Western Illinois University | Macomb, Illinois | Inactive | |
| | 1965 | Stephens College | Columbia, Missouri | Inactive | |
| | 1966 | California State University, Fresno | Fresno, California | Inactive | |
| | 1966 | East Carolina University | Greenville, North Carolina | Inactive | |
| | 1966 | West Virginia University | Morgantown, West Virginia | Inactive | |
| | 1967 | California State University, Sacramento | Sacramento, California | Inactive | |
| | 1969 | Northern Illinois University | DeKalb, Illinois | Inactive | |
| | 1974 | Wartburg College | Waverly, Iowa | Inactive | |

== Notable members ==
=== Collegiate ===
- Mary Wickes (Washington University), actress
- Anne Simley, academic and founder of the theater department at Hamline University
- Haila Stoddard (University of Southern California), actress, producer, writer and director
- Jon Whitmore (Washington State University) chief executive officer of ACT and president of Texas Tech University and San José State University

=== Honorary ===
- Judith Anderson, stage and film actress
- Henry Fonda, actor
- Helen Hayes, actress
- Cedrick Hardwick, stage and film actor
- Charles Laughton, actor and director
- Raymond Massey, actor
- Agnes Moorhead, actress
- Tyrone Power, actor
- Basil Rathbone, actor
