= Achievement test =

Test of developed skill or knowledge

An achievement test is a test of developed skill or knowledge. The most common type of achievement test is a standardized test developed to measure skills and knowledge learned in a given grade level, usually through planned instruction, such as training or classroom instruction. Achievement tests are often contrasted with tests that measure aptitude, a more general and stable cognitive trait.

Achievement test scores are often used in an educational system to determine the level of instruction for which a student is prepared. High achievement scores usually indicate a mastery of grade-level material, and the readiness for advanced instruction. Low achievement scores can indicate the need for remediation or repeating a course grade.

Under No Child Left Behind, achievement tests have taken on an additional role of assessing proficiency of students. Proficiency is defined as the amount of grade-appropriate knowledge and skills a student has acquired up to the point of testing. Better teaching practices are expected to increase the amount learned in a school year, and therefore to increase achievement scores, and yield more "proficient" students than before.

When writing achievement test items, writers usually begin with a list of content standards (either written by content specialists or based on state-created content standards) which specify exactly what students are expected to learn in a given school year. The goal of item writers is to create test items that measure the most important skills and knowledge attained in a given grade-level. The number and type of test items written is determined by the grade-level content standards. Content validity is determined by the representativeness of the items included on the final test.

== See also ==
- Math-Verbal Achievement Gap
- Psychological testing
- Test (student assessment)
- High stakes test
- National Achievement Test
