= Gyeonggi Academy of Foreign Languages =

Foreign Language High School in Uiwang-si, Gyeonggi-do, South Korea

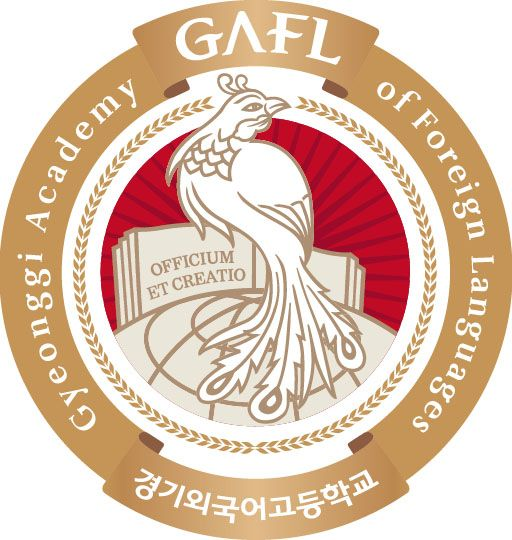

Location
- San, 21-2, Gocheon-dong, Uiwang-si, Gyeonggi Province, Korea
- Coordinates: 37°20′49″N 126°57′35″E

Information
- Former name: Myeongji Foreign Languages High School
- Type: Private, Boarding Foreign Language School
- Motto: Nurturing Creative Global Leaders Dedicated To Serve All Humankind
- Established: 2004; 22 years ago
- Principal: Sungeun Jun
- Symbols: Zelkova, Phoenix, Camellia
- Website: gafl.hs.kr

Gyeonggi Academy of Foreign Languages, or GAFL (경기외국어고등학교, 京畿外國語高等學校) is a foreign language high school located in Uiwang-si, Gyeonggi-do, Korea. It is equipped with two student dormitories, each for different genders, with its own dormitory inspectors as staff. Students are divided into eight classes per grade by language (English & Japanese, English & Chinese, Japanese, and Chinese) in which they would like to major. It was originally established under the name of Myongji Foreign Language High School on March 2, 2004, by Myongji Foundation. It was run as Myongji Foreign Language High School for 5 years, but due to declining financial situation of Myongji Foundation, the school was taken over by Bong-ahm Institute in 2008. Consequently, Bong-ahm Institute changed the name of the school to the current name of Gyeonggi Academy of Foreign Languages, with changes in various areas, including the principal, school uniform, dormitory inspectors and operation of school cafeteria. Although it kept the original subjects, or "majors", GAFL's international department changed the curriculum of its international curriculum department to International Baccalaureate Diploma Programme in 2011, making GAFL the first Korean high school to adopt the program. Currently, there are nine years worth of graduates, with alumni spread over diverse universities, including domestically prominent SKY (universities) and various universities abroad. The school is also well known for its high tuition fee, always being in the top 10 schools by tuition fee.

== Timeline ==
Year	Event(s)
2003	Sep.23 Myongji Foreign Language High School Established (24 classes)
2004	Mar.02 Opening and 1st Entrance Ceremony With 327 Students Education Foundation Dr. Hyesik Oh
2005	Feb.07 2nd Principal Dr.Hyeunok Yu Mar.02 2nd Entrance Ceremony with 347 students Sep.01 Education Foundation Dr. Yoenggu Yu
2006	Mar. 02 3rd Entrance Ceremony with 339 students
2007	Feb.04 1st Graduation 321 students Mar.02 4th Entrance Ceremony with 344 students
2008	Feb.13 2nd Graduation 315 students Mar.02 5th Entrance Ceremony with 347 students Sep.01 Education Foundation Hashik Park
2009	Feb.14 3rd Graduation 339 students Mar.02 6th Entrance Ceremony with 343 students
2010	Feb.11 4th Graduation 350 students Mar.02 7th Entrance Ceremony with 340 students Dec.30 The first acquisition of qualification to adopt IBDP (International Baccalaureate Diploma Program)
2011	Feb.10 5th Graduation 347 students Mar.02 8th Entrance Ceremony with 289 students
2012	Feb.09 6th Graduation 338 students Mar.02 9th Entrance Ceremony 270 students
2013	Feb.02 7th Graduation 337 students Mar.02 10th Entrance Ceremony 245 students Apr.1st 4th principal Seongeun Jeon
2014	Feb.13 8th Graduation 291 students Mar.3rd 11th Entrance Ceremony 265 students
2015	Feb.12 9th Graduation 270 students Mar.02 12th Entrance Ceremony 214 students

== History ==
=== Founding ===
Before the founding of the school, the school properties belong to a private high school, Jung-won High School, founded in 1989, but was bought by the Myeonji Education Foundation and was demolished of its establishment. After, the Myeongji Education Foundation intended to establish a new school, that of a Foreign Language High School (), where under Korean government plan was a special type of school to educate students with high level of foreign languages. As Myeongji Education Foundation was already in possession of various schools including Myongji University, the school quickly gained recognition among the high competition between Foreign Language High Schools.

=== Myongji Foreign Language High School Era ===
Myongji Foreign Language High School was a dormitory-based foreign language high school that accepted students from all over the country, mainly through its individual and unique admission tests. The students lived in the dormitory, and studied at night under the supervision of the dormitory inspectors, who were outsourced by the school. Remaining at school on weekends and during vacation was optional, but students had to follow a strict timetable that regulated activities most of the time. In the absence of school teachers, the dorm inspectors would take the place of chaperoning the students and their activities. To accommodate the students' needs, there were various facilities such as laundry room, gym, and a 7-Eleven convenience store (which was rumored to be the second highest branch in sales throughout all of South Korea) inside the school. The academic performance of Myongji students steadily improved over time, peaking at the 3rd highest in 2011 College Scholastic Ability Test in all of South Korea.

=== Gyeonggi Academy of Foreign Languages: former era (until 6th generation) ===
Myeongji Education Foundation faced a financial crisis during its attempt of expanding the business, hence was forced to handover the right to management of the school. This right was purchased by Daekyo Education Foundation, owned by Korea's prominent education company Daekyo (), and changing the present name, Gyeonggi Academy of Foreign Languages. With the conversion of the school into Gyeonggi Academy of Foreign Languages, the school took a drastic turn. In admissions, it could no longer test applying students in maths, and had to take into account their middle school grades to a larger extent due to change of government regulations. The school uniform also changed, from the previous 2 versions (winter and summer) to 3 versions (winter formal and casual, and summer). The school also scouted Hashik Park, a former vice-principal of Hankuk Academy of Foreign Studies and Hankuk Academy of Foreign Studies to be GAFL's new principal. Under Principal Park's running of the school, GAFL developed various student clubs, including a club pertaining to lacrosse. In terms of dormitory, staffing change was made in dormitory inspectors; the school hired a new group of dormitory inspectors that were regarded as a lot less strict than the group before. Amenities such as towels and laundry service were also made free to the students. However, the 6th generation of students still followed much of the same curriculum and education infrastructure as previous generations of students did.

=== Gyeonggi Academy of Foreign Languages: latter era (7th generation ~) ===
From this time period, the school took even more of a drastic turn. It could no longer accept students from provinces other than Gyeonggi due to change in government regulations. However, it was accepted to incorporate the International Baccalaureate Diploma Programme, one of the first Korean high schools to do so. This entailed a change of system and infrastructure for the students; as opposed to the past, the subjects, or "majors" were now divided into four categories containing local English, international English (IBDP), Chinese and Japanese departments.

== Symbols ==
=== Alma mater song ===
The schools alma mater song was written by the chairman of the Daekyo Education Foundation Young-jung Kang, where most of the lyrics are in Korean, but few phrases in English.

=== School symbols ===
The school chaplain of GAFL is the Zelkova serrate, which was chosen for its characteristics of an often used a shading plant in Korea. This was to symbolise the purpose of the schools value; educating the youth as the servant of the people.

Along with Zelkova, the flower was a Camellia lutchuensis, a symbol of strength as the Camellia endures the winters, and the floriography in Korea being humble heart, to symbolise the students of their strength endure through hard times, yet remembering the value of humbleness.

The school bird is a Phoenix (mythology), or 봉황 in Korean. To symbolise the everlasting sprit of the school. Because of this, the school board of parent donate a pair of Peafowl, which was kept within the school campus. Phoenix is discoverable in the coat of arms of the school and throughout the school logos etc.

== Departments of Major Languages ==
In both Myongji Foreign Language High School and GAFL, students were divided into classes centered around certain "majors", which meant that the classes pertaining to that major would receive more education on that area. Traditionally, there were 2 classes for each major, and these majors acted as major factors in school management and student activities by providing a clear boundary between groups of students.

=== Myongji Foreign Language High School ===
In Myongji Foreign Language High School, there were four majors: English (major) and Chinese (minor), English (major) and Japanese (minor), Chinese and Japanese. Each department received differentiated education according to the majors, including conversation and theoretical classes. The number of classes pertaining to the language was designed to escalate as the grades increased; such was the case that 3rd grade students had 5 different subjects pertaining to their major, for instance, English Writing, English Conversation, English Grammar, English Reading and English Listening. As students wishing for acceptance in foreign universities were few in number, they were incorporated into the main system, but could take optional classes and guidance on the side.

=== Gyeonggi Academy of Foreign Languages ===
GAFL was approved as World IB School in 2011, and unlike other IB schools in Korea, it is the only IB school where students can graduate with both IB Diploma and a Korean High School Diploma.

With the introduction of IBDP to the school, the major system also changed. The previously few students striving for foreign universities were promoted to a new major (international English), and the students striving for domestic universities were incorporated into local English courses. The IBDP is currently designed to address to the international English portion of the students.

==== English-Chinese Department ====
This is where English is the major language and Chinese is the minor language. The symbolic colour of the English-Chinese department is blue. This is the department were it constitutes the majority of the English department. Because of this factor, they have the slight advantage in determining the Korean High school GPA, which is relatively marked.

==== English-Japanese Department ====
Being only a size of one class, is the smallest department of the school. Having red as their symbolic colour. In the administrative system, often English-Japanese Department is categorised a one department with the International (IB) Department, but in terms of actual educational curriculum is completely independent from the International Department.

==== Chinese Department ====
Being represented with the colour black, the Chinese department majors in Chinese and English as a minor language. Chinese department is often associated with outgoing, strong images, specially showing a culture of strong bonds between the freshmen and the sophomore class. There are significant number of students in the Chinese department who move on to prominent Chinese or Taiwanese universities such Beijing University, Tsinghua University, National Taipei University.

==== Japanese Department ====
Being represented with the colour white, along with the Chinese department, the Japanese department is one of the biggest department and majors Japanese. Japanese department is often portrayed as the rival of the Chinese department, showing a very calm, and diligent image. Similarly, some students continue their academic in prestigious Japanese universities like University of Tokyo, Keio University, Waseda University.

==== International (IB Diploma Programme) Department ====
Being the smallest, yet the most support department of the school, International Department is the newest department of GAFL. Unlike most international schools in Korea, instead of adopting the SAT, or the Advanced Placement, has adopted the IB Diploma Programme for the first time as a Korean High school. Due to their different in curriculum, the International Department is granted of more independence and autonomy within the school. As the IB programme is constituted with 2 years, but the Korean High school system of 3 years, freshmen of International Department is enrolled in a Pre-DP curriculum provided by the school itself.

Unlike other departments where the minor language is fixed, the International department provides both Japanese and Chinese as minor language.

===== Offered Courses =====
As a Foreign Languages Highschool, IB students in GAFL are required to take 3 language courses within Group 1: Studies in Language and Literature and Group 2: Language acquisition. Thus students drop their Group 6: The Arts course at the end of DP1, and it is not included in final exam as well.

Courses offered:

Group 1: Korean Literature A (SL/HL), English Language and Literature A (HL)

Group 2: English B (HL), Chinese B (SL), Japanese B (SL)

Group 3: History (SL/HL), Economy (SL/HL)

Group 4: Biology (SL/HL), Chemistry (SL/HL)

Group 5: Mathematics Analysis and Approach (SL/HL)

Group 6: Film (SL), Theatre (SL)

== Student Life ==
=== Uniform ===
Being complete re-designed in 2008, GAFL's uniform exist in different forms. Largely into three categories that of Spring-autumn, summer, winter uniform.

Winter uniform includes a jacket, coat, vest, shirt, tie, cardigan, trousers, skirts for female students. The Spring-autumn uniform with a jumper, vest, shirt, trousers, tie, and skirts for female students. The summer uniform is worn with shirt with short sleeves, trousers, shorts, and skirts and ribbons for female students.

Along with seasonal differentiation, there are two types of uniform, that of formal and casual. Students may were what ever kind of uniform they choose, but on Fridays, it is mandatory that students dress in their formal uniform, including the jacket and with black dress shoes.

There are unofficial uniforms of the school that students wear, usually being the baseball jackets. Students often wear baseball jackets over their uniform to show their affiliation with the prefect committee, or society they belong to. There are no particular school codes on these jackets, but through tradition, it is only the prefect committees, societies that existed from the founding of the school, and sports society that wear them. There are few exception to this.

=== Prefects ===
The school's prefect system imitates that of a democratic government, meaning there is the legislative, executive, and judiciary branch. The legislative branch is formed with each classes president and vice president, led by a chairman elected among them and has the right to amend the school codes. The executive branch is led by the School president voted through a vote as the school in whole, and the president chooses members of the executive branch that carries out all school actives. The judiciary branch is chosen by interviews conducted by the previous members of the judiciary. They have the right to hand out demerit marks to students according to the school codes.

The international department gets the exception and is allowed to form the International department committee, led by chairman elected within the department. The international department committee is only formed with student of the international department and gains autonomy to the prefect system of three branches.

=== Societies ===
As the school is a Foreign Language High school, the societies are more concentrated into languages, and humanities. There are more than 100 societies in the school which is formed, and led by the students, answering to the executive branch. There are no official division between the societies of the school, but there is what the students traditionally call the 'classic societies', like the Law society, Debate society, United Nations society, English society, and Economic society, which refer to about 12 societies that existed from the founding of the school. These societies tend to be large in number, financial support from school, and gets more opportunities to host a competition, or an event.

Besides the academic societies, there are numerous sports and art societies. The major sport society is football, basketball, and lacrosse. Sport societies usually participate in high school leagues held among prestigious private schools as varsity teams. The art society include orchestra, band, hip-hop, and painting societies. Art societies annually hosts a festival where they put up plays, drama, performances for the students.

== Campus Facilities and Buildings ==
=== Main Hall ===
Being reused from the old building of the Jung-won High school, the Main halls is older than the school itself. This is where all of the class rooms are located except for the International department, along with most of the teachers' offices. On the ground floor of the Main hall is where the cafeteria is located where three meals a day is provided by the school including weekends. On the 1st floor is the School Memorial Hall, a place to remember and value the history of the school.

=== Bong-am Hall ===
Bong-am, being named after the school boards first chairman, Young-jung Kang, is the building that includes the school's convenience store, large studying hall, separate group seminar rooms, and an indoor basketball court, often used as a gather hall for school events.

=== Creation Hall ===
Creation hall, the first dormitory building of the school, is a 10 floor building located at the corner of the school's campus. When Creation hall was the only dormitory of the school, it accommodated both male and female students. However, due to its aging facilities of shower room, and air conditioning, the school later decides to build another dormitory building, and Creation hall only accommodating the male students from then. On the top floor of Creation hall locates a self-study area opened until 4 am, and an student lounge where students call eat, drink and relax as the dormitory codes prohibit consumption of food within each rooms.

=== Vision Hall ===
Vision hall is the newly built dormitory building with better facilities than Creation hall, accommodating the female students. Vision hall has total of 9 floors located right next to Creation hall. Vision hall is where the dean's night office is located on the ground floor, and has a garden at the rooftop, where the school holds annual event from time to time. In the basement of Vision hall is the laundry room, where the school provide free laundry service to students where they only have to pick their clothes up after school.

=== Global Hall ===
As recognisable from the name itself, the Global hall is the building where the international department is located. Because of this independent facility, the international department can use 12 classrooms, 1 teacher's office, 1 biology lab, 1 chemistry lab, film studio, theatre room, and 3 self study areas and a library. This is the first building that visitors see when entering through the school's main gate.

=== Servant Leadership Hall ===
Located in front of the Global Hall, Servant Leadership Hall is the newest building on campus, having the construction finished in 2021. This building is formed with 5 floor, having multiple classrooms, media room, and a gym on ground floor for the students use. This building was built to solve an old dissatisfaction of the students and faculty for the lack of teaching space. This building, due to the locational benefit, is mostly used by the international department, but also is used for multiple uses such as society activities.

=== GAFL Ground ===
GAFL Ground is the name for the indoor sports facilities located at the very north-west of the campus. Below the GAFL Ground is a parking lot used by the faculty, and above is the actual sports facilities. The sports facilities include 4 indoor badminton court, and two futsal fields, which is often used as a lacrosse field for the school's varsity team.

=== The Pathway ===
This is a distinct feature of the school's campus. The Pathway refers to the one singular indoor hallway that allows the students to navigate to all of the school's building. The Global hall is connected to the Servant Leadership Hall using a bridge, to the Vision hall by an underground pathway, the Creation hall through a roofed alley, and indoor hallway continuing all the way to the Main Hall. For this reason, no body uses an umbrella in the school.
