= Hankuk Academy of Foreign Studies =

Coordinates: 37°19′46″N 127°15′18″E

Hankuk Academy of Foreign Studies 용인한국외국어대학교부설고등학교 龍仁韓國外國語大學校附設高等學校
- Yongin, Gyeonggi Province; South Korea

Information
- Type: Private, Boarding; Foreign Language High School (2005~2010); Independent Private High School (2011~present)
- Established: 2004
- Principal: Jeong Yeong-woo
- Staff: 16
- Faculty: 103
- Grades: 10-12
- Enrollment: 1102 (2020)
- Campus: Rural, 53,000 m² (13 acres)
- Website: www.hafs.hs.kr

Hankuk Academy of Foreign Studies (abbreviated as HAFS; Korean: 용인한국외국어대학교부설고등학교; Hanja: 龍仁韓國外國語大學校附設高等學校) is a private boarding school located in the northern part of Yongin, South Korea, and is the first Korean high school formed by a collaboration between the government and a university. It is the most selective and prestigious boarding school in Korea, renowned for its high academic levels and successful college admission results.

== Timeline ==
- 2002 October 16 The mayor of Yongin Mr. Jeong-mun Lee and the president of Hankuk University of Foreign Studies (HUFS) Mr. Byeong-man Ahn(appointed Minister of Education, Science and Technology later, by President Lee Myung-bak) decides to create Hankuk Academy of Foreign Studies (한국외국어대학교 부속 외국어고등학교).
- 2002 December 6 The mayor signs a written agreement after making a rough draft and tuning it.
- 2003 November 27 Groundbreaking of Hankuk Academy of Foreign Studies takes place.
- 2005 March 3 The construction becomes complete, and the school inaugurates Mr. Bong-chul Nam as principal and admits first students.
- 2005 July 2 U.S. College Board designates HAFS as an official test center for PSAT, SAT, and AP.
- 2008 February 7 Graduation of class of 2008 takes place.
- 2008 Official Korean name changes from 한국외국어대학교 부속 외국어고등학교 to 한국외국어대학교 부속 용인외국어고등학교; the official English name remains the same.
- 2010 November 1 The second principal, Dr. Song-ki Kim, is inaugurated.
- 2011 HAFS becomes designated as an Independent Private High School (5-year-term)
- 2014 Official Korean name changes again from 한국외국어대학교 부속 용인외국어고등학교 to 용인 한국외국어대학교부설고등학교; the official English name remains the same.
- 2015 July 3 Re-designation of HAFS as an Independent Private High School is approved (5-year-term).
- 2018 The third principal, Jeong Yeong-woo is inaugurated.

== Founding ==
Hankuk University of Foreign Studies (HUFS) and the local government of the City of Yongin decided to fund constructions of the Hankuk Academy of Foreign Studies in order to stop the outflow of local students moving out of Yongin city for better education. The City of Yongin provided approximately $16 million in USD while HUFS yielded 13 acres (53,000 m^{2}) of its Yongin Campus. In return, the official Korean name of the school was to include both names of Yongin City and HUFS - the result of which is "한국외국어대학교 부속 용인외국어고등학교", literally meaning "Yongin Foreign Language High School Affiliated with Hankuk University of Foreign Studies", and Hankuk Academy of Foreign Studies is required to admit at least 30% of its freshmen from Yongin every year. In 2011, as the school was designated as an Independent Private High School, the official name changed into "용인한국외국어대학교부설고등학교", meaning "Yongin High School Affiliated with Hankuk University of Foreign Studies". Despite the changes of the official Korean name, the official English name remained the same as "Hankuk Academy of Foreign Studies".

== Staff ==
The school has 16 staff members, including the principal (Mr. Jeong Yeong-woo) and the vice principal (Mr. Park In-ho). The staff oversees a variety of work, from admissions to test coordinating to monitoring the dormitories.

== Faculty ==
The faculty consists of 103 members, divided into 7 departments (Korean, English, Foreign Languages, Social Sciences, Arts, Science, Math). Most of the members are highly qualified, several having worked for EBS, the national educational broadcasting system. Non-Korean faculties mostly teach conversation-based language courses. There is also a college counselor for the international division.

== College Matriculation and Academic Information ==
Hankuk Academy of Foreign Studies is widely known for its successful college admission results. In class of 2014, 96 students were accepted at Seoul National University, three students at Harvard University, two students at Princeton University and one student at Sciences Po Paris. 80 students in the class of 2016 were accepted at Seoul National University, and one student was accepted at Harvard, Yale, Princeton, and Caltech each.

The school has been designated as a PSAT, SAT, AP and ACT Test Center by College Board, and was the first GAC program to be conducted in South Korea.

== Foreign Language High School Period (2005-2010) ==
Hankuk Academy of Foreign Studies was first established under the system of Foreign Language High School. All students had to "major" a foreign language of choice, and 10 classes were divided according to the students' major.

Following describes divisions under the system of Foreign Language High School:

- English Major (Class 1-3): The curriculum followed US education system, with honors and AP courses provided. Most students prepared for admissions to colleges in US, while some entered colleges in UK, Korea, or Hong Kong.
- Asian-European Majors (Class 4-10): The entire curriculum was run under the standard Korean education system. Students prepared College Scholastic Ability Test for admissions to domestic colleges in Korea.
  - French Major (Class 4)
  - German Major (Class 5)
  - Chinese Major (classes 6-8)
  - Japanese Major (Classes 9-10)

As of 2011, the school system changed from Foreign Language High School to Independent Private High School, and the choice of foreign language is no longer the standard of dividing classes.

== Independent Private High School Period (2011-present) ==
Since 2011, the school's official educational status has been switched from a 'Foreign Language High School' to an 'Independent Private School,' thereby liberating itself from many governmental regulations forcing the school to simplify the admission process and specialize in foreign language education. As a result, the school gained more autonomy and flexibility in designing and implementing its curriculum, aiming to attract a greater body of talented applicants with diverse interests.

The school is divided into three divisions:

- International Track (Class 1): This division aims for admissions to colleges abroad, namely US, UK, or Hong Kong. The curriculum follows the US system. The number of classes for the International Track has changed from three to two as of 2014, Later changed to one as of 2019.
- Humanities & Social Science Track (Class 2-4): Abbreviated to Humanities Track, this division focuses on highly advanced education of literature, social science, and foreign language. Students in this division mostly aim for entrance to domestic colleges, while a few apply to foreign universities in Europe, Japan, or China. The curriculum follows the standard Korean education system.
- Natural Science Track (Class 5-10): This division encourages students to have in-depth study in the field of natural science including Biology, Chemistry, Physics, and Calculus, providing them with numerous opportunities to conduct experiments on the class topic. Students mostly aim for entrance to natural science/engineering and medical/dentistry/oriental medicine programs in domestic colleges. The curriculum follows the standard Korean education system.

Each class comprises approximately 35 students. All students in International Track and Humanities Track are required to intensively learn at least one foreign language in addition to English for three years in school: Chinese, Japanese, French, Spanish, and German language courses are offered. Students in Humanities Track and Natural Science Track prepare for the College Scholastic Ability Test for admissions to domestic colleges in Korea.

== International Track ==
The entire curriculum of International Track follows US education system, students preparing mostly for admissions to colleges outside Korea. Students in this division are given more chances to select their courses, and the class size for each course varies from fifteen to a hundred. Courses include Pre-calculus, AP Calculus, AP Biology, AP Chemistry, AP Economics, English Literature, AP World History, and Foreign Language, and all except for Korean Language and Korean History are to be taught in English.

All instructors in charge of AP courses hold AP certificates. After students finish AP courses, they are suggested to take AP tests administered on-campus. Many students also prepare for AP tests not included in the AP courses offered. AP Calculus BC, AP Chemistry, AP Macroeconomics, AP Microeconomics, and AP World History are among the most popular AP tests taken. Students also take SAT and/or ACT on-campus, and the school supports them by offering preparatory Elective Track courses.

Most students in this division apply to colleges in US, while some graduates have attended colleges in other countries as well; colleges in UK and Hong Kong are popular choices. Many are also accepted to domestic colleges in Korea, including Seoul National University, Yonsei University, and Korea University through rolling admission. Most admission results are in from October of the senior year to April after graduation in February.

== Admissions ==
The school receives applications from all over Korea. There was an exception in 2009, when only students who resided in Gyeonggi Province and Gwangju-si were able to apply due to the governmental sanction on Foreign Language High Schools. The admission process includes a comprehensive assessment on the applicants' middle school transcript, essays, recommendation letters, and interviews. Admissions rate to Hankuk Academy of Foreign Studies was 9.4% (9.6:1) in 2004 and 8.1% (11.4:1) in 2005.

The admission tests changed from time to time; exams in the field of Korean, English, and Mathematics were mandatory (except for candidates who were specialized in English) until the class of 2011. The admission process for the class of 2013 assessed middle school GPAs, interviews, debates, and scores for the English listening comprehension test, being the most complicated one throughout the school history. Conversion of the system from Foreign Language High School to Independent Private School since the class of 2014 resulted in totally different admission processes, with candidates selected based on middle school GPAs, essays, and comprehensive interviews.

== Policies ==
Students in International Track take most of their courses in English and are required to follow English-Based Campus (EBC) policy. Classes for the Humanities Track and Natural Science Track are mostly taught in Korean, and students in these divisions are supposed to practice the EBC policy during recess and lunch. The exceptions are classes in Korean Literature, Korean History and Ethics.

The Global Leader Monitor (GLM) team members are elected at the start of semester by their fellow students to regulate the school policies. They participate in GLM conferences, working as the member of Class Representative Council along with class presidents and vice-presidents, taking active part in forming the policies of the school.

== Facilities ==
Hankuk Academy of Foreign Studies is noted for its unique two person per room dormitory, which is a very rare case for Korean boarding schools. All students are required to live in the school dormitory for the entire three years, and are allowed to leave on weekends only. Each month, there is a mandatory kickoff at the last weekend of the month when the dormitory closes down and all students must go home. The school supplies buses to take the students back and forth to the nearby/public transportation-friendly regional spots. A student may choose to remain in the dormitory during breaks as well. Dormitory facilities include a small store, two laundry rooms (one for each gender), several study rooms, a temporary mail room, and a small gym. There are two dormitory buildings, usually one for each gender but subject to changes depending on the gender ratio. Each time an entire floor or wing is delegated for the use of a specific gender, and students are not allowed to enter the wings used by the other gender.

The school provides all three meals with an additional snack at night. Seniors are expected to pick up their night snack during dinner so that they would not need to disrupt their studies to pick up the snack. A common yearly conflict arises when students intentionally, and without good reason ignore the lunch time designated for each grade (seniors first, then juniors, then the freshmen) in order to cut the waiting time. There is also a small store in the basement of the dormitory open for students which sells snacks, beverages, ice creams, and basic school supplies. In 2012, the store was converted into a convenience store.

The school is also famous for its uniform, which was designed by Andre Kim for free. There are four designs, two for winter and two for summer. A coat, a pair of PE uniforms, and a ribbon or a necktie is included in the uniform set. Students can buy additional clothing items at the dormitory. After dinner, students are allowed to change into comfortable clothes, which includes PE uniforms, school hoods, club hoods, class hoods, and division hoods. In case of club hoods, class hoods, and division hoods, students design and order the hoods themselves as needs arise. All hoods must be confirmed through the school and have the HAFS logo printed on the shoulder to mark that it met the requirements.

== Dormitory Rules ==
The dormitories are gender-segregated, and students are not allowed to enter the residential wings and the laundry room used by the other gender. Students are not allowed to enter the dormitories during school hours except when they have a 'pass' signed by a teacher or an administrator. Students are allowed access to their rooms during dinner and after the studying time. Students can get a 'pass' from the teachers to let themselves stay in the dormitory after dinner. There are strict restrictions on electrical appliances in the dorm rooms. Students are also not allowed to bring in any food that can rot.

There is a curfew at midnight. All lights must be off, and students must go to sleep around 1. During exam periods, and for the seniors, the rules are relaxed. Residential Advisors take turns monitoring the hallways at night.

To go off-campus on weekends, students must register for when they would go out and come back in prior to the weekend in question or have their parents confront the RAs for the pass. Parents are allowed to pick up their children on-campus.

Points are given out to students for misbehavior, such as being late for school or breaking the curfew rule. Students with a certain number of points or above will have their parents notified by the RAs. There are opportunities for counterpoints, usually in the form of helping out an RA. All points are reset at the end of each month.

== School Clubs ==
Hankuk Academy of Foreign Studies is also known for is diversity and amount of their school clubs. There are currently 260 clubs in school, covering various fields of studies and other activities.
