= PLAN (test) =

Standardized test

PLAN test booklets.

The PLAN assessment was a preliminary ACT test from ACT, Inc. that was generally administered in the sophomore year. The PLAN test was scored between 1 and 32 and was determined by a composite scoring system much like that of the ACT, based on the scores received on each of the categories of the test.

== Components ==
The test consisted of four separate parts: an English (grammar) section, a Math section, a Reading section, and a Science section. Each portion of the test had a different number of questions and a different amount of time allotted.

Subject	Number of Questions	Time Allowed
English	30—Usage/Mechanics 20—Rhetorical Skills	30
Math	22—Pre-algebra/Algebra 18—Geometry	40
Reading	25	20
Science	30	25
