= ACT (for-profit organization) =

Administrator of the ACT tests

ACT, Inc.
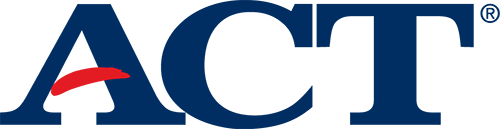
- Type: Private
- Industry: Standardized testing
- Founded: 1959; 67 years ago
- Founders: Everett Franklin Lindquist; Ted McCarrel
- Headquarters: Iowa City, Iowa, United States
- Key people: Steve Tapp (CEO)
- Products: ACT Standardized Testing
- Website: www.act.org

ACT, Inc. is an American for-profit company primarily known for the ACT, a standardized test designed to assess high school students' academic achievement and college readiness. It was announced in April 2024 that the company, previously a 501(c)(3) nonprofit organization (NTEE classification B90, Educational Services, per the IRS), had been purchased by the private equity firm Nexus Capital, raising concerns about transparency and accountability. The company was subsequently acquired by the nonprofit Educational Testing Service in June 2026.

For the U.S. high school graduating class of 2019, 52 percent of graduates had taken the ACT test; the more than 1.78 million students included virtually all high school graduates in 17 states. In addition to the ACT test, ACT programs include ACT Academy, ACT Aspire, ACT CollegeReady, ACT Online Prep, Mawi Learning, ScootPad, PreACT and PreACT 8/9, ACT Tessera, ACT WorkKeys, ACT Work Ready Communities, and the National Career Readiness Certificate.

Founded in Iowa City, Iowa, in 1959, the organization has more than 1,000 employees. Its current CEO is Steve Tapp, who assumed leadership of ACT in 2025. Previous CEOs include Janet Godwin (2020–2025), Marten Roorda (2015–2020), Jon Whitmore (2010–2015), Richard L. Ferguson, (1988–2010), and Oluf Davidsen (1974–1988).

== History ==
The ACT was co-founded by University of Iowa professor Everett Franklin Lindquist in 1959. Lindquist earned his Ph.D. from the University of Iowa in 1927, and then immediately joined its College of Education faculty. In 1929, Lindquist constructed the tests used for the Iowa Academic Meet, a contest to identify Iowa's top high school scholars. In 1935, Lindquist and his colleagues developed the Iowa Tests of Basic Skills (ITBS). In 1942, he introduced the Iowa Tests of Educational Development (ITED) for students in grades 9–12. Lindquist also used the ITED tests to help develop the Armed Forces Tests of General Educational Development, better known as the GED.

In 1958 at a conference sponsored by the Educational Testing Service (ETS), Lindquist presented The Nature of the Problem of Improving Scholarship and College Entrance Examinations. Lindquist argued entrance examinations should evaluate students' readiness to perform college-level work, and should, therefore, be tests of achievement and not of innate intelligence or aptitude, a clear challenge to the test then known as the Scholastic Aptitude Test (now called the SAT).

Lindquist and Ted McCarrel, the University of Iowa registrar, led a team that developed and then delivered the first-ever ACT test to 75,406 students on November 7, 1959.

ACT endorses the Code of Fair Testing Practices in Education and the Code of Professional Responsibilities in Educational Measurement. ACT has policy platforms providing recommendations in three areas: K-12 education, post-secondary education, and workforce development. ACT also publicly publishes its Privacy Policy, which describes protections for the privacy of its customers' personal information.

In April 2024, ACT was purchased by the private equity firm Nexus Capital Management.

=== Major events ===
- On November 7, 1959, the first-ever ACT test was delivered to 75,406 students.
- In 1964, the ACT introduced the ACT Student Profile, which collects information about students' interests, plans, and accomplishments.
- In 1972, ACT offered its first professional services examination (Ophthalmic Knowledge Assessment Program, or OKAP).
- In 1973, the ACT Interest Inventory, a tool for education and career exploration, was incorporated into the ACT test.
- In 1983, ACT introduced ASSET, a program for placing students in postsecondary courses, which later became known as Compass.
- In 1992, the launch of ACT WorkKeys assessments provided applicants, employees, and employers a means for assessing work readiness.
- In 1996, ACT changed its name from "American College Testing" to ACT, Inc.
- In 2005, the writing test was introduced as an optional element of the ACT test.
- In 2006, ACT created the National Career Readiness Certificate, a credentialing tool to confirm foundational job skills.
- In 2012, for the first time, more students took the ACT than took that SAT. In 2013, ACT established the ACT Foundation, intended to help working learners.
- In 2014, ACT introduced ACT Aspire, a longitudinal system for connecting student growth from the elementary grades through early high school.
- In 2015, the ACT test began including additional indicators and scores for English Language Arts (ELA); Science, Technology, Engineering, and Math (STEM); Text Complexity; and Career Readiness.
- In 2016, ACT created the ACT Center for Equity in Learning, which focuses on issues affecting underserved students in education and the workforce.
- In 2024, ACT was purchased by Nexus Capital Management
- In 2026, ACT was acquired by Educational Testing Service

== Products and services ==
The ACT test became the leading college readiness assessment in 2012, surpassing the SAT in the number of students taking the exam. For the US high school graduating class of 2019, 52 percent of all graduates took the ACT. The total number of 2019 high school graduates taking the ACT exceeded 1.78 million.

The ACT measures high school students' general educational development and academic readiness to complete first-year college-level work. For the tested students from the high school graduating class of 2019, 37 percent met ACT's College Readiness Benchmarks in at least three of the four subject areas the ACT tests—English, math, reading, and science.

Scores are reported on a 1–36 scale, with a composite score that represents the average scores from each of the four subject area tests. All ACT scores are reported as whole numbers (e.g., a score of 23.5 rounds up to 24). ACT score reports also include a STEM score, an English/Language Arts score, data on text complexity, and a Progress Toward Career Readiness measure. The average composite score earned by 2019 high school graduates taking the ACT was 20.7.

Virtually all four-year colleges and universities in the United States accept the ACT, but institutions place different emphases on standardized tests, relative to other factors including class rank, GPA, and extracurricular activities. Most colleges do not indicate a preference for the ACT or SAT and accept both. Some colleges accept the ACT in place of the SAT subject tests, and some accept the optional ACT writing section in place of an SAT Subject Test.

Most colleges use ACT scores as only one factor in their admission process, as a supplement to the secondary school record and to help admission officers put local data—such as coursework, grades, and class rank—in a national perspective.

Traditionally delivered in a paper format, the ACT was the first national college admissions test to be offered in a digital format in 2014.

Every three to five years ACT conducts its ACT National Curriculum Survey, which collects data about what students should know and be able to do to be ready for college-level coursework in English, math, reading, and science. The results of the survey are used to inform the ACT College and Career Readiness Standards. The standards are empirically derived descriptions of the essential skills and knowledge students need to become ready for college and career.

ACT also publishes the ACT College Readiness Benchmarks. The benchmarks are scores on the ACT subject-area tests that represent the level of achievement required for students to have a 50% chance of obtaining a B or higher or about a 75% chance of obtaining a C or higher in corresponding credit-bearing first-year college courses. These college courses include English composition, college algebra, introductory social science courses, and biology.

In addition to its use in college admissions, multiple states and thousands of individual school districts use the ACT to assess the performance of schools, requiring all high school students to take the ACT, regardless of whether they are college bound. The states that tested virtually all (95% or more) students in their 2019 graduating classes were Alabama, Arkansas, Kentucky, Louisiana, Minnesota, Mississippi, Montana, Nebraska, Nevada, North Carolina, North Dakota, Ohio, Oklahoma, Tennessee, Utah, Wisconsin and Wyoming.

=== Exam fees and fee waivers ===
The ACT (no writing) test costs $55.00 for the 2020–2021 testing year. The ACT with writing costs $70.00. Additional fees are charged for services including late registrations, test date changes, test center changes, and standby testing.

Fee waivers are available to students currently enrolled in high school in the 11th or 12th grade; who are either a United States citizen or testing in the US, US territories, or Puerto Rico; and meet one or more indicators of economic need listed on the ACT Fee Waiver form. During the 2018–2019 academic year, 487,749 students were awarded fee waivers to test at no cost.

=== Other ACT programs ===
- ACT Academy is a free online learning tool and test practice program designed to help students prepare for the ACT test.
- ACT Aspire measures readiness in English, math, reading, science, and writing from the elementary grades through early high school (grades 3–10). Performance on ACT Aspire predicts performance for early high school students on the ACT. Tests are available in paper and online formats.
- ACT CollegeReady is a tool that identifies knowledge and skill gaps in math and English and creates a personalized learning path. It is administered at the high school and pre-college levels.
- ACT | Mawi Learning is a CASEL-aligned and research-based comprehensive SEL solution that includes professional development and student curriculum.
- The National Research Center for College and University Admissions (NRCCUA), a membership organization that links colleges and universities to the nation's largest college and career planning program for students seeking post-secondary guidance.
- ACT Online Prep provides learning content to help students prepare to take the ACT. The program includes lessons covering all four ACT subject tests (English, math, reading, and science), and two prompts for the optional writing test. Students can also take a full-length practice test, which will provide a predicted ACT score.
- PreACT and PreACT 8/9 are assessments designed to help 10th grade students practice for the ACT test. The PreACT program simulates the ACT testing experience within a shorter test window on all four ACT test subjects and provides scores on the ACT 1–36 scale.
- ScootPad is a personalized, adaptive learning platform to accelerate classroom and at-home learning.
- ACT Tessera is a comprehensive next-generation assessment system designed to measure social and emotional learning (SEL) skills. It provides assessments to help K-12 educators measure and evaluate 6-12th grade students' SEL skills, determine their strengths and areas for improvement, and identify interventions to help them succeed
- ACT WorkKeys is a skills assessment system that helps employers select, hire, train, develop, and retain their workforce. Its assessments measure foundational and soft skills deemed essential to workplace success. Successful completion of WorkKeys assessments in Applied Mathematics, Locating Information, and Reading for Information can lead to earning the National Career Readiness Certificate (NCRC).
- The National Career Readiness Certificate (NCRC) is a WorkKeys-based portable credential. Issued at four levels (platinum, gold, silver, bronze), the NCRC certifies that its holder has essential work skills needed for success in jobs across industries and occupations. The NCRC has been earned by more than 3 million people across the United States.
- The ACT Work Ready Communities program has been adopted by states, counties, and economic development agencies across the United States as a means of providing employers evidence of a skilled workforce
- Global Assessment Certificate is a university preparation and foundation studies program that provides students from mostly non-English-speaking backgrounds with academic knowledge and skills to prepare them for western-style postsecondary study. It is owned and developed by ACT Education Solutions, Ltd. (AES), an international subsidiary of ACT, Inc.

== Research ==
Each year ACT publishes its Condition of College and Career Readiness report, which reports on the progress of US high school graduates relative to college readiness. In addition to the national report, ACT releases focused reports with organizations such as Excelencia in Education, the United Negro College Fund, the National Indian Education Association, and the Asian and Pacific Islander Scholarship Fund to report on academic achievement within those demographic groups.

== Policy, advocacy, and government relations ==
ACT has articulated policy recommendations in the form of policy platforms in three areas: K–12 education, post-secondary education, and workforce development. In addition to the platform-level policy papers, ACT publishes more targeted policy publications.

In June 2020, amidst the COVID-19 pandemic, SAT and ACT tests have been waived and, according to The Washington Post, "States are learning they can live without them, having been given permission by the Department of Education to not give them this past spring." Many universities and colleges set aside the requirement for an SAT or ACT score for school year 2020–2021 and some even until school year 2022.
