= ACT (test) =

American standardized test used for college admissions

- Type: Paper-based and computer-based standardized test
- Administrator: ACT, Inc.
- Skills tested: English, math, reading, science (optional), writing (optional).
- Purpose: Undergraduate admissions (mostly in the US and Canadian universities or colleges).
- Year started: 1959; 67 years ago
- Duration: English: 35 minutes, Math: 50 minutes, Reading: 40 minutes, Optional science test: 40 minutes, Optional writing test: 40 minutes. Total: 2 hours and 5 minutes (excluding optional sections and breaks).
- Score range: Composite score: 1 to 36, Subscore (for each of the four subject areas): 1 to 36. (All in 1-point increments.); Optional Writing Score: 2 to 12. (Sum of two graders’ scoring from 1-6)
- Offered: US and Canada: 7 times a year. Other countries: 5 times a year.
- Regions: Worldwide
- Languages: English
- Annual number of test takers: ▲ Over 1.38 million high school graduates in the class of 2025
- Prerequisites: No official prerequisite. Intended for high school students. Fluency in English assumed.
- Fee: Without writing or science: US$65.00 as of 2025. Science add-on: US$4.00 as of 2025. Writing add-on: US$25.00 as of 2025. Outside US: $125.50 surcharge and $6.00 surcharge for science add-on as of 2025 in addition to the above amounts. (Fee waivers are available for 11th or 12th grade students who are US citizens or testing in the US or US territories, and have demonstrated financial need.)
- Used by: Colleges or universities offering undergraduate programs (mostly in the US and Canada).
- Website: www.act.org

ACT (/ˈeɪ.ˌsiː.ˌtiː/) is a standardized test used for college admissions in the United States. It is administered by ACT, Inc., a for-profit organization of the same name. The ACT test covers three academic skill areas: English, mathematics, and reading. It also offers optional scientific reasoning and direct writing tests. It is accepted by many four-year colleges and universities in the United States as well as more than 225 universities outside of the U.S.

The multiple-choice test sections of the ACT (all except the optional writing test) are individually scored on a scale of 1–36. In addition, a composite score consisting of the rounded whole number average of the scores for English, reading, and math is provided.

The ACT was first introduced in November 1959 by University of Iowa professor Everett Franklin Lindquist as a competitor to the SAT. The ACT originally consisted of four tests: English, Mathematics, Social Studies, and Natural Sciences. In 1989, however, the Social Studies test was changed into a Reading section (which included a social sciences subsection), and the Natural Sciences test was renamed the Science Reasoning test, with more emphasis on problem-solving skills as opposed to memorizing scientific facts. In February 2005, an optional Writing Test was added to the ACT. By late 2017, computer-based ACT tests were available for school-day testing in limited school districts of the US, with greater availability in late 2018. In July 2024, the ACT announced that the test duration was shortened; the science section, like the writing one, would become optional; and online testing would be rolled out nationally in spring 2025 and for school-day testing in spring 2026.

Historical Number of SAT and ACT Test Takers

The ACT has seen a gradual increase in the number of test takers since its inception, and in 2012 the ACT surpassed the SAT for the first time in total test takers; that year, 1,666,017 students took the ACT and 1,664,479 students took the SAT.

On June 30th, 2026, ETS, the largest educational testing and assessment nonprofit, announced the acquisition of ACT.

== Function ==
ACT, Inc., said that the ACT assessment measures high school students' general educational development and their capability to complete college-level work with the multiple choice tests covering four skill areas: English, mathematics, reading, and (optionally) science. The optional Writing Test measures skill in planning and writing a short essay. Specifically, ACT states that its scores provide an indicator of "college readiness", and that scores in each of the subtests correspond to skills in entry-level college courses in English, algebra, social science, humanities, and biology. According to a research study conducted by ACT, Inc. in 2003, there was a relationship between a student's ACT composite score and the probability of that student earning a college degree.

To develop the test, ACT incorporates the objectives for instruction from middle and high schools throughout the United States, reviews approved textbooks for subjects taught in Grades 7–12, and surveys educators on which knowledge skills are relevant to success in postsecondary education. ACT publishes a technical manual that summarizes studies conducted on its validity in predicting freshman GPA, equating different high school GPAs, and measuring educational achievement.

Colleges use the ACT and the SAT because there are substantial differences in funding, curricula, grading, and difficulty among U.S. secondary schools due to American federalism, local control, the prevalence of private, distance, homeschooled students, and lack of a rigorous college entrance examination system similar those used in some other countries. ACT scores are used to supplement the secondary school record and help admission officers put local data—such as coursework, grades, and class rank—in a national perspective.

The majority of colleges do not indicate a preference for the SAT or ACT exams and accept both, being treated equally by most admissions officers. According to "Uni in the USA", colleges that also require students to take the SAT Subject Tests do so regardless of whether the candidate took the SAT or ACT; however, some colleges accept the ACT in place of the SAT subject tests and some accept the optional ACT Writing section in place of an SAT Subject Test.

Most colleges use ACT scores as only one factor in the admission process. A sampling of ACT admissions scores shows that the 75th percentile composite score was 24.1 at public four-year institutions and 25.3 at private four-year institutions.

In addition, some states and individual school districts have used the ACT to assess student learning and/or the performance of schools, requiring all high school students to take the ACT, regardless of whether they are college bound. Colorado and Illinois were the first to incorporate the ACT as part of their mandatory testing program in 2001. Other states followed suit in subsequent years. During the 2018–2019 school year, 13 states will administer the ACT test to all public school 11th graders, and another six states will fund ACT test administration as an option or choice for districts.

While the exact manner in which ACT scores will help to determine admission of a student at American institutions of higher learning is generally a matter decided by the individual institution, some foreign countries have made ACT (and SAT) scores a legal criterion in deciding whether holders of American high school diplomas will be admitted at their public universities.

This map of the United States shows the states in which more seniors in the class of 2024 took the SAT than the ACT (colored in blue), and the states in which more seniors took the ACT than the SAT (colored in red).

The ACT is more widely used in the Midwestern, Rocky Mountain, and Southern United States, whereas the SAT is more popular on the East and West coasts. Recently, however, the ACT is being used more on the East Coast. Use of the ACT by colleges has risen as a result of various criticisms of the effectiveness and fairness of the SAT.

== Format ==
The required portion of the ACT is divided into three multiple-choice subject tests: English, mathematics, and reading. Subject test scores, including the optional science section, range from 1 to 36; all scores are integers. The English, mathematics, and reading tests also have subscores ranging from 1 to 18 (the subject score is not the sum of the subscores). In addition, students taking the optional writing test receive a writing score ranging from 2 to 12 (this is a change from the previous 1–36 score range); the optional science and writing scores do not affect the composite score. Prior to September 2015, there was a Combined English/Writing score, which was a 36-point combination of the 36-point English Test score and the 12-point Writing subscore. The ACT has eliminated the Combined English/writing score and has added two new combined scores: ELA (an average of the English, Reading, and Writing scores) and STEM (an average of the Math and Science scores). These changes for the writing, ELA, and STEM scores were effective starting with the September 2015 test. In spring of 2026, a new Enhanced ACT format was introduced wherein the number of questions and time were decreased for all sections but writing, and the science section was made optional; the Enhanced ACT also introduced field-test questions that do not effect the score.

Each question answered correctly is worth one raw point, and there is no penalty for marking incorrect answers on the multiple-choice parts of the test; a student can answer all questions without a decrease in their score due to incorrect answers. This is parallel to several AP Tests eliminating the penalties for incorrect answers. To improve the result, students can retake the test: 55% of students who retake the ACT improve their scores, 22% score the same, and 23% see their scores decrease.

=== English ===
The first section is the 35-minute English test covering usage/mechanics, sentence structure, and rhetorical skills. The 50-question test consists of five passages with various sections underlined on one side of the page and options to correct the underlined portions on the other side of the page. Specifically, questions focus on usage and mechanics – issues such as commas, apostrophes, (misplaced/dangling) modifiers, colons, and fragments and run-ons – as well as on rhetorical skills – style (clarity and brevity), strategy, transitions, and organization (sentences in a paragraph and paragraphs in a passage) – and sentence structure – constructing sentences in a stylistically and grammatically correct manner. The English test includes ten field-test questions that do not effect scoring. Prior to the spring of 2026, the English section contained 75 questions across 45 minutes.

=== Math ===
The second section is a 45-minute, 50-question math test with the usual distribution of questions being approximately 33 "Preparing for Higher Math" questions, 4-5 number & quantity questions, 7-8 algebra questions, 7-8 function questions, 7‍-8 geometry questions, 5-6 statistics and probability questions, 8 "Integrating Essential Skills" questions, and at least 8 modeling questions. Additionally, it contains 4 field-test questions. Prior to spring of 2026, the test contained 60 questions over 60 minutes. However, the distribution of question topics varies from test to test. The difficulty of questions usually increases as a test taker moves on to higher question numbers.

Calculators are permitted in this section only. Similarly to the SAT, computer algebra systems (such as the TI-89) are not allowed; however, the ACT permits calculators with paper tapes, that make noise (but must be disabled), or that have power cords with certain "modifications" (i.e., disabling the mentioned features), which the SAT does not allow. Standard graphing calculators, such as the TI-83 and TI-84, are allowed. Within the TI-Nspire family, the standard and CX versions are allowed while the CX CAS is not.

As of April 2025 for online tests, and September 2025 for paper-and-pencil tests, each math question has four answer choices instead of five.

=== Reading ===
The reading section is a 40-minute, 36-question containing 9 field-test questions and four sections, three of which contain one long prose passage and one which contains two shorter prose passages. The passages are representative of the levels and kinds of text commonly encountered in first-year college curriculum. This reading test assesses skills in three general categories: key ideas and details, craft and structure, and integration of knowledge and ideas. Test questions will usually ask students to derive meaning from texts referring to what is explicitly stated or by reasoning to determine implicit meanings. Specifically, questions will ask students to use referring and reasoning skills to determine main ideas; locate and interpret significant details; understand sequences of events; make comparisons; comprehend cause-effect relationships; determine the meaning of context-dependent words, phrases, and statements; draw generalizations; and analyze the author's or narrator's voice and method. Prior to spring of 2026, the test was 40 minutes and 35 questions.

=== Science ===
The optional science section is a 35-minute, 40-question test. There are seven passages each followed by five to seven questions. The passages have three different formats: Data Representation, Research Summary, and Conflicting Viewpoints. While the format used to be very predictable (i.e. there were always three Data Representation passages with 5 questions following each, 3 Research Summary passages with six questions each, and one Conflicting Viewpoints passage with 7 questions), when the number of passages was reduced from 7 to 6, more variability in the number of each passage type started to appear. But so far, there is still always only one Conflicting Viewpoints passage. These changes are very recent, and the only reference to them so far is in the recently released practice test on the ACT website.

The science section was mandatory until 2024, when it was made optional with the goal of giving students additional flexibility when taking the ACT exam.

=== Writing ===
The optional writing section, which is always administered at the end of the test, is 40 minutes (increasing from the original 30-minute time limit on the September 2015 test). While no particular essay structure is required, the essays must be in response to a given prompt; the prompts are about broad social issues (changing from the old prompts which were directly applicable to teenagers), and students must analyze three different perspectives given and show how their opinion relates to these perspectives. The essay does not affect the composite score or the English section score; it is only given as a separate writing score and is included in the ELA score. Two trained readers assign each essay subscores between 1 and 6 in four different categories: Ideas and Analysis, Development and Support, Organization, Language Use and Conventions. Scores of 0 are reserved for essays that are blank, off-topic, non-English, not written with a no. 2 pencil, or considered illegible after several attempts at reading. The subscores from the two different readers are summed to produce final domain scores from 2 to 12 (or 0) in each of the four categories. If the two readers' subscores differ by more than one point, then a senior third reader makes the final decision on the score. The four domain scores are combined through a process that has not been described to create a writing section score between 1 and 36. Note that the domain scores are not added to create the writing section score.

Although the writing section is optional, many colleges require an essay score and will factor it into the admissions decision (but fewer than half of all colleges have this requirement).

=== Averages ===
Historical average ACT scores of college-bound seniors

This map shows the mean ACT composite scores of students within the United States in 2014.

For the "enhanced" version of the ACT introduced in 1989, the mean score of each of the four tests, as well as the mean composite score, was scaled to be 18, with an intended standard error of measurement of 2 for the four test scores and 1 for the composite score. These statistics vary from year to year for current populations of ACT takers.

The chart below summarizes each section and the average test score based on graduating high school seniors in 2025.

Section	Number of questions	Time (minutes)	Score Range	Average score (2025)	College Readiness Benchmark	Content
English	75	45	1–36	18.4	18	Usage/mechanics and rhetorical skills
Mathematics	60	60	1–36	18.9	22	Pre-algebra, elementary algebra, intermediate algebra, coordinate geometry, geometry, elementary trigonometry, reasoning, and problem-solving
Reading	40	35	1–36	20.0	22	Reading comprehension
Optional Science	40	35	1–36	19.6	23	Interpretation, analysis, evaluation, reasoning, and problem-solving
Optional Writing Test (not included in composite score)	1 essay prompt	40	1–12	6.1		Writing skills
Composite			1–36	19.4		Average (mean) of all section scores except Writing

=== Highest score ===
Percent of high school seniors scoring a composite of 36 on their ACT test from 1995 to 2025

The table below summarizes how many students achieved a composite score of 36 on the ACT between the years of 1990 and 2025.

Year	Number of students who achieved a composite score of 36	Number of students overall	% of students who achieved a 36
2025	2,958	1,380,130	0.2143
2024	3,041	1,374,791	0.2212
2023	2,542	1,386,335	0.1834
2022	3,376	1,349,644	0.2501
2021	4,055	1,295,349	0.3130
2020	5,579	1,670,497	0.3340
2019	4,879	1,782,820	0.2737
2018	3,741	1,914,817	0.1954
2017	2,760	2,030,038	0.1359
2016	2,235	2,090,342	0.1069
2015	1,598	1,924,436	0.0830
2014	1,407	1,845,787	0.07622
2013	1,162	1,799,243	0.06458
2012	781	1,666,017	0.04687
2011	704	1,623,112	0.04337
2010	588	1,568,835	0.03748
2009	638	1,480,469	0.04309
2008	428	1,421,941	0.03010
2007	314	1,300,599	0.02414
2006	216	1,206,455	0.01790
2005	193	1,186,251	0.01627
2004	224	1,171,460	0.01912
2003	195	1,175,059	0.01659
2002	134	1,116,082	0.01201
2001	89	1,069,772	0.00832
2000	131	1,065,138	0.01230
1999	85	1,019,053	0.00834
1998	71	995,039	0.00714
1997	74	959,301	0.00771
1996	63	924,663	0.00681
1995	82	945,369	0.00867
1994	59	891,714	0.00662
1993	65	875,603	0.00742
1992	51	832,217	0.00613
1991	31	796,983	0.00389
1990	19	817,096	0.00233

=== College admissions ===
The ACT Assessment Student Report, at ACT.org, provides the typical ACT Composite averages for college and universities admission policies. They caution that "because admission policies vary across colleges, the score ranges should be considered rough guidelines." Following is a list of the average composite scores that typically are accepted at colleges or universities.

- Ivy Caliber (Schools that as a rule of thumb have below a 1 in 8 acceptance rate): scores 32–36
- Highly selective (majority of accepted freshmen in top 10% of high school graduating class): scores 27–31
- Selective (majority of accepted freshmen in top 25% of high school graduating class): scores 24–26
- Traditional (majority of accepted freshmen in top 50% of high school graduating class): scores 21–23
- Liberal (some freshmen from lower half of high school graduating class): scores 18–20
- Open (all high school graduates accepted, to limit of capacity): scores 17–20 Any score is likely accepted.

== Test availability ==
The ACT is offered seven times a year in the United States and its territories, Puerto Rico, and Canada: in September, October, December, February, April, June, and July. (In New York State, the test is not offered in July.) In other locations, the ACT is offered five times a year: in September, October, December, April, and June. The ACT is offered only on Saturdays except for those with credible religious obligations, who may take the test on another day.

The ACT is designed, administered, and scored so that there is no advantage to testing on one particular date.

For candidates in the United States, the ACT assessment costs $65.00 and there are two optional add-ons, the science section ($4.00) and the writing section ($25.00).

For candidates outside of the United States, the test costs considerably more, at $186.50, with science costing $10.00, although writing retains its price of $25.00.

For the 2025 testing dates, the science section is only optional for the digital test.

Students with verifiable disabilities, including physical and learning disabilities, are eligible to take the test with accommodations. The standard time increase for students requiring additional time due to disabilities is 50%. Originally, the score sheet was labeled that additional time was granted due to a learning disability; however, this was ultimately dropped because it was deemed illegal under the Americans with Disabilities Act and could be perceived as an unfair designator of disability.

Scores are sent to the student, their high school, and up to four colleges of the student's choice (optional).

== Test section durations ==
Time is a major factor to consider in testing.

The ACT is generally regarded as being composed of somewhat easier questions versus the SAT, but the shorter time allotted to complete each section increases difficulty. The ACT allows:

- 45 minutes for a 75-question English section
- 60 minutes for a 60-question Mathematics section
- 35 minutes for a 40-question Reading section
- 35 minutes for a 40-question Science section

Comparatively, the SAT is structured such that the test taker is allowed at least one minute per question, on generally shorter sections (25 or fewer questions). Times may be adjusted as a matter of accommodation for certain disabilities or other impairments.

== National ranks (score cumulative percentages) ==
Score reports provided to students taking the ACT test include the ranks (or cumulative percents) for each score and subscore received by the student. Each rank gives the percentage of recently tested students in the U.S. who scored at or below the given student's score. The following table shows the ACT national ranks as of the 2020-21 school year.

ACT Score	English Rank	Math Rank	Reading Rank	Science Rank	Composite Rank	STEM Rank
36	100	100	100	100	100	100
35	99	99	98	99	99	99
34	96	99	96	98	99	99
33	94	98	94	97	98	98
32	92	97	91	96	96	97
31	91	96	89	95	95	96
30	89	94	86	93	93	94
29	88	93	84	92	90	92
28	86	91	82	90	88	90
27	84	88	80	88	85	87
26	82	84	77	85	82	84
25	79	79	74	82	78	80
24	75	74	71	77	74	75
23	71	70	66	71	70	70
22	65	65	61	64	64	65
21	60	61	55	58	59	60
20	55	58	50	51	53	54
19	49	54	44	45	47	48
18	45	49	39	39	41	41
17	41	42	34	32	35	33
16	37	33	29	26	28	26
15	32	21	24	19	22	18
14	25	11	19	14	16	11
13	19	4	14	10	10	5
12	15	1	10	7	5	2
11	11	1	5	4	2	1
10	7	1	3	3	1	1
9	3	1	1	1	1	1
8	2	1	1	1	1	1
7	1	1	1	1	1	1
6	1	1	1	1	1	1
5	1	1	1	1	1	1
4	1	1	1	1	1	1
3	1	1	1	1	1	1
2	1	1	1	1	1	1
1	1	1	1	1	1	1

== Concordance of ACT and SAT scores ==
The College Board (the developer of the SAT) and ACT, Inc. compared scores from about 600,000 students who were graduating in 2017 and who took both the SAT (2016 revision) and the ACT in 2016 and 2017. The following table shows, for each ACT composite score in the data set, the corresponding range of SAT total scores for students with the same percentile rank on each test. The most appropriate corresponding SAT score point for the given ACT score is also shown in the table.

ACT Composite Score	SAT Total Score Range	SAT Total Score
36	1570–1600	1590
35	1530–1560	1540
34	1490–1520	1500
33	1450–1480	1460
32	1420–1440	1430
31	1390–1410	1400
30	1360–1380	1370
29	1330–1350	1340
28	1300–1320	1310
27	1260–1290	1280
26	1230–1250	1240
25	1200–1220	1210
24	1160–1190	1180
23	1130–1150	1140
22	1100–1120	1110
21	1060–1090	1080
20	1030–1050	1040
19	990–1020	1010
18	960–980	970
17	920–950	930
16	880–910	890
15	830–870	850
14	780–820	800
13	730–770	760
12	690–720	710
11	650–680	670
10	620–640	630
9	590–610	590

== Score cumulative percentages and comparison with pre-2016 SAT ==
The data in this section pertains to the SAT prior to the 2016 redesign. Comparisons to SAT scores are not valid after the 2017 graduating class.

Sixty percent—about 2.03 million students—of the 2017 high school graduating class took the ACT. For the graduating class of 2017, the average composite score was a 21.0. Of these test-takers, 46% were male and 52% were female, with 2% not reporting a gender. 2,760 students in the graduating class of 2017 received the highest ACT composite score of 36.

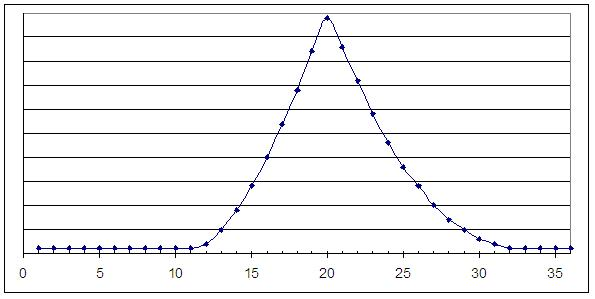
2005 distribution of ACT scores

The following chart shows, for each ACT score from 11 to 36, the corresponding ACT percentile and equivalent total SAT score or score range. (Concordance data for ACT scores less than 11 is not yet available for the current version of the SAT.) Note that ACT percentiles are defined as the percentage of test takers scoring at or below the given score.

SAT combined score (Math + Reading/Writing)	ACT composite score	The percentile of students at or below this score for the ACT (not SAT)
1600	36	100%
1560–1590	35	99.9%
1520–1550	34	99%
1490–1510	33	98%
1450–1480	32	97%
1420–1440	31	96%
1390–1410	30	94%
1350–1380	29	92%
1310–1340	28	89%
1280–1300	27	86%
1240–1270	26	82%
1200–1230	25	78%
1160–1190	24	74%
1130–1150	23	69%
1100–1120	22	63%
1060–1090	21	57%
1020–1050	20	51%
980–1010	19	44%
940–970	18	38%
900–930	17	31%
860–890	16	25%
810–850	15	19%
760–800	14	13%
720–750	13	8%
630–710	12	4%
560–620	11	1%

=== Score vs Percentile for English Section ===
Score	The percentile of students at or below this score
36	100%
35	99%
34	99%
33	97%
32	96%
31	94%
30	93%
29	91%
28	88%
27	85%
26	82%
25	78%
24	73%
23	68%
22	63%
21	57%
20	50%
19	43%
18	38%
17	33%
16	29%
15	24%
14	18%
13	14%
12	11%
11	9%

=== Score vs Percentile for Mathematics Section ===
Score	The percentile of students at or below this score
36	99%
35	99%
34	99%
33	98%
32	97%
31	96%
30	94%
29	93%
28	91%
27	88%
26	84%
25	79%
24	74%
23	67%
22	61%
21	57%
20	52%
19	47%
18	41%
17	34%
16	26%
15	14%
14	6%
13	2%
12	1%
11	1%

=== Score vs Percentile for Reading Section ===
Score	The percentile of students at or below this score
36	99%
35	99%
34	99%
33	97%
32	95%
31	93%
30	91%
29	87%
28	85%
27	82%
26	78%
25	75%
24	71%
23	66%
22	60%
21	54%
20	48%
19	42%
18	39%
17	30%
16	25%
15	19%
14	15%
13	10%
12	6%
11	3%

=== Score vs Percentile for Science Section ===
Score	The percentile of students at or below this score
36	99%
35	99%
34	99%
33	99%
32	98%
31	97%
30	96%
29	95%
28	93%
27	91%
26	87%
25	83%
24	77%
23	70%
22	62%
21	56%
20	47%
19	38%
18	34%
17	21%
16	19%
15	15%
14	11%
13	8%
12	5%
11	3%

== See also ==
- ACT (for-profit organization)#Other ACT programs
- College admissions in the United States
- Global Assessment Certificate
- List of admission tests to colleges and universities
- Math–verbal achievement gap
- PLAN (test)
- SAT
- 2019 college admissions bribery scandal
