= Jon Whitmore =

American educator and academic

27th President of San José State University
- In office August 1, 2008 – August 2010
- Preceded by: Don Kassing
- Succeeded by: Don Kassing

14th President of Texas Tech University
- In office August 30, 2003 – 2008
- Preceded by: David J. Schmidly
- Succeeded by: Guy Bailey

Personal details
- Born: Jon Scott Whitmore; March 22, 1945 (age 81) Seattle, Washington, U.S.
- Spouse: Jennifer Whitmore
- Children: 2
- Education: Washington State University (B.A. 1967, M.A. 1968); University of California, Santa Barbara (Ph.D. 1974)
- Profession: Educator
- Salary: $226,877 (as of 2010)

Jon Scott Whitmore (born March 22, 1945) was the chief executive officer of ACT, Inc. (2010–2015), a nonprofit organization headquartered in Iowa City, Iowa, with additional offices across the United States and around the world. ACT is best known for the ACT college readiness assessment, taken by more than half of America’s high school graduating class each year.

Before joining ACT in 2010, Whitmore held leadership positions at San José State University, Texas Tech University, The University of Iowa, The University of Texas at Austin, The State University of New York at Buffalo, and West Virginia University.

== Early life and education ==
Whitmore was born in 1945 in Seattle, Washington, but spent most of his childhood in Stanley, North Dakota. One of two children, Whitmore and his brother, Terry, are both first-generation college graduates. Whitmore’s mother was a primary school teacher. Before starting his undergraduate studies at Washington State University, Whitmore ran a movie house in his hometown.

Whitmore earned his bachelor’s (1967) and master’s (1968) degrees in speech from Washington State University, and a PhD (1974) in theatre history from the University of California, Santa Barbara. As an undergraduate student, Whitmore was president of the Washington State University Chapter of the National Collegiate Players and a recipient of National Collegiate Players Scholastic Achievement Award. As a master’s student at Washington State University, Whitmore wrote his thesis on the use of laughter in Tennessee Williams’ plays and directed numerous productions, including Miss Julie by August Strindberg and Servant of Two Masters by Carlo Goldoni. As a doctoral student at the University of California, Santa Barbara, Whitmore wrote his dissertation on William Saroyan and directed productions including The Effect of Gamma Rays on Man-in-the-Moon Marigolds by Paul Zindel and Epiphany by Lewis John Carlino.

== University career ==
After finishing his undergraduate studies, Whitmore taught for three years at Highline Community College in Des Moines, Washington. After earning his doctorate, Whitmore began teaching at West Virginia University, rising from assistant professor to professor of theatre from 1974 to 1985 and serving as interim dean and director of the College of Creative Arts from 1984 to 1985. Whitmore also served as the chair of the Division of Theatre from 1979 to 1985. Soon after, he moved to The State University of New York at Buffalo to be dean of the Faculty of Arts and Letters and professor of theatre from 1985 to 1990. Whitmore joined The University of Texas at Austin in 1990 until 1996, where he served as dean of the College of Fine Arts and professor of theatre. In 1996, he moved to Iowa City, Iowa, to become provost of The University of Iowa and professor of theatre until 2003. In 2003, Whitmore was selected to be president of Texas Tech University, serving five years, where he also held a professorship in theatre. In 2008, Whitmore was named president of San José State University. Two years later, Whitmore became chief executive officer of ACT, returning to Iowa City. Across its programs, ACT provides more than 100 assessment, research, information, and program management services to enhance education and workforce development.

== Personal life ==
Whitmore met his wife, Jennifer, at West Virginia University. They have been married for 28 years and have two children, Ian and Amy. Both of the Whitmore children are graduates of The University of Iowa.

== Books authored and edited ==
- William Saroyan: A Research and Production Sourcebook (Greenwood Press, 1994). ISBN 978-0-313-29250-7
- Directing Postmodern Theater: Shaping Signification in Performance (University of Michigan Press, 1994). ISBN 978-0-472-06557-8
- Editor, Directory of Theatre Programs, 1991 (Association for Communication, 1991). ISBN 978-0-929506-02-9
- Co-editor, A Handbook for Theatre Department Chairs (1988; Association for Communication, 2001). ISBN 978-0-929506-00-5
