= Guy Bailey =

American sociolinguist

Guy H. Bailey

1st President of the University of Texas Rio Grande Valley
- Incumbent
- Assumed office April 28, 2014
- Preceded by: Office established

27th President of the University of Alabama
- In office August 15, 2012 – October 31, 2012
- Preceded by: Robert Witt
- Succeeded by: Judy Bonner

15th President of Texas Tech University
- In office August 1, 2008 – August 15, 2012
- Preceded by: Jon Whitmore
- Succeeded by: Duane Nellis

12th Chancellor of the University of Missouri-Kansas City
- In office January 1, 2006 – August 1, 2008
- Preceded by: Stephen Lehmkuhle (interim)
- Succeeded by: Leo Morton

Personal details
- Born: Guy Hubert Bailey; August 9, 1950 (age 75)
- Education: University of Alabama (BA, MA); University of Tennessee, Knoxville (PhD)

Guy Hubert Bailey (born August 9, 1950) is an American sociolinguist and the 1st president of the University of Texas–Rio Grande Valley. He was the president of the University of Alabama, his baccalaureate alma mater. He was previously the president of Texas Tech University and held earlier positions at Emory University, Texas A&M University, and Oklahoma State University, prior to serving as dean of liberal arts at University of Nevada, Las Vegas. From there he became provost of the University of Texas at San Antonio. Before assuming the role at Texas Tech, he was the chancellor of the University of Missouri–Kansas City.

== Education ==
Bailey holds a bachelor's and master's degrees in English from the University of Alabama and a doctorate in English linguistics from the University of Tennessee. He did postdoctoral studies at Emory University and Stanford University. He is the author of over 100 books and articles.

== Career ==
=== University of Texas at San Antonio ===
Before accepting the position of chancellor at the University of Missouri–Kansas City, Bailey served as the provost at the University of Texas at San Antonio.

=== University of Missouri–Kansas City ===
Bailey's term as chancellor of the University of Missouri–Kansas City began on January 1, 2006.

=== Texas Tech University ===
On July 2, 2008, Bailey was selected to succeed Jon Whitmore as the president of Texas Tech University. He assumed the position on August 1, 2008. Bailey's wife, Jan Tillery, is a Texas Tech graduate who was raised in the Lubbock area.

=== University of Alabama ===
On July 11, 2012, Bailey was named the incoming president of the University of Alabama. His appointment began in early September 2012. On October 31, 2012, Bailey announced he was stepping down as president of the University, to focus on his wife's healthcare needs.

=== University of Texas–Rio Grande Valley ===
In 2014, Bailey was revealed to be a shortlisted candidate for the position of inaugural president of The University of Texas–Rio Grande Valley. He was announced as the sole finalist, and de facto incoming president, on 28 April 2014.

== Work in linguistics ==
Bailey is known nationally for his work in linguistics and has often researched jointly with his wife. One of his most notable projects is a long-term sociolinguistic study, in collaboration with Patricia Cukor-Avila, in the Brazos Valley of Texas.

== Family ==
Bailey has two adult children, Jordan and Brooks, from his first marriage. He was married to his second wife Jan Tillery-Bailey until her death on September 1, 2013.
