= André Kim =

South Korean fashion designer (1935–2010)

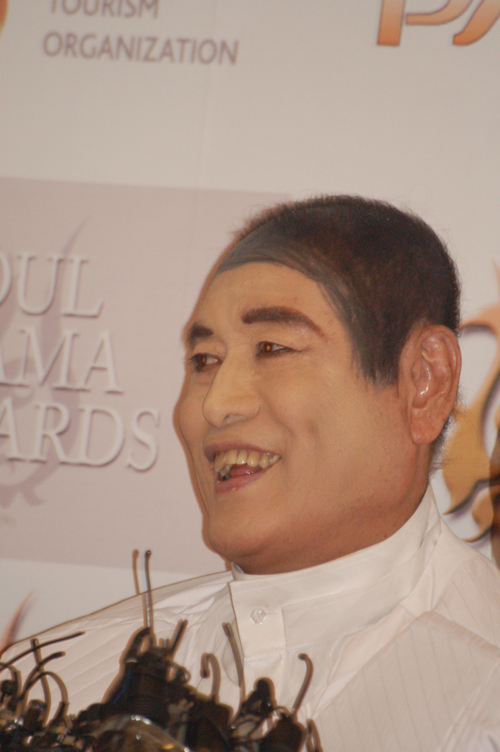
- André Kim at the Seoul Drama Awards 2007
- Born: August 24, 1935; Goyang, Gyeonggi, South Korea
- Died: August 12, 2010 (aged 74); Seoul, South Korea
- Education: Kukje Fashion Design Academy; Hanyeong High School
- Label: Andre Kim
- Awards: Cultural Merit Award (Italy); Presidential Culture & Art Medal; MBC Honorary Award; UNICEF Goodwill Ambassador; Hawaii's Plaque of Appreciation

- André Kim
- Hangul: 김봉남
- Hanja: 金鳳男
- RR: Gim Bongnam
- MR: Kim Pongnam

Kim Bong-nam (Korean: 김봉남; August 24, 1935 – August 12, 2010), known professionally as André Kim (앙드레 김), was a South Korean fashion designer based in Seoul, South Korea. He was known predominantly for his evening and wedding gown collections.

== Biography ==
Andre Kim was born in Goyang, Gyeonggi, Korea, as Kim Bong-nam. The son of rural farmers, Kim attended Hanyeong High School and graduated from the Kukje Fashion Design Institute.

== Fashion career ==
Kim has been in fashion design since 1962. At the age of 27, he opened Salon Andre in Sogong-dong, Central Seoul, becoming Korea's first male fashion designer. In 1966 he became the first South Korean to hold a fashion show in Paris. He would later go on to hold many other fashion shows in New York, Washington DC, Barcelona, Cairo, Sydney, and Beijing.

In 1981, Kim was selected as chief designer for the 1981 Miss Universe beauty pageant. In 1988, he designed the uniforms of the Korean athletes for the 1988 Seoul Olympic Games. Following this, he became a repeated invitee for occasions held by the International Olympic Committee (IOC). In 1997, he was presented with South Korea's Presidential Culture and Art Medal for his contributions to the fashion industry. In 2003, he was awarded Italy's Cultural Merit Award and was elected as UNICEF's Goodwill Ambassador.

In February 2006, Kim hosted two elaborate private shows in Hawaii called, "Fashion Fantasia in Hawaii", at the Turtle Bay Resort during the SBS Open featuring over 140 garments. Governor Linda Lingle and Mayor Mufi Hannemann attended and stayed until the wedding finale, which featured seven unique gowns and a groom. The hairstyles were fashioned by Aveda Salon and Spa and Liberty Salon Hair and were in keeping with Andre Kim's "signature style" of parted hair embellished with rows of braids wound around the models' heads.

In the first show, four LPGA players and Korean actors, Shim Jee-ho (Stained Glass), Kim Min-jung (Fashion 70s), and Hawaiian favorite, Jung Joon-ho (The Twins, Marrying the Mafia) modeled in Kim's show. At the second show, hosted at the Hilton Hawaiian Village Coral Ballroom, Kim's fashions were the centerpiece of a major fundraiser for the University of Hawaii at Manoa of Tropical Agriculture and Human Resources apparel product design and merchandising program. Kim's shows also served as part of the 20th anniversary celebration for local television station KBFD.

In December 2006, Kim showcased his costumes at the Angkor Wat temple, a UNESCO World Heritage Site, in Siem Reap, Cambodia. The show was titled "Fashion Fantasia: Angkor Watt" and was the first fashion show held with the ancient temple as a backdrop. This fashion show was part of the Angkor-Gyeongju World Culture Expo 2006 that kicked off in November 2006 and ran through January 9, 2007. The 50-day event was titled "Ancient Future: The Myths of the Orient" and featured exhibitions on the Khmer civilization and the Silla culture "to provide an insight into the culture of Korea and Cambodia". Kim presented about 180 outfits, including dresses and suits, built around the heritage of Silla-era Gyeongju and the Khmer empire at Angkor Wat. The main models were actress Kim Hee-sun, who starred in the 2005 Hong Kong movie The Myth with Jackie Chan, and actor Kim Rae-won (Love Story in Harvard, Cats on the Roof).

On February 10, 2007, Kim presented his menswear collection and was a celebrity judge for Manhunt International 2007 held at South Korea's Kangwonland International Convention Centre, a newly opened ski resort bidding for the next Winter Olympic Games. In March, Kim appeared in Shanghai, China to hold a fashion show and then arrived in Washington, D.C., on June 19, 2007, to hold a charity fashion show to benefit the UNICEF. On May 7, 2007, Kim held a fashion show at the Big Pallet Convention Center in Koriyama, Japan to mark the year of Korea-Japan friendship. He also designed uniforms for the Hankuk Academy of Foreign Studies in Yongin and took a foray out of clothes into designing washing machines, refrigerators, and air conditioners for Samsung. Kim also has launched lines in cosmetics, golfing goods, sunglasses, and interior design of apartments.

Kim hosted at least two fashion shows during the summer of 2007. On July 12, Kim held a fashion show in Wuxi, China at the invitation of the Wuhsi municipal government and the large shopping mall ITFM (International Textile & Fashion Megamall) to celebrate both the 2008 Beijing Olympics and the 15th anniversary of the diplomatic ties between Korea and China. The show was the tenth Kim has held in China so far since his first in 1993 to mark the first anniversary of diplomatic ties between the two countries. The show was entitled "Four Seasons Fantasy" and showcased some 180 costumes highlighted by several themes such as "White Night," which held Kim's clothes against a snowy backdrop, and the "World's Immortal Masterpieces," which featured medieval paintings on clothes. Several Korean celebrities modeled; singers such as Choi Siwon of Super Junior, Ivy and Son Hoyoung walked down the runway as special models, in addition to all 65 contestants of the 2007 Miss Korea Beauty Pageant. In August, Kim staged a show celebrating the opening of a large art hall at Seoul National University.

In the fall of 2007, to celebrate the coming of the 2008 Beijing Olympic Games, upon invitation from the Chinese government, Kim presented his designs, modeled by Korean actor Kim Rae-won, making this his second appearance on an Andre Kim fashion show, and actress Kim Tae-hee (Love Story in Harvard, Stairway to Heaven), at a fashion show in Qingdao, China in the September On September 15, 2007, a fashion show was held in Sabuk, South Korea. On November 27, Kim held another fashion show featuring Korean actress, Choi Ji-woo of Stairway to Heaven and Aircity fame.

On June 13, 2008, Andre Kim held a fashion show in Kyonggi-do, South Korea. Several Korean celebrities modeled including Lee Hanee, 3rd runner-up in Miss Universe 2007, Tim, a Korean ballad singer, actress Lee Eun-sung (Evasive Inquiry Agency, Que Sera, Sera) and actor Ha Seok-jin (Hello! Miss). Lee and Ha later co-starred in the 2008 Korean drama, I Am Happy.

In March 2010 Andre Kim made one of his last public appearances serving as a judge for the Miss World Organization alongside Julia Morley for the Mister World 2010 Pageant held in Incheon, Korea. The contestants of the Mister World 2010 Pageant were models for an extravagant Andre Kim fashion show.

== Style ==
The designs of André Kim are said to "combine classical designs with futuristic elements", often resulting in distinctive designs with bold, rich colors and motifs of Asiatic patterns, often of large roses, birds, or tree branches. For his fashion shows, Kim favors white-toned settings to bring out the unusual colours of his designs.

His designs are held in high regard by Korean celebrities, and many of these celebrities model in his fashion shows. His wedding dress fashion shows are particularly renowned for showcasing celebrities. Kim's fame also extends beyond Korea's borders – Michael Jackson once asking him to be his personal designer. However, Kim declined, stating his clothes were for everyone.

Kim has said, "Fashion should portray grace, intellect, artistic beauty, and youthful energy. Not too classic. I don't like 'old.' Even though I was born in 1935, I don't feel my age. I feel like a teenager who is 10 or 15 or 20 years old in a fairy tale, a fantasy, young and brilliant."

== Death and legacy ==
He died in Seoul, South Korea, in August 2010 due to pneumonia and colorectal cancer, twelve days before his 75th birthday. His wake service was held at Seoul National University Hospital on 12 August. The Korean press described his death as a loss of a Korean fashion icon.

Upon his death his son, Kim Jung-do continued the Andre Kim brand as CEO, through the Andre Kim Design Atelier located in Sinsa-dong, Gangnam District, managing their various licensed brands.

== In film ==
In 2012, it was announced that a film, in his honor, was being created. Ha Jung-woo was expected to play him in the biopic. No further detail has been disclosed since and, as of March 2013, the film has not yet been released.

== Honors ==
- Chief designer of the 1981 Miss Universe beauty pageant
- Italy's Cultural Merit Award, 1982
- Presidential Culture & Art Medal, 1997
- France's Art and Literature medal, 2000
- MBC Honorary Award, 2000
- UNICEF Goodwill Ambassador, 2003
- Honorable Ambassador at GwanGju, 2004
- Plaque of Appreciation from the Honolulu, Hawaii's Gov. Linda Lingle, 2006
- Official fashion designer of Manhunt International, 2007
- Mentioned in H2O, a manhwa by Hwang Sook Ji

== See also ==
- Fashion in South Korea
