= Achievement gaps in the United States =

Disparities in educational performance

Achievement gaps in the United States are observed, persistent disparities in measures of educational performance among subgroups of U.S. students, especially groups defined by socioeconomic status (SES), race/ethnicity and gender. The achievement gap can be observed through a variety of measures, including standardized test scores, grade point average, dropout rates, college enrollment, and college completion rates. The gap in achievement between lower income students and higher income students exists in all nations and it has been studied extensively in the U.S. and other countries, including the U.K. Various other gaps between groups exist around the globe as well.

Research into the causes of the disparity in academic achievement between students from different socioeconomic and racial backgrounds has been ongoing since the 1966 publication of the Coleman Report (officially titled "Equality of Educational Opportunity"), commissioned by the U.S. Department of Education. The report found that a combination of home, community, and in-school factors affect academic performance and contribute to the achievement gap. According to American educational psychologist David Berliner, home and community environments have a stronger impact on school achievement than in-school factors, in part because students spend more time outside of school than in school. In addition, the out-of-school factors influencing academic performance differ significantly between children living in poverty and children from middle-income households.

The achievement gap, as reported in trend data collected by the National Assessment of Educational Progress (NAEP), has become a focal point of education reform efforts by a number of nonprofit organizations and advocacy groups. Attempts to minimize the achievement gap by improving equality of access to educational opportunities have been numerous but fragmented. These efforts include establishing affirmative action, emphasizing multicultural education, and increasing interventions to improve school testing, teacher quality and accountability.

== Racial achievement gap ==
The education of African Americans and some other minorities lags behind those of other U.S. ethnic groups, such as White Americans and Asian Americans, as reflected by test scores, grades, urban high school graduation rates, rates of disciplinary action, and rates of conferral of undergraduate degrees. Indeed, high school graduation rates and college enrollment rates are comparable to those of white Americans 25 or 30 years ago. It should also be noted that the category of African immigrant population (excluding Haitians and other foreign-born black people born outside of Africa) has the highest educational attainment of any group in the United States, but they represent a small group within the larger African American population.

Asian Americans of Indian, Chinese, Japanese, and Korean descent score the highest on average, with the difference primarily on mathematics subtests, in all scholastic standardized tests such as the SAT, GRE, MCAT, USMLE exams and IQ tests followed by White Americans who score in the intermediate range. Hispanic American and African American scores tend to follow White scores. U.S. students as a whole have in general attained average scores on the International PISA test while other wealthy industrialized developed East Asian countries, such as China, Japan, Singapore and South Korea, achieve the highest top scores. However, compared with children in some less developed countries like Benin where some children, especially girls, end their education after the elementary level, education in the United States is compulsory to age 16 regardless of race or class. It is anticipated that over half of public education students will be required to pass standards-based assessments which expect that all students to be at least exposed to algebra by high school and exit prepared for college.

Researchers have not reached consensus about the causes of the academic achievement gap; instead, there exists a wide range of studies that cite an array of factors, both cultural and structural, that influence student performance in school. Sociologist Annette Lareau suggested that students who lack middle-class cultural capital and have limited parental involvement are likely to have lower academic achievement than their better resourced peers. Other researchers suggest that academic achievement is more closely tied to race and socioeconomic status and have tried to pinpoint why.

== Gender achievement gap ==
For the past fifty years, there has been a gap in the educational achievement of males and females in the United States, but which gender has been disadvantaged has fluctuated over the years. In the 1970s and 1980s, data showed girls trailing behind boys in a variety of academic performance measures, specifically in test scores in math and science.

Data in the last twenty years shows the general trend of girls outperforming boys in academic achievement in terms of class grades across all subjects and college graduation rates, but boys scoring higher on standardized tests and being better represented in the higher-paying and more prestigious job fields such as STEM (science, technology, engineering, and math). Male students consistently achieved worse school marks than female students from 1913 to 2011 in all countries for which there is data.

=== Literacy ===
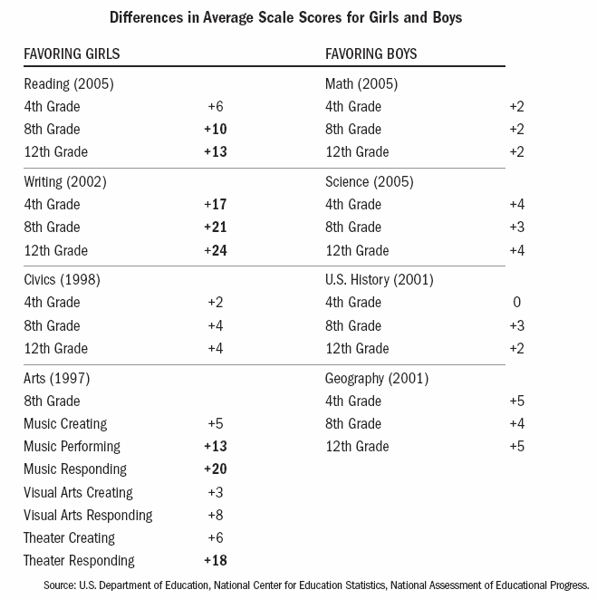
Achievement gaps between boys and girls in the United States are more pronounced in reading and writing than in math and science.

Traditionally, girls have outperformed boys in reading and writing. Although this gap may be minimal in kindergarten, it grows as students continue their education. According to the 2004 National Reading Assessment measured by the US Department of Education, the gap between boys and girls, only slightly noticeable in 4th grade, left boys 14 points behind girls during their 12th grade year. On the 2008 test, female students continued to have higher average reading scores than male students at all three ages. The gap between male and female 4th graders was 7 points in 2008. By 12th grade, there was an 11-point gap between males and females.

On the 2002 National Writing Assessment, boys scored on average 17 points lower than girls in 4th grade. The average gap increased to 21 points by 8th grade and widened to 24 points by senior year in high school. In the more recent 2007 National Assessment of Writing Skills, female students continued to score higher than male students, though margins closed slightly from previous assessments. The average score for female eighth-graders was 20 points higher than males, down 1 point from the 2002 score. For twelfth-graders, females outscored males by 18 points as opposed to 21 points in 2002.

All of these assessments were conducted on a 100-point scale.

=== Math and science ===
Which gender is disadvantaged by the gap in math and science achievement largely depends on how academic achievement is being measured. Female students generally have better grades in their math classes, and this gap starts off very minimal but increases with age. However, males score higher on standardized math tests, and these score gaps also increase with age. Male students also score higher on measures of college readiness, such as the AP Calculus exams and the math section of the SAT.

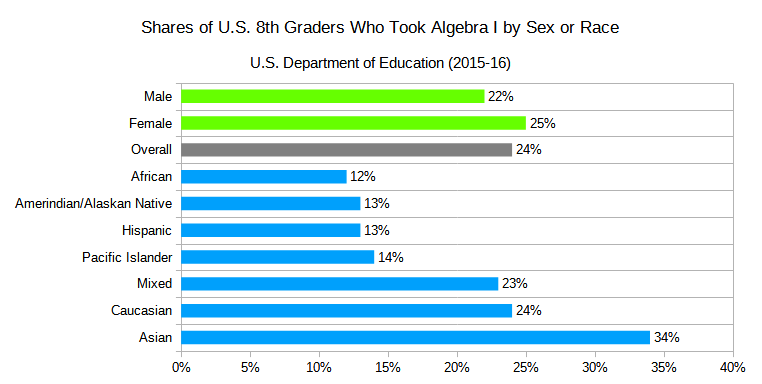
Significant race or sex differences exist in the completion of Algebra I.

The differences in National Assessment for Educational Progress (NAEP) math scores between boys and girls nearly double from the 9-year-olds to the 17-year-olds. This inconsistency in which gender shows more achievement could be due to the fact that class grades, especially in middle and high school, usually depend on a student's completion of homework assignments, and studies have shown that girls report spending more time on homework than boys. The gender gap in mathematics is particularly large among the highest-achieving students; for example, there is a 2.1 to 1 male-female ratio among students who score an 800 on the math portion of the SAT.

At least one study has challenged the existence of the gender gap in mathematics. In 2008 Janet Hyde and others published a study showing that male and female students did equally well on No Child Left Behind standardized tests that were administered in second through eleventh grades in ten states. However, Hyde and her team did find gaps that favored males at the upper end of the achievement distribution and tried to examine gaps on more difficult test questions (previous research has shown that males outperform females on more challenging items), but the tests they examined lacked adequately challenging items. This raised questions about whether there is still a gender gap in math achievement. However, a different study published after Hyde's using NAEP data from all 50 states found a small mean sex difference in favor of males in grades 4, 8, and 12 that had remained stable through the 1990s and 2000s, as well as a 2:1 male to female ratio at the highest scores.

There is also a large discrepancy between the number of men and women working in STEM fields. Women have been, and continue to be, underrepresented in these fields. This underrepresentation is evident in the distribution of college majors among men and women; from 1997 to 2007, women earned only 18% of engineering bachelor's degrees.

=== Degree attainment ===
(Issued August 2003) Educational attainment by race and gender: 2000[25]
Census 2000 Brief
Percent of Adults 25 and over in group
Men . . . . . . . . . . . . .               80.1 52.5 26.1 10.0
Women. . . . . . . . . . . . . . . . . .    80.7 51.1 22.8  7.8
HS = high school completed SC = some college
BA = bachelor's degree AD = advanced degree

According to 2007 data, 55 percent of college students were females and 45 percent were males. From 1995 until 2005, the number of males enrolled in college increased by 18 percent, while the number of female students rose by 27 percent. Males are enrolling in college in greater numbers than ever before, yet fewer than two-thirds of them are graduating with a bachelor's degree. The numbers of both men and women receiving a bachelor's degree have increased significantly, but the increasing rate of female college graduates exceeds the increasing rate for males.

In 2014, the percentage of women with bachelor's degrees was higher than the percentage of men with bachelor's degrees for the first time in America. Women also earn more master's degrees and doctorates than men.

=== Lifetime earnings ===
Although more women are graduating with undergraduate degrees, men are still earning disproportionately more in their lifetimes. This could be due to many factors, including different types of jobs for males and females. Females are greatly underrepresented in science and engineering fields, which are typically correlated with high lifetime earnings. Males and females also have vastly different labor market histories based on type of job and time spent in each job.

=== Possible causes ===
==== Teacher interactions ====
How a student interacts with and is evaluated by his or her teachers is closely correlated with that student's future academic achievement. According to researcher Thomas Good, there are two competing views of how teachers can indirectly impact the achievement of their students. The first is that teachers are more likely to give special attention and extra assistance to students who appear to be struggling in their class. In reading and writing classes, male students are often behind female students in terms of achievement. Therefore, male students are more likely to get more teacher attention, and this extra interaction could give males an advantage in terms of future achievement. The second view is that teachers demand more of and show more respect toward students who they view to be high achievers, which creates a cycle in which only students who are perceived to be intelligent receive extra help and teacher attention.

==== Teacher evaluations ====
How teachers perceive students' knowledge and abilities varies by gender and influences classroom processes and student achievement in both reading and math. Teachers usually have higher expectations for students they view as higher achievers and treat these students with more respect. A study by Tach and Farkas has also found that when students are split into reading groups based on their abilities, the students in the higher-ability reading groups are more likely to demonstrate positive learning behaviors and higher achievement.

Teachers are more likely to favor girls when evaluating what types of readers students seem to be. Because studies have shown that teacher perceptions of students can determine how much individualized attention a student receives and can serve as an indicator of future academic progress, if teachers underestimate males' reading abilities and use ability grouping in their classrooms, male students might be put at a disadvantage and have their learning in reading classes be negatively affected. The opposite trend has been found in math classes. Teachers still tend to view math as a "masculine" subject and tend to have higher expectations for and better attitude towards their male students in these classes.

A study by Fennema et al. has also shown that teachers tend to name males when asked to list their "best math students". Females are more likely than males to be negatively impacted by this underestimation of their math abilities. These gender-specific evaluations from teachers are implicit; usually the teachers have no idea that they are favoring one gender over the other until they are shown concrete evidence, such as a video recording of their classroom. However, even though the discrimination is implicit, it still has negative effects on both male and female students.

There is conflicting evidence about whether teacher assessments of student performance and ability are consistent with cognitive assessments like standardized tests. Teacher assessment evidence comes from a relatively small number of classrooms when compared to standardized tests, which are administered in every public school in all fifty states.

==== Stereotyping ====
There is speculation that gender stereotyping within classrooms can also lead to differences in academic achievement and representation for female and male students. Math and science are often perceived as "masculine" subjects because they lead to success in "masculine" fields, such as medicine and engineering. English and history, on the other hand, are often perceived as "feminine" subjects because they are more closely aligned with "feminine" jobs, such as teaching or care work. These stereotypes can influence student achievement in these areas.

Research on stereotype threat has shown that gender stereotypes decrease the mathematical self-esteem of many female students, and that this lack of academic confidence leads to anxiety and poorer performance on math exams.

==== Parent socialization ====
How a child's parents view his or her skills can also contribute to the gender achievement gap in education. A study by Jacobs and Eccles has shown that adults rate female children as having better social skills than male children, and that girls are more likely to be seen as "good children" than boys. These gender-based stereotypes can perpetuate the gender achievement gap in education by influencing parents' perceptions of their children's skills, and these perceptions can influence the types of activities and subjects parents steer their children toward.

==== Socio-economic factors ====
The gender achievement gap, measured by standardized test scores, suspensions, and absences, in favor of female students, is larger at worse schools and among lower-income households. So poverty and school quality are partially responsible for the gap.

==== Self-regulation and conscientiousness ====
Girls tend to have better self-regulation skills than boys. Self-regulation skills correlate with time spent on homework and time spent taking notes in class. This contributes to girls getting better grades than boys in all subjects. See Sex differences in psychology.

==== Biology ====
The idea that one gender is on average inherently, genetically intellectually inferior is controversial and critics of the idea attribute it to historical or contemporary sexism.

Most researchers have argued for no significant sex differences in g factor or general intelligence, while others have argued for greater intelligence for males, and others for females. These results depend on the methodology, tests researchers used for their claims, and the personal performances of the participants.

Assuming there are real gender differences in general intelligence, it is difficult to answer the nature versus nurture question—whether any such differences are inherently genetic, or are caused by environmental factors. Differences in gender roles in a particular culture, as well as sexism, can influence a person's interests, opportunities, and activities in a way that might increase or decrease intellectual abilities for any particular task. For ethical and practical reasons, it is not generally feasible to perform an experiment that raises children without a gender identity or which randomly assigns a gender identity, to distinguish the effects of socialization from genetics.

Researchers concerned with the achievement gap between genders cite biological differences, such as brain structure and development, as a possible reason why one gender outperforms the other in certain subjects. For example, a Virginia Tech Study conducted in 2000 examined the brains of 508 children and found that different areas of the brain develop in a different sequence in girls compared to boys.

The differing maturation speed of the brain between boys and girls affects how each gender processes information and could have implications for how they perform in school.

=== Implications ===
It is important to address the gender achievement gap in education because failure to cultivate the academic talents of any one group will have aggregate negative consequences. If women are underrepresented in STEM fields, and if men are underrepresented in the social sciences and humanities, both genders are missing opportunities to develop diverse skill sets that can help them in the workplace.

If the gender achievement gap in education continues to exist, so does the stereotype that medicine, science, and engineering are all "masculine" fields and that women belong in fields like teaching, counseling, or social work. This stereotype can lead to the image that women who pursue careers in the STEM fields are seen as "nerdy" or "geeky", and this can have a detrimental effect on the self-esteem of females who do choose to enter these fields.

Researchers have found that the gender achievement gap has a large impact on the future career choices of high-achieving students. Part of this is a result of the college majors that men and women choose; men are more likely to major in engineering or the hard sciences, while women are more likely to receive degrees in English, psychology, or sociology. Therefore, men are statistically more likely to enter careers that have more potential for higher long-term earnings than women.

The careers that are aligned with these majors have different levels of prestige and different salaries, which can lead to a gender wage gap. U.S. Census data indicates that women who work full-time earn only 77% of what their male counterparts earn. For men and women who are ten years out of college, women earn only 69% of the salaries of their male workers.

=== Attempts to reduce the gender gap ===
There have been several studies done of interventions aimed at reducing the gender achievement gap in science classes. Some interventions, such as instituting mentoring programs aimed at women or restructuring the course curriculum, have had limited success. The most successful interventions have been a form of psychological interventions called values affirmation. In a famous study of women's achievement in college science by Miyake et al., values affirmation was successful in reducing the differences between male and female academic achievement in college-level introductory physics classes, and it has been particularly effective at combating the psychological phenomenon known as stereotype threat.

Values affirmation exercises require students to either write about their most important values or their least important values two times at the beginning of the 15-week course. After this intervention, the modal grades of women enrolled in the course increased from a C to a B. Psychological interventions such as this one show promise for increasing women's achievement in math and science courses and reducing the achievement gap that exists between the genders in these subject areas, but further research will need to be done in order to determine whether the positive effects are long-lasting.

== LGBTQ achievement gap ==
The LGBTQ achievement gap refers to the difference in academic performance and achievement between LGBTQ youth and their heterosexual peers. Historically, the circumstance of LGBTQ youth in education has received little attention from scholars and the media. The term LGBTQ refers to lesbian, gay, bisexual, transgender, and queer persons but often is understood to encompass the sexual minority. Before the turn of the century, little research went into the topic of the LGBTQ population in schools. However, with the Gay, Lesbian and Straight Education Network's (GLSEN) recurring study on school climate in the U.S. for LGBTQ students, there is now more information indicating the existence of an achievement gap. LGBTQ students in the U.S. tend to have lower GPAs than their heterosexual peers, as well as higher truancy and dropout rates. There are many supposed causes of this achievement gap, as well as efforts to alleviate the disparity.

In United States secondary schools, LGBTQ youth often have more difficult experiences compared to their heterosexual peers, leading to observed underachievement, though current data is limited. In Massachusetts, LGBTQ youth are 12% less likely to make A and B grades than their heterosexual peers. A GLSEN survey in 2011 found that 92.3%(76.1% in 2021 survey) of LGBTQ youth report experienced verbal harassment in schools once within the last year with 48.9%(29.8% in 2021 survey) reporting it more often or frequently. Among LGBTQ youth, those who endure more severe harassment report significantly lower GPAs than LGBT youth who endure less harassment (2.9 to 3.2, respectively). Less-harassed LGBTQ youth are also twice as likely to plan for higher education than their highly victimized peers.

Dropping out and absenteeism are also concerns with LGBTQ youth. According to the National Education Association's report on LGBTQ students, gay and bisexual students are almost twice as likely to consider dropping out as heterosexual students, and transgender students are even more likely. High instances of dropping out prevent LGBTQ students from pursuing higher education. Because most studies focus on students enrolled in school and it is hard to find a sample of student youth out of school, an accurate count of LGBTQ youth who have dropped out of school is hard to obtain. While many LGBTQ students do not drop out, they often miss school because they feel unsafe. Nationwide, about 50% of students enduring severe verbal harassment, and 70% of students enduring severe physical harassment miss school once a month out of concern for their safety. Studies in Massachusetts schools indicate that LGBTQ students are up to six times more likely than heterosexual students to miss school. Likewise, students in California who endure harassment "because of actual or perceived sexual orientation" are three times as likely as non-harassed heterosexual students to miss school, meaning even heterosexual students harassed for suspected sexual orientation endure some of these problems.

Despite such evidence of negative experiences, some LGBTQ find positive benefits in coming out. Students who are out, while receiving increased harassment from homophobic peers, have lower instances of depression and a greater sense of belonging, a phenomenon well documented in other LGBTQ studies as well.

Though popular belief attributes homosexuality to higher education levels, more current studies suggest otherwise, at least among women. An extensive nationwide survey conducted by the Centers for Disease Control and Prevention indicates that, among women, LGBTQ identity is inversely related to education level, meaning that for every progressive education level, the percentage of women identifying as LGBTQ steadily decreases. For instance, while 6.7% of women with no high school diploma identify as lesbian, bisexual, or something else, only 2.9% of women with a bachelor's degree or higher identify that way. The same study showed no statistically significant correlation between LGBTQ identity and education for men. Studies on LGBTQ students in college show that LGBTQ students, while not enduring the same harassment and struggles as LGBTQ youth in high schools, still have different experiences than their heterosexual peers, sometimes for the better: gay men in college have significantly higher GPAs and are more involved in extra-curricular activities than their heterosexual peers. A study has in fact found a positive correlation between educational attainment and homosexuality and non-exclusive heterosexuality among men. In the study, gay men were significantly less likely to fail to graduate from high school compared to completely heterosexual men (3.94% vs. 9.91%) and were more likely to complete college (43.86% vs. 26.46%). Additionally, about 52% of gay men age 25 and older hold a bachelor's degree, which is higher than the national average. Joel Mittleman, a sociologist from the University of Notre Dame finds that gay men tend to value studying over activities like video games or sports that heterosexual men typically enjoy. Mittleman states that gay men consistently perform better than straight men regardless of race, but the same cannot be said for lesbian women—black gay women perform much worse than their white counterparts. Lesbian and bisexual women, however, report being much less satisfied with their education than heterosexual women in college.

=== Causes ===
There are many possible explanations for the LGBTQ achievement gap. With extensive studies into the personal experiences of LGBTQ youth by the GLSEN, the Gay and Lesbian Task Force, and other organizations, some issues relevant to LGBTQ youth stand out as affecting academic outcomes.

The most highly documented and widely studied cause of underachievement by LGBTQ students is the problem of bullying in schools. Out of students of any sexual identity who feel unsafe at school, 60% feel so because of their sexual orientation. More specifically, a bully's perception of a student's sexual orientation or gender-nonconformity—not necessarily the individual's actual sexual identity—leads to bullying. Because of this, a gender-nonconforming yet heterosexual student could experience some of the same academic outcomes attributed to the LGBTQ students. 33% of LGBTQ students nationwide have skipped school at least once in a single month for personal safety, and these students who have missed school are three times more likely to attempt suicide than those who have not missed school.

In addition to their schooling experience, LGBTQ youth often have negative home environments. LGBTQ youth have a unique situation in that they may not find any support from their family. Upon coming out to their parents, 50% of LGBTQ teens met a negative reaction. Two studies indicate that approximately 30% of LGBTQ youth encountered physical violence and 26% were kicked out of the house. This risk is higher for transgender teens. Because of these negative home environments, the National Gay and Lesbian Task Force, based on studies in Seattle, estimates that 40% of all homeless youth in the United States are LGBTQ, compared to roughly 3.5% of the general population. In addition to these homeless youths' higher risk for sexual violence, drug abuse, and prostitution, all of which would affect performance (or general attendance) in school, these youth may not be able to enroll in school at all. Some public schools are either reluctant to or ignorant about enrolling homeless students, significantly thwarting a teen's pursuit of educational opportunities.

=== Proposed solutions ===
Government-based as well as independent organizations focusing on education or LGBTQ issues have proposed solutions to improving the experiences of LGBTQ youth in schools. One such solution is the inclusion of LGBTQ-related subjects in a school's curriculum, shown to improve LGBTQ youths' performance in school. When surveyed, school personnel in California, Massachusetts, and Minnesota ranked lesson plans as the top need in addressing LGBTQ concerns. The Sexuality Information and Education Council of the United States proposes including LGBTQ curriculum in school health and sex education classes. Their proposed curriculum would aim to teach students, over the course of their K–12 education, to understand sexual orientation as well as gender roles, and treat others with respect, among other key concepts. However, many states in the U.S. including Alabama, Texas, Arizona, and others, have laws explicitly prohibiting the inclusion of homosexuality in education. Alabama and Texas laws even require teachers to refrain from presenting homosexuality as an acceptable lifestyle. Significant opposition to changing these statutes exist in these states, preventing the inclusion of LGBTQ curriculum.

The NEA recommends the inclusion of specific school policies protecting LGBTQ from harassment and bullying. LGBTQ students in Massachusetts who attend schools with safety policies explicitly regarding LGBTQ students are 3.5 times more likely to make A and B grades than LGBTQ youth in other schools. Additionally, student organizations such as gay-straight alliances (GSAs) can improve the experience of LGBTQ youth in schools. Even when LGBTQ students do not participate in their school's GSA, the very presence of the organization can reduce threat and injury of LGBTQ students by one-third, and reduce LGBTQ suicide attempts by almost 50%. LGBTQ students in Massachusetts schools with GSAs were twice as likely to earn A and B grades than LGBTQ students in schools without GSAs.

== Immigrant and native-born gap ==
Educational attainment rates change when it comes to comparing the same races against immigrants or foreign born students. No matter which race is examined, immigrants of that race outperform natives of the same race. For example, Black African and Caribbean immigrant groups to the U.S. report having higher levels of education than any other group. Of all foreign-born U.S. residents, foreign born Africans (those who come from the African continent) nowadays have a higher level of educational attainment than any other racial or ethnic group in the United States. They tend to be highly educated and be fluent in English. This trend was first reported in the 1990s by the Journal of Blacks in Higher Education, and still continues today.

According to data from the 2000 United States census, "43.8 percent of African immigrants had achieved a college degree, compared with 42.5 of Asian Americans, 28.9 percent of immigrants from Europe, Russia and Canada and 23.1 percent of the U.S. population as a whole." The educational attainment amount varies by group. According to the U.S. Census, out of the African populations, Nigerians reported to having the highest level of education.

== Religion ==
The amount of education completed varies greatly between members of religions in the United States. Hindus and Jews, for example, are more likely than general population to have completed a college education, whereas members of Evangelical churches, historically Black Protestant churches and Jehovah's Witness are less likely (21%, 15% and 12% respectively).

US religions ranked by percentage reporting a college degree:

Rank	Name	High school or less	Some college	College grad	Post-grad	Total college+
1	Hindu	12	11	29	48	77
2	Jewish	19	22	29	31	59
3	Buddhist	20	33	28	20	47
4	Atheist	26	31	26	16	43
5	Agnostic	23	36	25	16	42
6	Orthodox Christian	27	34	21	18	40
7	Muslim	36	25	23	17	39
8	Other faiths	29	38	-	-	34
9	Mormon	27	40	23	10	33
10	Mainline Protestant	37	30	19	14	33
11	Other Christian	26	43	-	-	31
12	Unaffiliated	38	32	18	11	29
	General population	41	32	17	11	27
13	Catholic	46	27	16	10	26
14	Nothing in particular	45	32	15	9	24
15	Evangelical Protestant	43	35	14	7	21
16	Historically Black Protestant	52	33	9	6	15
17	Jehovah's Witnesses	63	25	9	3	12

== Deaf vs. hearing ==
Educational attainment (U.S., 2015, adults 25–64)
Group	High school	Some college	Bachelor's	Higher degree
Hearing	89%	63%	33%	12%
Deaf or hearing impaired with no additional disability	88%	56%	23%	8%
Deaf or hearing impaired with ambulatory disability	74%	41%	9%	4%
Deaf or hearing impaired and blind	72%	40%	11%	4%
Deaf or hearing impaired and cognitive disability	72%	38%	9%	3%
Deaf or hearing impaired and independent living difficulty	71%	36%	9%	3%

== See also ==
- Math–verbal achievement gap
- Occupational segregation
- Racial achievement gap in the United States
- Soft bigotry of low expectations
- Standards based education reform

General:

- Education in the United States
