= National Achievement Test =

Filipino standardized test for students

The National Achievement Test (NAT) is a standardized set of examinations taken in the Philippines by students in Grades 3, 6, 10 to 12. The test is designed to determine their academic levels, strengths and weaknesses, as well as their knowledge learnt in major subjects throughout the year.

NAT examinations aim to provide observational information on the achievement level of students to serve as guide for principals and teachers in their respective courses of action. It also identifies and analyzes variations on achievement levels across the years by region, division, school and other variables. It determines the rate of improvement in basic education with respect to individual schools within certain time frames.

== History of the National Achievement Test ==
The National College Entrance Examination (NCEE) was abolished in 1994 through Executive Order no. 632 by then Education Secretary Raul Roco and was replaced by the National Elementary Achievement Test (NEAT) and the National Secondary Achievement Test (NSAT). When the Department of Education, Culture and Sports (DECS) was officially converted into the Department of Education (DepEd), the NEAT and NSAT were also abolished and replaced by the National Achievement Test (NAT).

== Purpose ==
The test is a system-based assessment designed to gauge learning outcomes across target levels in identified periods of basic education. Empirical information on the achievement level of pupils/students serve as a guide for policy makers, administrators, curriculum planners, principles, and teachers, along with analysis on the performance of regions, divisions, schools, and other variables overseen by DepEd.

NAT Examination Information
Grade	Examinee	Description
Grade 3 (Elementary School)	All students in both public and private schools.	Serves as an entrance assessment for the intermediate level.
Grade 6 (Elementary School)	All students in both public and private schools.	One of the entrance examinations to proceed in Junior High School.
Grade 10 (Junior High School)	All students in both public and private schools.	One of the entrance examinations to proceed in Senior High School.
Grade 12 (Senior High School)	Graduating students in both public and private schools.	Taken for purposes of systems evaluation; not a prerequisite for graduation or college enrollment.

== Structure ==
The NAT is a standardized multiple-choice test that consists of several competencies with "moderately difficult items" based on Bloom's Taxonomy of Cognitive Objectives/Dimensions.

Test	NAT G3	NAT G6	NAT Y2
Subject Area Coverage	1. Science; 2. Mathematics; 3. English; 4. Filipino	1. Science; 2. Mathematics; 3. English; 4. Filipino	1. Science; 2. Mathematics; 3. English; 4. Filipino; 5. Social Studies (Araling Panlipunan)
Number of Items Per Subject	30	50	60
Total Number of Items	120	250	300
