= Math–verbal achievement gap =

Disparity in American standardized exams

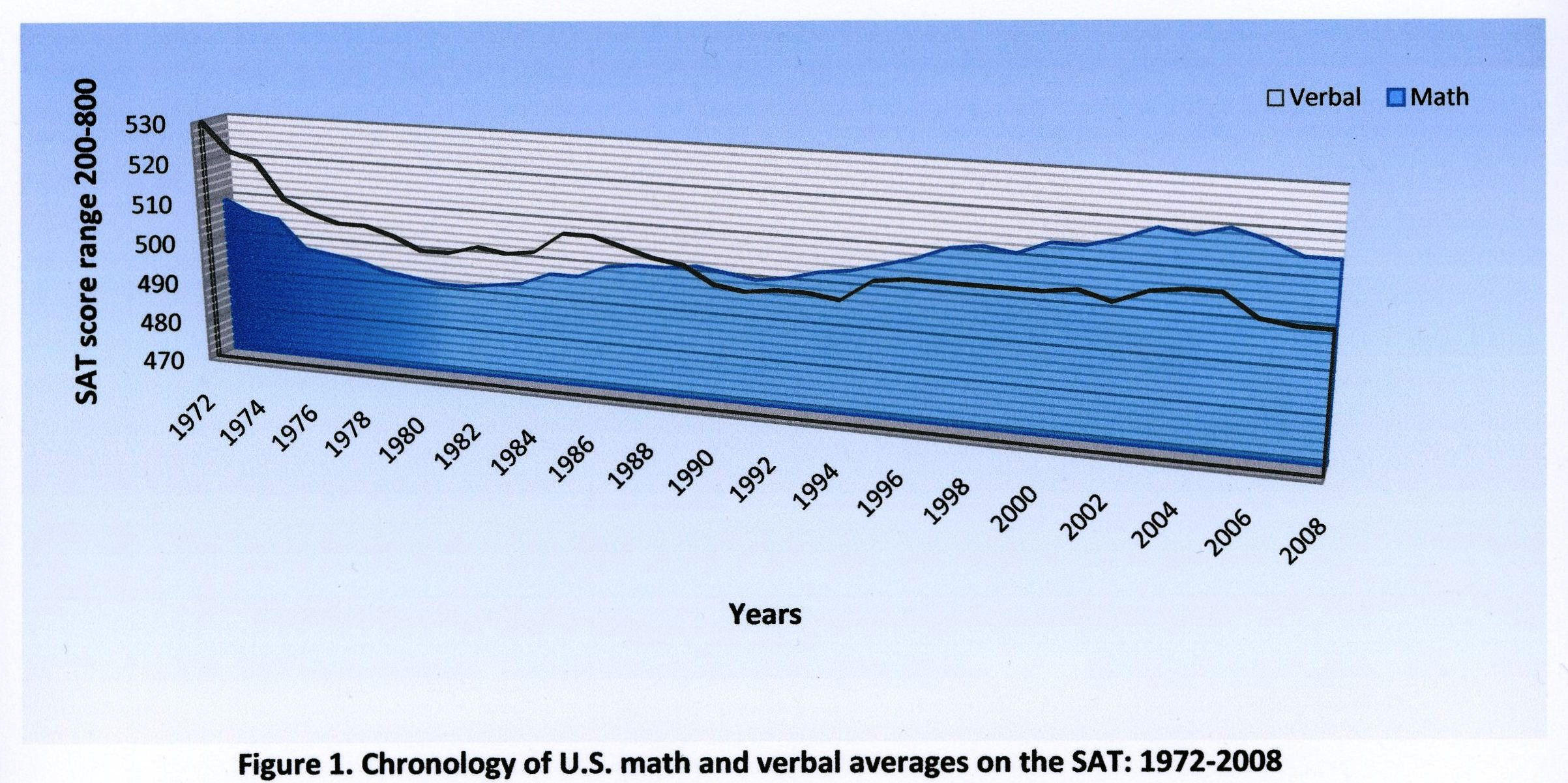
Graph showing the Math–Verbal Achievement Gap in the United States

The math–verbal achievement gap is a phenomenon first observed by Richard Rothstein in a brief 2002 article written in The New York Times. This achievement gap reveals a growing disparity in the United States between the rising national average on the math portions of the college entry SAT and ACT exams, as opposed to the flat-lining verbal portions on the same tests.

== Historical trends ==
Around 1990 the national average on the math portion of the SAT began its slow but steady ascension over the national average for the verbal portion. It took only one decade for the math average to eclipse the verbal average, continuing to widen since that point. The difference was sizable and significant: in 1992, the average math score on the SAT was 501, similar to the average verbal score of 500. In the decade that followed, the math score increased by fifteen points while the verbal score increased by only four. However, this was not always the case. In fact, in the 1970s the relationship was precisely the opposite when national verbal scores routinely trumped the national math average by similar margins. Since then, the point gap between the math and evidence-based reading and writing (EBRW) tests has closed significantly: the class of 2019 had an average math test score of 528 and an average EBRW score of 531. Because 50 more points are required to meet the math benchmark than the EBRW benchmark, only 48% of the class of 2019 met the math benchmark while 68% met the EBRW benchmark.

The first academic analysis of this gap was conducted by James Lech Ed.D., M.T.S. Lech posited that this gap could be "collateral damage" from the well-documented academic and social "erosion" known as dumbing-down. In other words, the SAT math questions progressively eased in difficulty over time while the verbal difficulty levels 1) remained constant, or 2) dumbed-down at much slower rates.

== Testing the "dumbing down" hypothesis ==
To test that hypothesis Lech constructed scores of survey instruments compiled from the math questions derived from publicly released SATs from the early 1980s through 2005. The survey instruments were intentionally created to conceal the source of the questions in order to reduce reader-bias towards standardized testing. They were then disseminated to more than 1,500 qualified high school math teachers that were randomly selected from a pool of every high school (both public and private) in the United States. Their responses were tabulated. Lech found that the SAT math questions were not getting easier at all in the eyes of these math teachers; in fact they were getting slightly harder.

== Alternative hypotheses ==
The research hypothesis Lech tested was rejected: the questions on the math portions of the SAT are not getting easier over time. As noted, they are getting a little harder. This confounds the math-verbal achievement gap in general. There were several proposals put forth to explain rising national averages, year-after-year, on the difficult math portions of the SAT, as opposed to stagnating national verbal averages on the same test, during the same three decades.

=== Rothstein's theories ===
Rothstein, in the 2002 New York Times article, admitted that "Nobody really knows why we seem to make more progress in math than reading. But one likely cause is that students learn math mostly in school, while literacy also comes from habits at home. Even if reading instruction improves, scores would suffer if students did less out-of-school reading or had a less literate home environment."

Rothstein also suggested that the hugely successful SAT and ACT test preparation courses are unwittingly emphasizing mathematical prowess over verbal acuity. He rationalized that successful test-taking techniques taught in these courses to boost test scores work very well for multiple-choice math questions.

Rothstein also highlighted that English-language-learners (hereinafter ELL) in American schools were on the increase, and certainly that could have a downward pull on the national verbal average on these standardized tests. It would seem likely that ELL status would adversely affect a student's verbal score to a greater extent as opposed to the mathematics portion on the same standardized test.

Finally, Rothstein indicated that studies revealed then, as they still do now, that student reading was on the decline while television-watching by American youth was on the increase. These dual social trends, when combined, could negatively impact student verbal scores at higher rates than their math scores. These behaviors also lower math scores—a point that Rothstein could have overlooked. What Rothstein could not anticipate in 2002 is the exponential proliferation of text messages teenagers send and receive, and the potential for negative ramifications of that activity when it comes to progressing with their verbal skills. The New York Times notes that this "phenomenon is beginning to worry physicians and psychologists, who say it is leading to anxiety, distraction in school, falling grades, repetitive stress injury and sleep deprivation." There may indeed be cause for concern as Neilsen's reported in 2008 that "American teenagers sent and received an average of 2,272 text messages per month in the fourth quarter of 2008 ... almost 80 messages a day, more than double the average of a year earlier (Ibid.). Neilsen's 2010 report indicates a 47 percent increase in teen texting to 3,339 texts per month (4,050 for female teens).

=== Lech's theories ===
Lech's alternative suggestions for further research in that 2007 dissertation indicated that it is quite likely the math–verbal achievement gap could be partially explained by the rapid proliferation of math and science Advanced Placement courses in American high schools. This wave of science and math AP courses, over that of humanities AP courses, is rising concurrently with higher math scores over that of verbal scores on these standardized tests. He added that this effect could be multiplied if large numbers of savvy students are front-loading the math and science AP courses in high school to intentionally "bone-up" for corresponding sections on the SAT/ACT. Indeed there does seem to be a solid preference for better math and science marks by college admission personnel. This would simultaneously explain both better scores on the math portions of the SAT/ACT and stagnating verbal scores on those tests. After all, AP English in 12th grade will not provide praxis for college-entry tests taken in 11th grade.

Lech also contended that migration from South Asia, West Asia, and East Asia during these same decades could also be positively influencing these rising SAT math scores (while simultaneously suppressing the verbal scores as many of those students may also be ELL students as well). That's because he noted the number of Asian students taking the SAT are disproportionately overrepresented during the very years when this math–verbal gap really takes form. Of the students taking the SAT, the proportion or percentage who are Asian is more than double the Asian proportion [or percentage] in the U.S. population. That is significant because, as Lech pointed out, Asian students themselves averaged 580 (out of a possible 800) on the math portion of the SAT in 2005, but the national math average that same year (which mathematically includes those high-scoring Asian students) was only 520.

Lastly, Lech agreed with Rothstein that another influence on the math–verbal achievement gap could be the quality of the math teachers themselves. Lech referenced literature indicating that U.S. math teachers tend to be much better organized than their humanities counterparts across the hall. Rothstein held that American math teachers tend to be better trained because they have more resources available, such as the extremely large $1 billion cash grant from the National Science Foundation for math and science instruction in high school, which English teachers cannot reap.

== See also ==
- Achievement gap in the United States
