= Global Assessment Certificate =

The Global Assessment Certificate program (also known as the GAC, /ʤiː eɪ siː/, jee-ay-see) is a university preparation and foundation studies program that provides students from mostly non-English-speaking backgrounds with academic knowledge and skills to prepare them for western-style postsecondary study. It is owned and developed by ACT Education Solutions, Ltd. (AES), an international subsidiary of ACT, Inc.

The GAC is recognized for admissions and credit transfer purposes by more than 90 universities around the globe, including The University of Iowa, LIU Post, the University of Idaho, Oklahoma State University, Southern Oregon University (in the United States), Griffith University, University Technology Sydney, Bond, La Trobe, and RMIT (in Australia) for admissions purposes and is considered an alternative or addition to Year 12 for international students.

The GAC is licensed to teaching centers (known as ‘Approved Teaching Centers’ or ATCs). The program is monitored and moderated by AES staff based at the organization's regional offices in Shanghai, Jakarta and Singapore. It is not currently accredited.

== GAC course structure ==
The GAC can be delivered full-time or part-time as a concurrent co-curriculum with the high school curriculum. The minimum requirements for delivery of the program are 720 hours of face-to-face instruction and 360 hours of independent study, half of which must be supervised. The program is continuously assessed and all assessments are moderated by ACT Education Solutions.

Level I

Six mandatory modules with a total of 240 hours of face-to-face study, plus 120 hours independent study. Includes academic English, study skills, mathematics, computing, and communication skills.

Level II

Two mandatory academic English modules, plus four of six specialization modules across the areas of business, computing, mathematics, science, psychology and social science. Electives in IELTS or TOEFL preparation are available.

Level III

Two mandatory academic English modules plus four of six specialization modules across the areas of business, computing, mathematics, science, psychology and social science. ACT Test preparation is also available.

== GAC GPA scale ==
The GAC Grade Point Average (GPA) scale is based on a four-point scale with a passing grade of 55% (GPA 0.6). Grading criteria for each assessment are clearly stipulated in documentation provided to Approved Teaching Centers (ATCs) and teachers and directors of studies are trained by ACT Education Solutions, Limited's academic staff in the correct application of the grading criteria. All grades are finalized by ACT Education Solutions, Limited's academic staff prior to posting on ACT Education Solutions, Limited's secure online database, iTAP. Higher education institutions can verify GAC graduates' certificates and transcripts through the iTAP database.

GRADE	POINTS	DESCRIPTION	% GUIDE
A	4.00	Very high achievement	94–100
A-	3.60		90–93
B+	3.30		87–89
B	3.00	High achievement	83–86
B-	2.60		80–82
C+	2.30		77–79
C	2.00	Average achievement	73–76
C-	1.60		70–72
D+	1.30		67–69
D	1.00	Pass	60–66
D-	0.60		55–59

== ACE credit recommendations for the GAC modules ==
The American Council on Education’s (www.acenet.edu) College Credit Recommendation Service (ACE CREDIT) recommended college credit for 15 of the GAC program modules in 2016. ACE found 15 GAC modules to be equivalent to associate degree–level subjects at US colleges and universities. Each was recommended for 3 semester credit hours, up to a total of 44 credit hours.

Information on how each module is recommended for credit is available from ACE’s National Guide, searching under the organization’s name.

GAC Module Number	Recommended # of semester hours in associate degree category
GAC005	3 in computer information systems
GAC006	3 in communications
GAC008	3 in English composition
GAC010	2 in introduction to probability, statistics, and business problem solving
GAC011	3 in computer information systems
GAC012	3 in introduction to business
GAC014	3 in communication
GAC015	3 in English composition
GAC016	3 in calculus
GAC017	3 in Web design
GAC022	3 in international business
GAC023	3 in life sciences
GAC024	3 in discrete mathematics
GAC027	3 in sociology
GAC028	3 in sociology
