= Gail Fullerton =

American academic administrator (1927–2016)

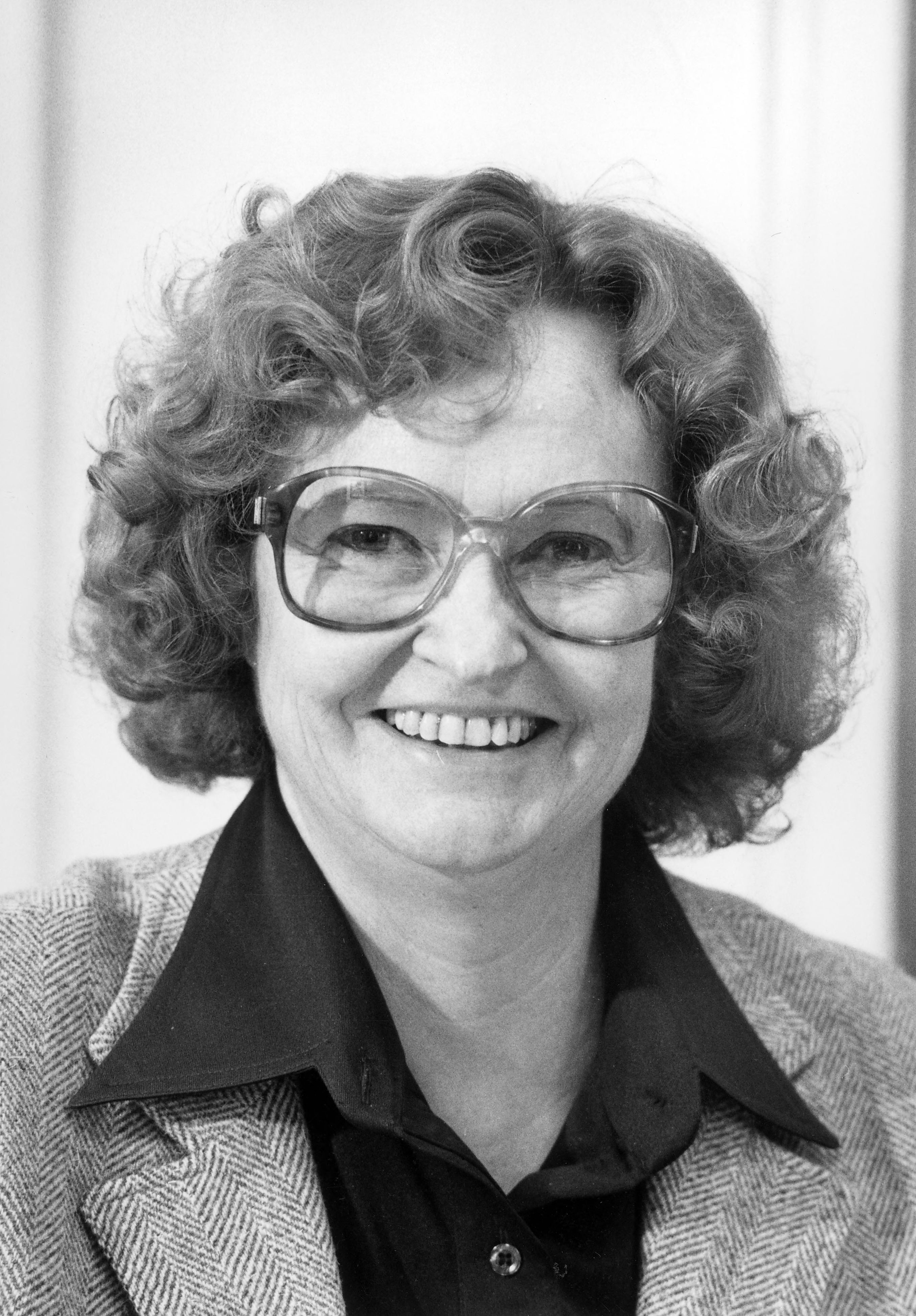

21st President of San José State University
- In office September 1, 1978 – September 30, 1991
- Preceded by: John H. Bunzel
- Succeeded by: J. Handel Evans

Personal details
- Born: Gladys Mae Jackson; April 29, 1927 Lincoln, Nebraska, U.S.
- Died: January 1, 2016 (aged 88) Coos Bay, Oregon, U.S.
- Spouse(s): Snell Putney (div.); Stanley Fullerton
- Education: University of Nebraska (BA, MA); University of Oregon (PhD)

Gladys "Gail" Mae Fullerton (née Jackson; April 29, 1927 – January 1, 2016) was an academic and university administrator at San Jose State University.

== Early life and education ==
Gladys Mae Jackson was born in Frontier County, Nebraska, on April 29, 1927. Her family was greatly affected by the Great Depression, which led her to work in factories during World War II to pay for her college education. In 1949, she earned a BA with a double major in English and speech from the University of Nebraska. She then earned a master's in sociology in 1950 from the same university. In 1954, she and her husband, Snell Putney, were jointly awarded the University of Oregon's first PhD in sociology.

== San Jose State University ==
Fullerton briefly taught at Drake University and Florida State University before arriving at San Jose State University in 1963. Her marriage to Putney initially made her ineligible to earn a tenure-track position at the university due to anti-nepotism rules established by then-President John T. Wahlquist, which was rescinded after Walhquist's departure in 1964. In 1972, Fullerton became the dean of graduate studies, in 1977, she became the executive vice president, and on September 1, 1978, she was fully promoted to be the university's president. She was San Jose State's first female president, and the second faculty member to be promoted to the presidency (the first being Morris Elmer Dailey in 1900).

As president, Fullerton focused on raising graduation rates among student-athletes, and oversaw the construction of the Event Center and the Engineering Building. Fullerton retired from the position on September 30, 1991. Towards the end of her presidency, she advocated for the conversion of the roads that ran through San Jose State's campus into paseos, the project finished in 1993 and created the Paseo de César Chávez and the Paseo de San Carlos.

In 2010, she was awarded the status of President Emeritus.

== Death ==
Fullerton died January 1, 2016, in Coos Bay, Oregon.

== Bibliography ==
- The adjusted American: normal neurosis in the individual and society (1964)
- Survival in marriage: Introduction to family interaction, conflicts, and alternatives (1972)
