= Victory Salute (statue) =

Statue at San Jose State University, United States

- Artist: Rigo 23
- Year: 2005
- Medium: fiberglass and ceramic
- Subject: Tommie Smith and John Carlos
- Dimensions: 670 cm (22 ft)
- Location: San Jose, California, United States; 37°20′7.8″N 121°52′57.2″W
- Owner: San Jose State University

Victory Salute, commonly referred to as the Olympic Black Power Statue, is a monument depicting the 1968 Olympics Black Power salute performed by African-American athletes Tommie Smith and John Carlos. The monument consists of two fiberglass statues covered in ceramic tiles, atop a concrete base designed to emulate the Olympic podium. It was created in 2005 by Portuguese artist Rigo 23 and is installed next to Tower Hall on the San José State University campus, in San Jose, California, United States.

== History ==
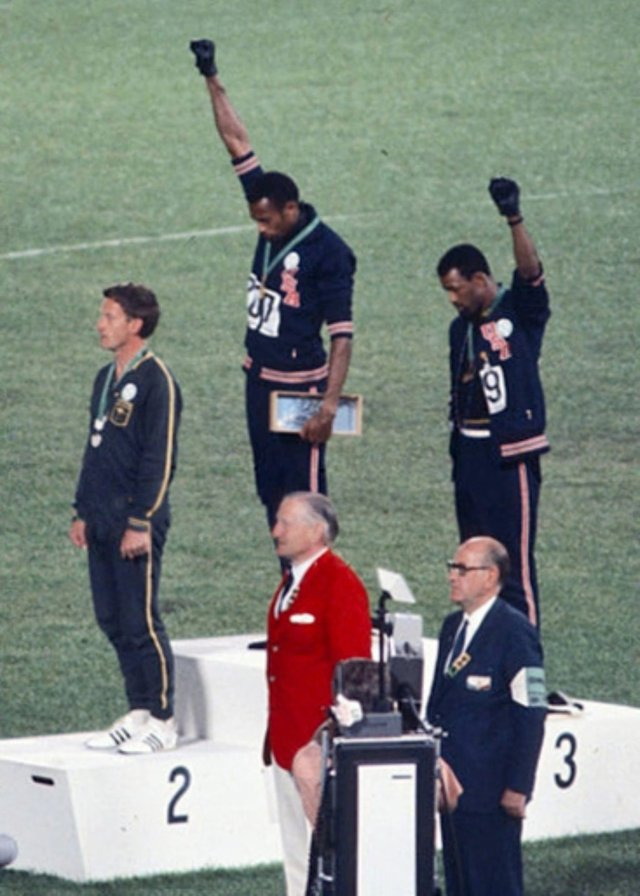
The photo recreated by Victory Salute

In 1968, as members of San Jose State's Speed City era of athletics, Tommie Smith and John Carlos competed in the 1968 Summer Olympics in Mexico City. After earning gold and bronze medals respectively, the duo raised a Black Power salute while "The Star-Spangled Banner" played, which became one of the most defining acts of protest of the civil rights movement. Despite disapproval of the protest among the general public, San Jose State University President Robert D. Clark expressed his support of the act.

In Winter 2002, San Jose State student Erik Grotz initiated a project to honor Smith and Carlos at their alma mater; "One of my professors [Cobie Harris] was talking about unsung heroes and he mentioned Tommie Smith and John Carlos. He said these men had done a courageous thing to advance civil rights, and, yet, they had never been honored by their own school". Grotz worked with Department of Art Chair, Dr. Robert Milnes to create a mock-up to pitch to the university's Associated Students board, who approved the project on December 11, 2002, and began fundraising.

The Associated Students raised over $300,000 for the project and initially intended the statue to be placed next to the now former location of the Scheller House on the Paseo de San Carlos. However, the project was moved to be on the lawn adjacent to the Tower Hall and the Robert D. Clark Hall in order to be in a more central location on campus and to honor President Clark's support of the protest. On October 16, 2003, the 35th anniversary of the protest, Portuguese artist Rigo 23 was announced as the sculptor for the project.

Victory Salute was assembled in early October 2005, and was unveiled to the public on October 17, 2005, drawing hundreds in attendance. A panel discussion was held featuring Smith and Carlos, as well as silver-medalist Peter Norman, fellow Speed City era sprinter Lee Evans, and head coach Payton Jordan. Additional speeches were given by vice-mayor of San Jose Cindy Chavez, San Jose State President Don W. Kassing, and actor Delroy Lindo, followed by honorary doctorate degrees awarded to Smith and Carlos. The statue was unveiled during a performance of "The Star-Spangled Banner", mirroring the original protest.

In January 2007, History San Jose opened a new exhibit called Speed City: From Civil Rights to Black Power, covering the San Jose State athletic program. The exhibit focused on the San Jose State athletic program, highlighting how many student athletes from the Speed city program gained global recognition during Civil Rights and Black Power movements.

In 2008, after critics argued that Victory Salute did not give unfamiliar onlookers the appropriate historical context, a plaque was added in front of the statue. The plaque reads:

At the México City 1968 Olympic Games, San José State University Student-Athletes; Tommie Smith and John Carlos; Stood for Justice, Dignity, Equality, and Peace. Hereby the University and Associated Students; Commemorate their Legacy. October 16, 2005.	Victory Salute plaque (2026)

In 2022, San Jose State students and faculty embedded Victory Salute into their Public Art as Resistance project.

== Design ==
Victory Salute was Rigo 23's first sculpture, but he wanted the statue to be a "labor of love". In order to correctly sculpt the musculature, he took 3D full-body scans of Smith and Carlos. Rigo 23's signature is on the back of Smith's shoe, and the year 2005 is on Carlos's shoe.

The statues' faces were rendered realistically and with emphasis placed on the emotion of the athletes. They were constructed from fiberglass over steel supports and covered with ceramic tiles, their track pants and jackets form a mosaic of dark blue ceramic tiles, with red and white detailing on the stripes of the track suits.

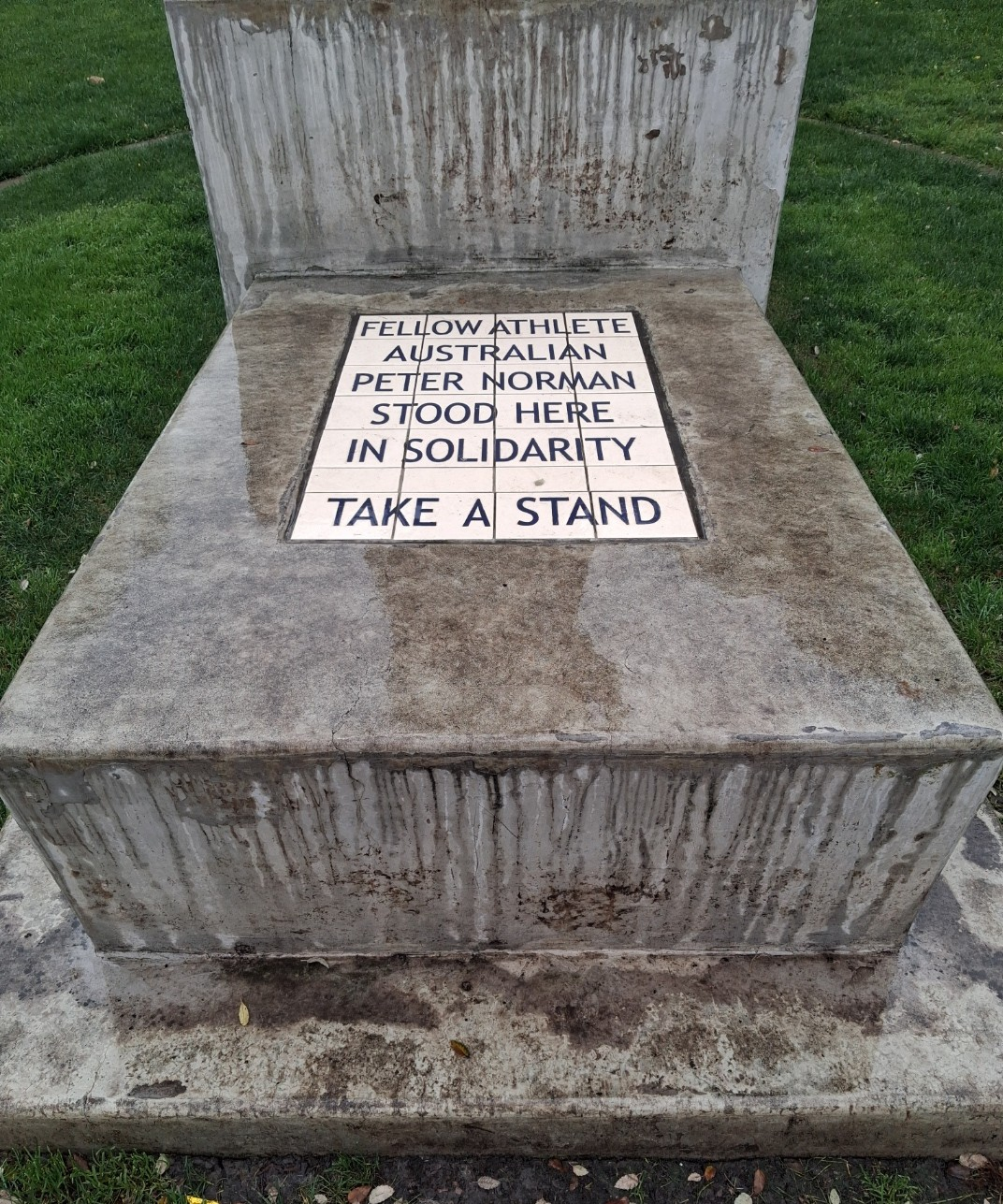
Peter Norman's plaque (2026)

Peter Norman asked to be excluded from the monument, so that visitors could participate by standing in his place, and feeling what he felt. Norman said, "Anybody can get up there and stand up for something they believe in. I guess that just about says it all". There is a plaque in the empty spot which reads "Fellow Athlete Australian Peter Norman Stood Here in Solidarity; Take a Stand".

== Use as protest space ==
Due to Victory Salute depicting an act of protest during the civil rights movement, as well as its proximity to San Jose City Hall (less than 0.3 miles away), the statue and its surrounding lawn have been focal points for protests in San Jose.

=== 2020 Black Lives Matter protests ===
On June 5, 2020, after the murder of George Floyd and the ensuing Black Lives Matter protests, a protest was held at Victory Salute with protestors raising their fists, mirroring the 1968 protest. On September 1 of that year, San Jose State student athletes organized a protest which started with the athletes giving speeches given at Victory Salute, followed by a march to the City Hall.

=== 2024 pro-Palestine protests and encampment ===
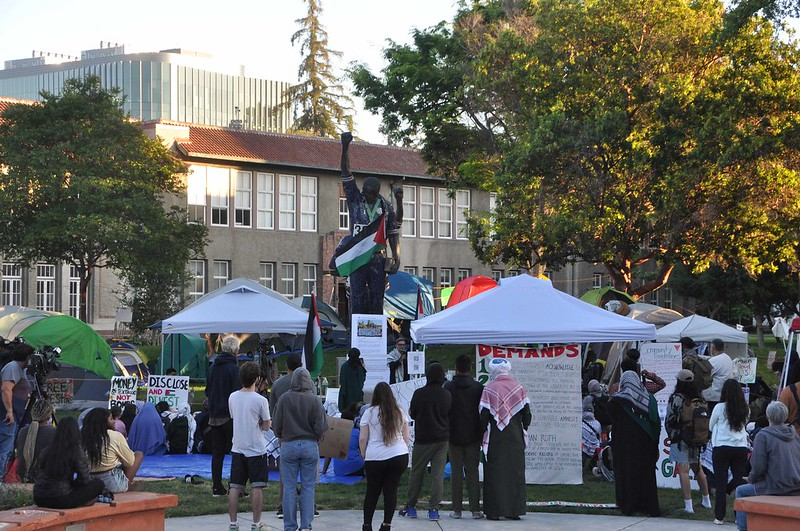
The 2024 pro-Palestine encampment surrounding Victory Salute at San Jose State University

On October 12, 2023, after the Hamas-led attack on Israel and subsequent Gaza war, the San Jose State University chapter of Students for Justice in Palestine organized a protest consisting of speeches given at Victory Salute, followed by a march around the campus.

In April 2024, following the campus occupation at Columbia University, student protestors began demanding that San Jose State divest from Israel over its genocide of Palestinians. The university's Associated Students board unanimously adopted a measure to boycott Silicon Valley companies involved in pro-Israeli activity on April 24.

Protests continued on campus, when on May 13, an encampment was established on the lawn around Victory Salute. One of the encampment's demands was the firing of history professor Johnathan Roth after a physical altercation between himself and a pro-Palestine protestor in February 2024. On May 14, the University communicated with the protestors about their demands but asserted that the encampment had to be disbanded before finals began on May 15. Additionally, the University released a statement cosigned by Victory Salute's subjects Tommie Smith, and John Carlos, as well as by activist Harry Edwards, and activist Ken Noel which expressed disapproval of the encampment around the statue. Victory Salute's artist, Rigo 23, released a statement supporting the encampment and gave a speech at the encampment.

On May 21, the protestors met with University President Cynthia Teniente-Matson and Interim Vice President for Student Affairs Mari Fuentes-Martin to discuss the protestors' demands. Teniente-Matson suggested the creation of a student advisory council composed of students from Middle Eastern student organizations that would work with faculty to address concerns about university partnerships with Israel. Following these talks, the encampment was dismantled on May 23.

== See also ==
- Arch of Dignity, Equality, and Justice
