= Hammer Theatre =

Performance venue in San Jose, California, operated by San Jose State University

Hammer Theatre Center
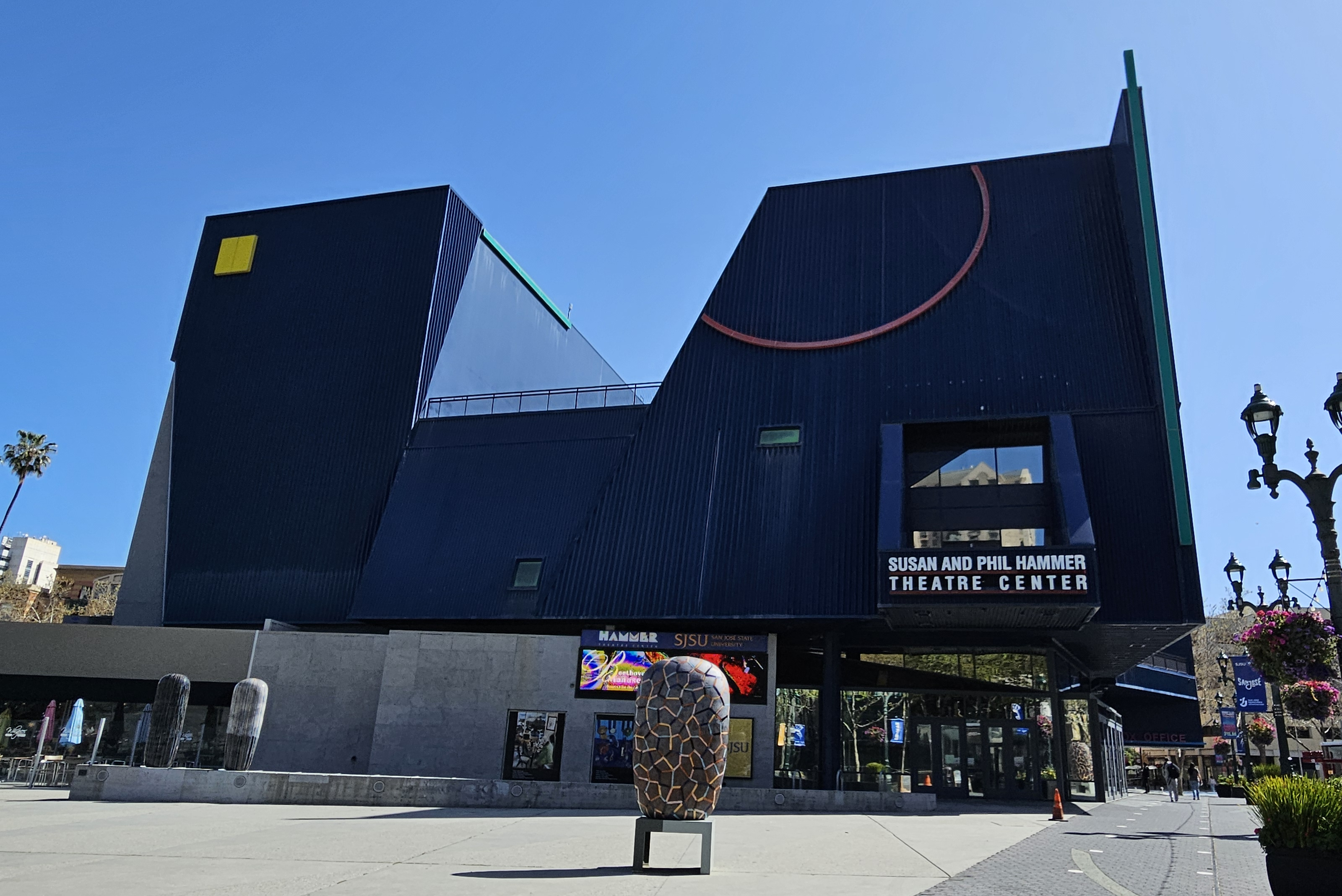
- The main entrance to the Hammer Theatre Center
- Interactive map of Hammer Theatre Center
- Former names: San Jose Repertory Theatre; (1997-2014)
- Address: 101 Paseo de San Antonio; San Jose, California; USA
- Location: Downtown San Jose
- Coordinates: 37.33375°N 121.88653°W
- Owner: City of San Jose
- Operator: San Jose State University
- Public transit: Paseo de San Antonio station

Construction
- Opened: 1997
- Reopened: March 2016

Website
- hammertheatre.com

The Susan and Phil Hammer Theatre Center (a.k.a. Hammer Theatre or Hammer Theatre Center) is a performance venue in Downtown San José. Located on the Paseo de San Antonio, the theatre is operated by San José State University.

== History ==
The Hammer Theatre Center began as a home for the San José Repertory Theatre Company, which was founded in 1980. The company became known during its early years as the fastest-growing professional theater company in the U.S. To have a theatrical home, the company collaborated with the San José Redevelopment Agency to build the Hammer Theatre in downtown San Jose. The Hammer Theatre, named after former mayor Susan Hammer and her husband, Phil Hammer, was completed in 1997.

In June 2014, the San José Repertory Company declared bankruptcy and the building that is now the Hammer Theatre Center was shuttered.

Efforts to reopen the venue resulted in a partnership between San José State University and the city of San José. The Hammer Theatre reopened in March 2016.

== Facilities ==
- Sobrato Auditorium, a theatrical auditorium space that seats up to 520.
- Hammer 4(sometimes stylized as Hammer4), a black box performance space that can fit up to 120 seats.
- Curtain Call Café, a ground floor space with a bar for special gatherings
- Mercury News Lounge, a second floor loungs with a bar for private parties.
- Rooftop Terrace attached to the Hammer4 studio
- Dressing rooms located in the basement for performers
- Bar/concessions area located near the front entrance in the lobby
- 2nd floor lobby, home to the Hammer2 Gallery that features a rotating display of artwork by San José State University alumni.
- Outside balconies

== Event types ==
The Hammer Theatre hosts the following seven categories of entertainment:

- SJSU@Hammer -- San Jose State University music, theater, dance and guest speaker events
- Lights & Action -- Live theater and off-Broadway theatrical productions
- Music w/o Borders -- Musical performances from around the world
- ArtTech -- Arts, technology and/or multi-media performances
- Hammer Speaks -- Educational lecture series, including National Geographic Live and the Sundance Film Institute
- Holidays@Hammer -- Holiday-related musical, theater and dance performances
- Dance -- Dance performances
