= Snell Putney =

- Born: February 27, 1929; Lincoln, Nebraska, United States
- Died: November 21, 2009 (aged 80)
- Education: University of Oregon
- Spouse: Gail Fullerton (div.)
- Scientific career
- Fields: Sociology
- Workplaces: San Jose State University

Snell "Mick" Putney (February 27, 1929 – November 21, 2009) was an American sociologist, environmentalist, and author. His books include The Adjusted American and The Conquest of Society. He was associated with many different environmental groups including the Last Stand, and the Key Deer Protection Alliance of which he was president at the time of his death.

== Biography ==
Putney was born in Lincoln, NE to Williams W. and Hazel Snell Putney. He received his B.A. and M.A. from the University of Nebraska before going on to receive his PhD in sociology from the University of Oregon. Unusually, the PhD, which was the very first awarded by the Oregon Sociology department, was awarded jointly to Putney and his wife Gail (née Jackson).

Putney taught at Drake University, Florida State University, Union Institute, and San Jose State University. For much of his adult life he lived between his sailboat, The Troika, and the off-grid solar home he and his second wife Alicia built on No Name Key.

Outside of his academic work, Putney was an avid environmentalist. At the time of his death, he was the president of the Key Deer Protection Alliance as well as the vice president of the Last Stand.

== Putney's thought ==
=== Individual neuroses ===
Putney is best known for his book, The Adjusted American, in which he attempts to describe the neurotic tendencies of the average American. Tendencies which are considered normal and even encouraged by the larger social structure. He sets out the theory that many of the social and personal ills of society are more or less based on the alienation of qualities from the self onto others or an other. Hate and love both appear as ways of alienating qualities that we feel we cannot express and then either despise (because we don't want to express these qualities) or love (because we wish we could). The implicit goal then is to break this constant alienation process so that one can take control over one's life, however, this is difficult because of how much this process of alienation is encouraged by social pressures to conform to a certain ideal image. In some ways, this is similar to Lacan's notions of Otherness and our relationship to it, however, Putney clearly retains the sense of a somewhat unified self though it is not clear what this "self" would be once freed from the various shackles of alienation placed upon it by the socially acceptable and desirable modes of subjectivity.

Strong affect appears as a clear sign of the libidinal investment in the act of alienation so that, for instance, the expression of fascination and anger against those people who are easy to hate (white supremacists for example) shows how important that other is as a vehicle for the alienation of all those repugnant qualities and desires we fear in ourselves. The trauma of the end of a relationship can be similarly seen as an expression of the fear that a part of the self has been lost forever, that part that we projected on the beloved.

Going beyond projection and alienation is seen as the ultimate goal. Achieving the ability to directly fulfill what he terms "self needs" and provide total self acceptance for the individual appears as the way towards self-actualization. If this can happen, then free and candid association with others can occur producing relationships of reciprocity towards greater self-development as opposed to what he sees as superficial relations of mutual admiration. In this sense, Putney was certainly a humanist and can be likened to Erich Fromm inasmuch as freedom is a central term that must be dealt with positively instead of negatively through attempts at its denial via alienation processes that move responsibility for our lives away from ourselves.

== Bibliography ==
=== Books ===
- Snell Putney and Gail J Putney. Adjusted American: Normal Neurosis in the Individual and Society. Joanna Cotler Books, 2nd Revised edition, 1973. First Edition published 1964 under title Normal Neurosis.
- Snell Putney. The Conquest of Society. Wadsworth, 1972.

=== Papers ===
- Snell Putney and Gladys J. Putney (sic). Origins of the Reformatory. The Journal of Criminal Law, Criminology, and Police Science. Vol. 53, No. 4 (December 1962), pp. 437–445.
- Snell Putney and Gladys J. Putney (sic). Origins of the Reformatory. The Journal of Criminal Law, Criminology, and Police Science. Vol. 53, No. 4 (December 1962), pp. 437–445.
- Russell Middleton and Snell Putney. Political Beliefs. Pages 134-140 in Selected Readings for Introductory Sociology, edited by Charles H. Ainsworth. MSS Information Corp, 1972.
- Snell Putney and Russell Middleton. Some Factors Associated with Student Acceptance or Rejection of War. American Sociological Review, XXVII (October 1962), page 666.
