= Arch of Dignity, Equality, and Justice =

Art installation at San Jose State University, United States

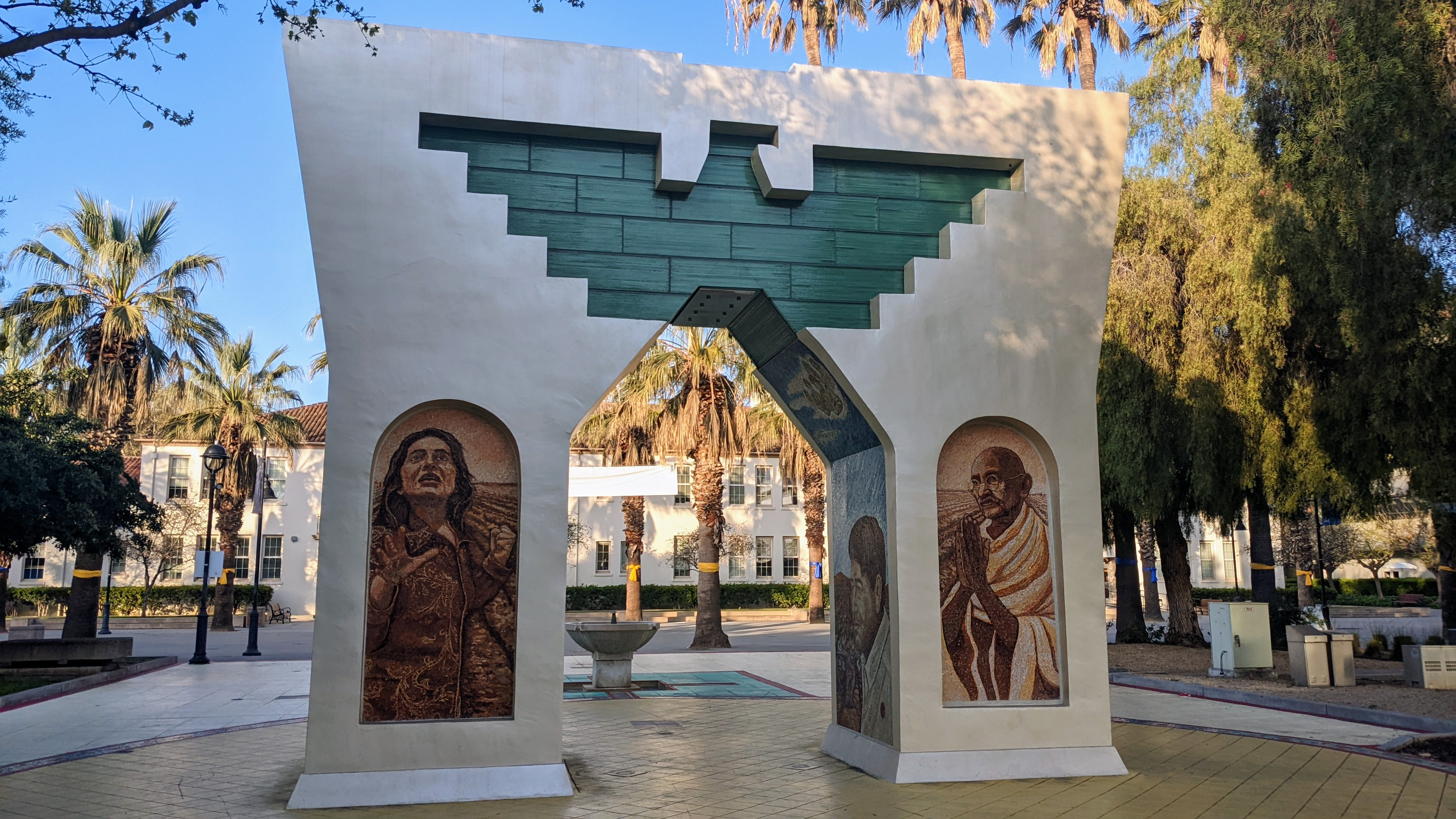
- Artist: Judy Baca
- Year: 2008
- Medium: Mosaic
- Movement: Chicana art
- Subject: César Chávez, Dolores Huerta, Mahatma Gandhi, Robert Kennedy, two unnamed farmworkers
- Dimensions: 760 cm (25 ft)
- Location: San Jose, California, U.S.; 37.335822°N 121.881358°W
- Owner: San Jose State University

The Arch of Dignity, Equality, and Justice, commonly referred to as the César Chávez Arch, is an art installation and monument consisting of a pearlescent plaster arch in the style of a Mayan corbelled arch and includes five Venetian tile mosaics. It was created by American artist Judy Baca, and is installed along the Paseo de César Chávez on the San Jose State University campus, in San Jose, California, United States. The four front-facing mosaics feature portraits of Dolores Huerta, Mahatma Gandhi, and two unnamed farmworkers, while the mosaic on the underside of the arch features Cesar Chavez encountering Robert Kennedy.

The top of the arch is adorned with a stacked glass eagle in the style of the United Farm Workers well-known logo. Richard Chavez, César Chávez's brother, originally designed the black Aztec eagle insignia that became the symbol of the National Farm Workers Association and the UFW.

In 2022, San Jose State students and faculty embedded the Arch of Dignity, Equality, and Justice into their Public Art as Resistance project.

== Response to 2026 sexual abuse allegations ==
In March 2026, The New York Times published an investigation alleging that Chávez had sexually abused women and girls over the course of decades, including UFW co-founder Dolores Huerta, who is also depicted on the arch. SJSU president Cynthia Teniente-Matson announced that the university would initiate a campuswide engagement process, including dialogues and a teach-in, to determine appropriate next steps for the arch, the adjacent Paseo de César Chávez, and other campus spaces bearing Chávez's name or likeness. Teniente-Matson stated that the university's Art Collection Committee would be consulted, calling the situation "a painful reckoning, but...a necessary one."

== See also ==
- Chicana art
- Great Wall of Los Angeles
- Victory Salute
- List of monuments and memorials to Cesar Chavez
