= Twohy Building =

- U.S. National Register of Historic Places
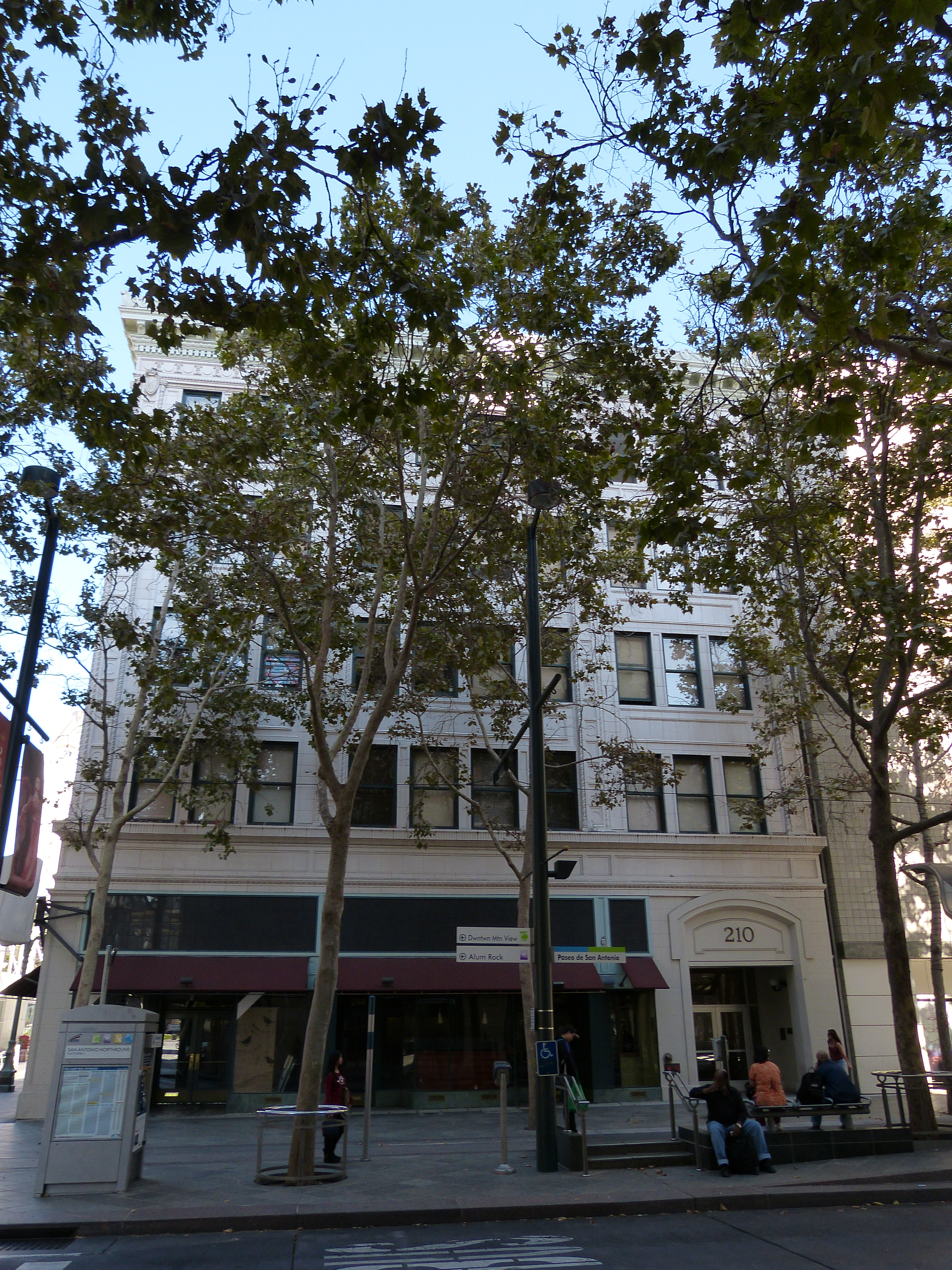
- The building in 2010

- Location within California
- Location: 210 South First Street, San Jose, California
- Coordinates: 37°19′59″N 121°53′12″W
- Area: less than one acre
- Built: 1917
- Architect: William Binder
- Architectural style: Classical Revival
- NRHP reference No.: 03000989
- Added to NRHP: October 6, 2003

The Twohy Building is a historic building in San Jose, California, located on the Paseo de San Antonio in Downtown San Jose. It was built in 1917 for Judge John W. Twohy, the founder of the Twohy Brothers Construction Company. The company focused on "design and heavy/civil construction of railroads, bridges, tunnels, and public works projects, as well as manufacturing railroad cars, World War I "Victory" ships, and ownership of railroads. In 1906, the Twohy family relocated to San Jose to construct the nearby Bayshore Cut-Off for Southern Pacific and supervise repairs to railroad bridges damaged by the San Francisco earthquake" For example, it built part of the Southern Pacific Railroad.

The building was designed by architect William Binder in the Classical Revival architectural style. It has been listed on the National Register of Historic Places since October 6, 2003. It was built as a commercial building, with professional offices above a large ground floor drug store."Construction of the Twohy Building helped establish South 1st as the center of the business community in San Jose."
