= Diaz Compean Student Union =

Student building in San Jose, California

Coordinates: 37°20′11″N 121°52′51″W

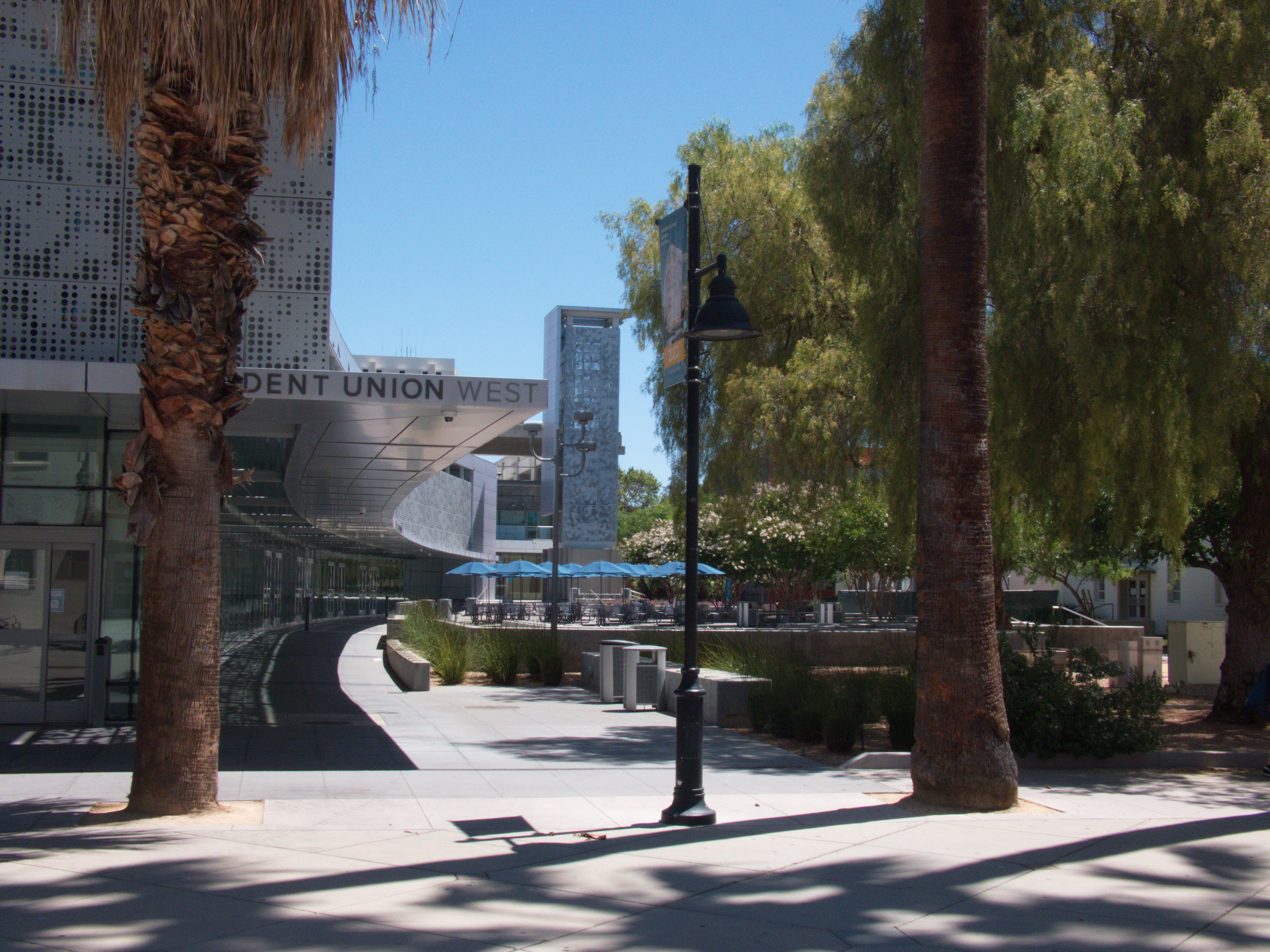
- Interactive map of the Diaz Compean Student Union area

General information
- Type: Student Center
- Location: Paseo de César Chávez, San Jose, California
- Year built: 1963-1969
- Opened: October 13, 1969
- Renovated: 2010-2016
- Owner: San Jose State University
- Governing body: Associated Student of San Jose State University

Technical details
- Floor count: 3
- Floor area: 246,000 sq ft

Design and construction
- Architecture firm: Ernest J. Kump and Associates

Renovating team
- Renovating firm: Perkins&Will

Website
- https://www.sjsu.edu/studentunion/student-union/index.php

The Diaz Compean Student Union (officially the Ramiro Compean and Lupe Diaz Compean Student Union) is a student center along the Paseo de César Chávez on the campus of San Jose State University, in San Jose, California. Completed in 1969 and renovated in 2016, it functions as an event center, a place for student engagement, and a place intended to improve student experience.

== History and architecture ==
Talks of constructing a union building at San Jose State University began in 1927, when in 1936 the school took full ownership over the Main Carnegie library from the City of San Jose, and repurposed it into its Student Union. However, as the university's enrollment continued to climb, the Carnegie Library was demolished order to make room for an expansion of the university's library in 1960.

Following the Carnegie Library's demolition, the Associated Students of San Jose State University drafted a ballot measure in November 1963 to construct a new student union for the school. The measure created a $5.5 million-dollar bond (equivalent to $58,000,000 in 2025), which would be paid back through an annual student fee of $20. The measure drew in a record 9,134 ballots, with support of the student union surpassing the required 2/3rds majority needed. In October 1964, the architectural contract for the building was awarded to Ernst J. Kump and Associates, which they completed in 1969. The union was a 144,000 square foot structure and was built in a brutalist style, with heavy use of exposed concrete and brick.

To celebrate the opening of the Student Union, a Grateful Dead concert was held in the ballroom on October 31, 1969.

=== Room names ===
After construction was completed in 1969, students got to choose the names of the meeting rooms of the student union, and opted to name them after respect for the Native American and Hispanic heritage of much of their student body. Initial room names included Umunhum, Guadalupe, Pacheco, Loma Prieta, Costanoan, Diablo, Almaden, Laguna Seca, Pacifica, Madrone, Manzanita, and Verde. The only room that was not named in this style was the ballroom, which was named the Ron Barrett Ballroom, after a long-time director of the union. After the Student Union was renovated in 2016, the meeting rooms and ballroom lost their names, instead being referred to as numbers (Meeting Rooms 1A, 1B, 2A, etc.).

=== Renovation ===
In 2010, the university launched an $89 million renovation (equivalent to $131,000,000 in 2025) of the Student Union, finding that the space available no longer sufficiently met the needs of students due to increasing enrollment. Architectural firm Perkins&Will was chosen to complete the project, and added one wing to either end of the building which increased the floor area by 104,000 square feet. In order to contrast the original building's brutalist style, the wings were built in a modernist style, with a heavy use of glass. After the construction, the building was LEED-Gold certified.

In 2016, ahead of the opening of the new wings, it was announced that philanthropist Lupe Diaz Compean donated $15 million to establish scholarships and pay for operation of the building. For this, the university renamed the building to the Ramiro Compean and Lupe Diaz Compean Student Union.

== Activities and event spaces ==
The Diaz Compean Student Union houses a variety of spaces to hold activities and events.

The basement-level floor holds a bowling and billiards center, a cafe, and a 312-person capacity theater.

The ground-level floor holds the Union Square food court, the Spartan Bookstore, and the welcome center. It also houses various offices for student resources, including those for Veterans, Black, Chicanx, Pacific Islander, and LGBTQ students.

The upper-level floor holds 10 meeting rooms, administrative offices, a print-shop, and the 756-person capacity ballroom.

== Gallery ==
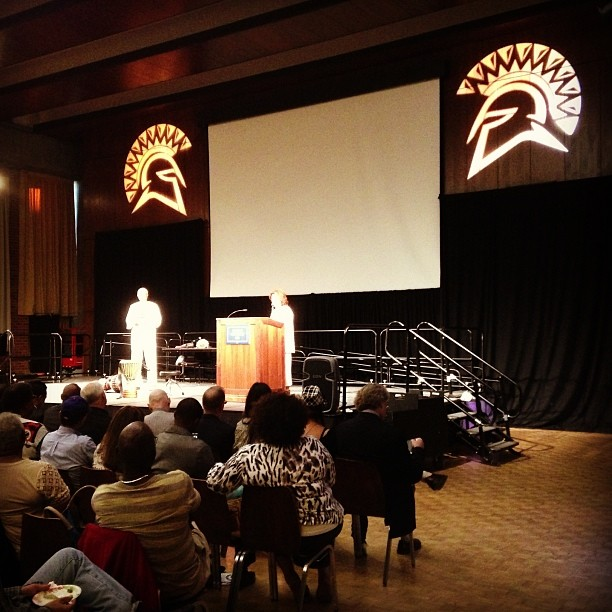
The Ron Barrett Ballroom, which was removed after renovations in 2016.

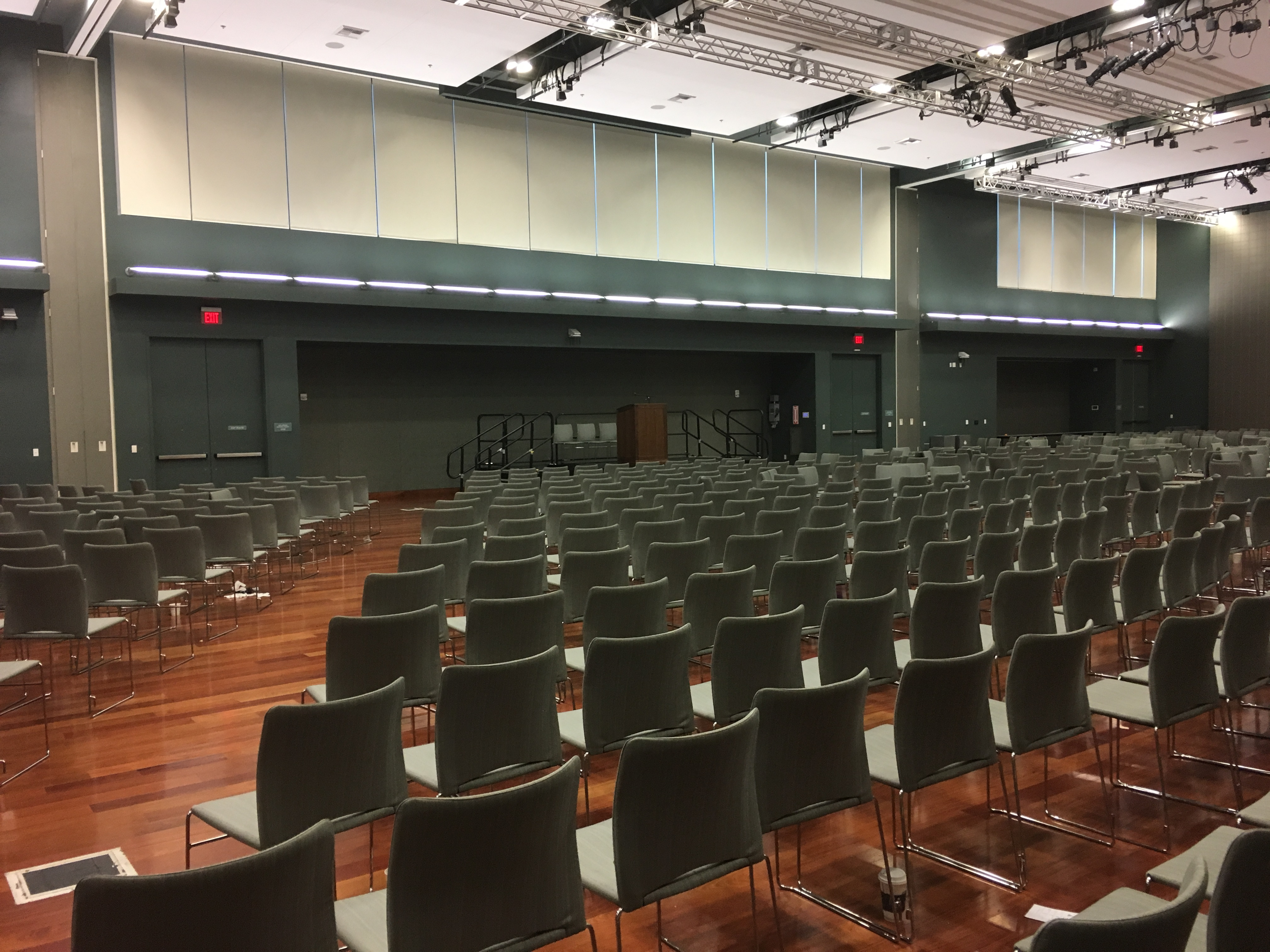
The current ballroom.

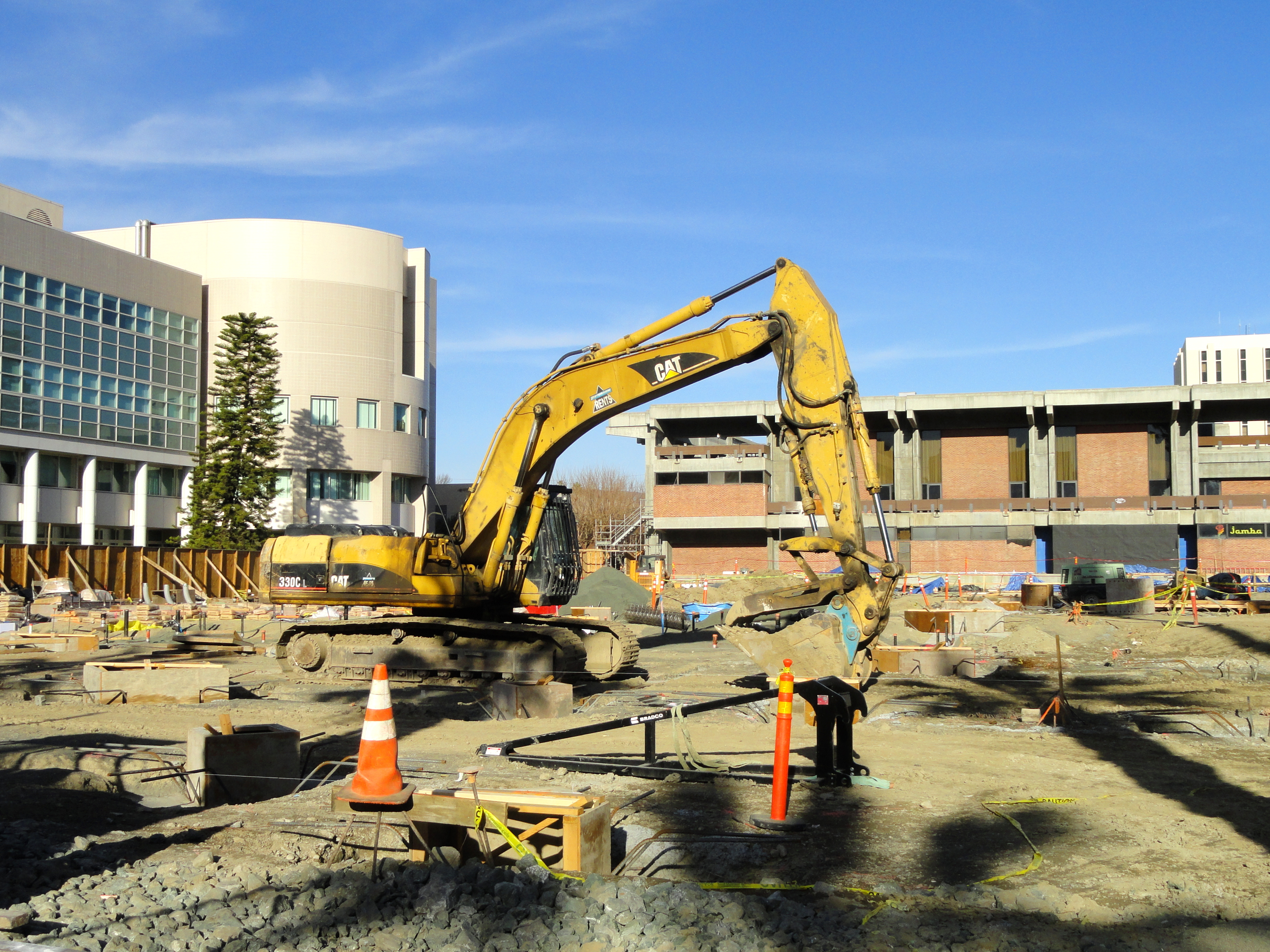
The Student Union as it was undergoing renovations in 2016, the original exterior of the building can be seen in the back right.

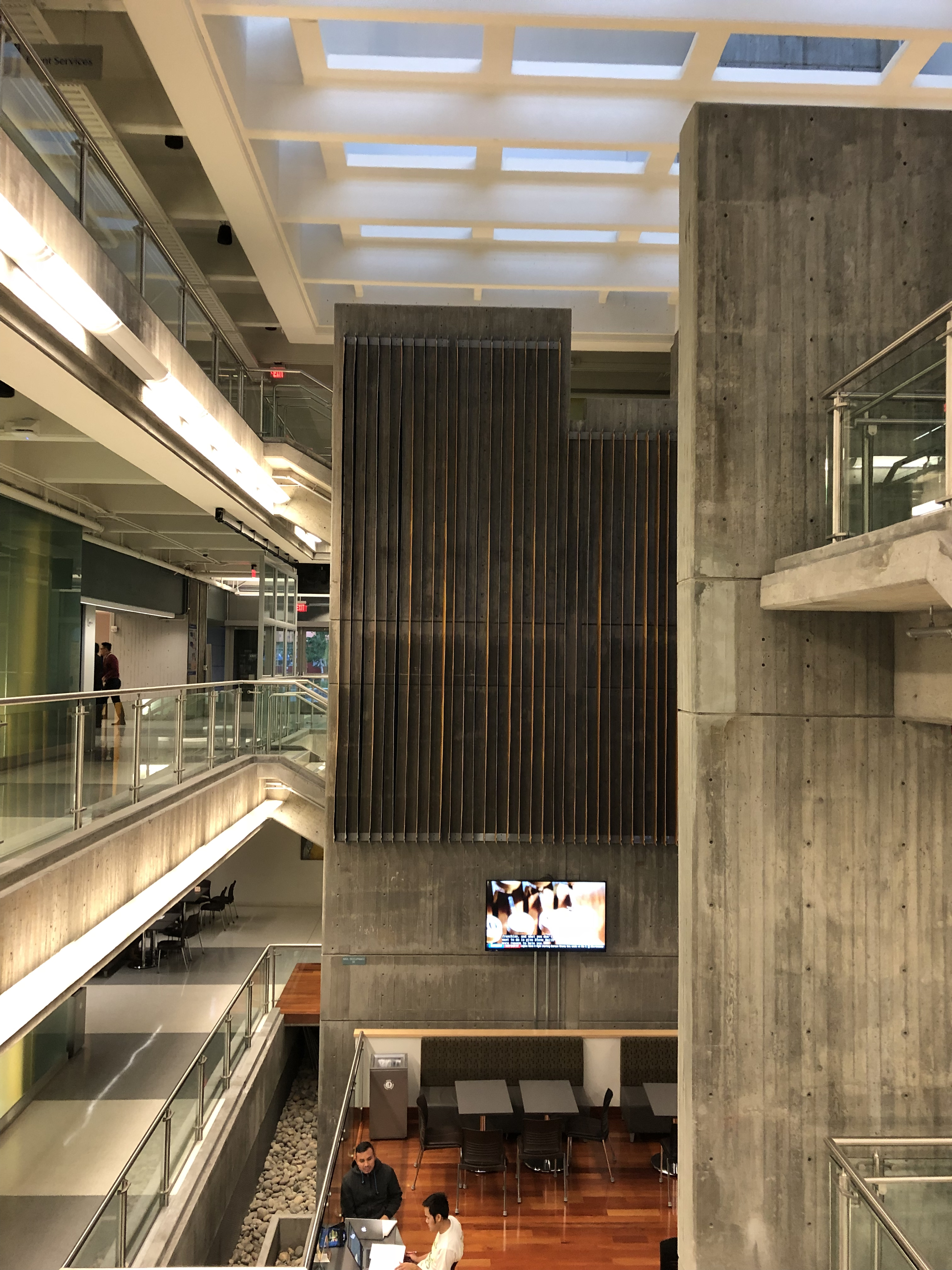
The interior atrium, which spans all three floors.

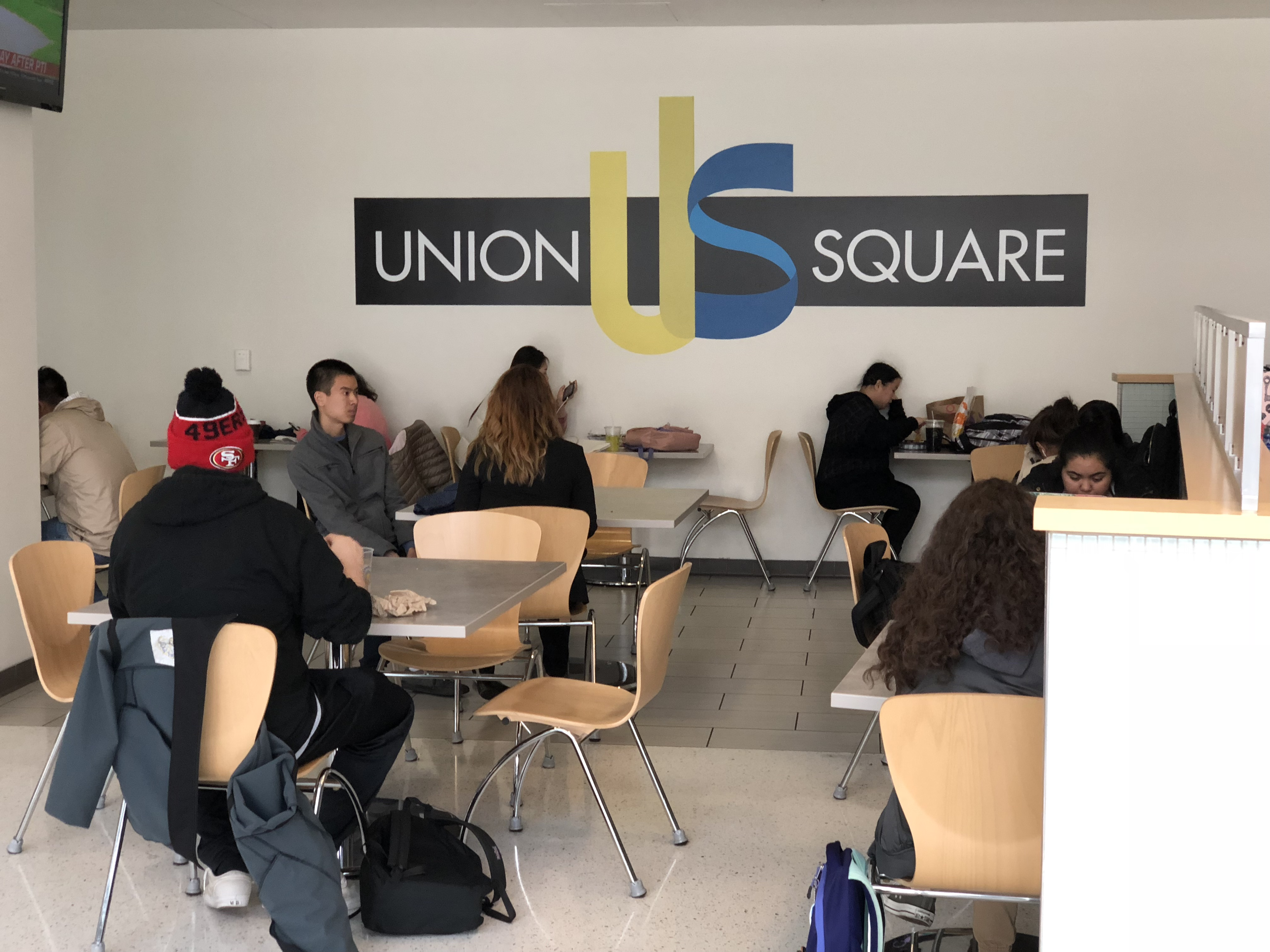
The Union Square food court.
