= John H. Bunzel =

American academic

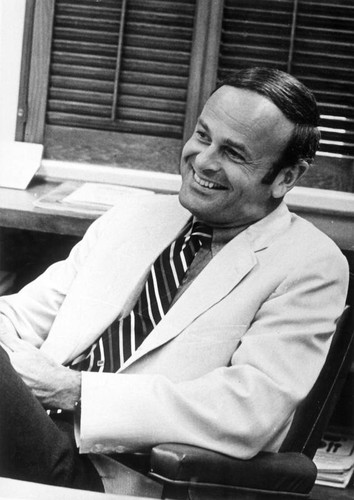

20th President of San José State University
- In office 1970–1978
- Preceded by: Hobert W. Burns
- Succeeded by: Gail Fullerton

Personal details
- Born: April 15, 1924 New York City, New York, U.S.
- Died: July 19, 2018 (aged 94) Mount Pleasant, North Carolina, U.S.
- Party: Democratic
- Education: Princeton University (BA); Columbia University (MA); University of California, Berkeley (PhD)
- Profession: Academic

John Harvey Bunzel was an American academic. He served as president of San Jose State University from 1970 to 1978 and was a senior research fellow at the Hoover Institution since 1978. He was formerly a member of the United States Commission on Civil Rights.

== Early life and education ==
Bunzel graduated from Kent School in 1942, an AB in political science from Princeton University, an MA in sociology from Columbia University, and a PhD in political science from the University of California, Berkeley. He served in the United States Army 1943–1946.

== Activism at Princeton ==
Upon returning from the Army in 1946, Bunzel helped found the Princeton Liberal Union and was its first president. (Note: Subsequent leadership of the Liberal Union (Rafner ’51) commented that the willingness to take on Princeton’s long history of racism was in part due to the age and military experience of students such as Bunzel.) An unaffiliated student organization active from 1946 to 1951, the Liberal Union adopted a platform that embraced several progressive positions but foremost among them was opposition to racial and religious discrimination, a cause which they actively and effectively pursued within Princeton itself. Fulfilling Bunzel's goal, in the fall of 1949 the Liberal Union worked with NAACP president Walter White to send recruitment letters to over 500 historically black high schools (Note: The Daily Princetonian notes the 500 figure; research by a Princeton archivist/researcher notes it as over 2000 high schools.) encouraging students to apply to Princeton, after which three were accepted.

John Bunzel ’46, whose education had been interrupted by his service in World War II, returned to campus in 1946 to finish his final two years of college. He later said his time in the Army had sparked a passion for civil rights. He led Princeton University students who shared Broderick’s commitments to form the Liberal Union in 1946 and served as its president until his graduation in 1948.

== San Jose State University Presidency ==
From 1970 to 1978, Bunzel was the president of San Jose State University. During his administration, he appointed a greater number of women to prominent administrative positions than any other California State University. His initiatives included expanding the Moss Landing Marine Laboratories, and opening the Steinbeck Center and Nuclear Science Facility. Additionally, under his leadership, programs in Religious Studies, Jewish Studies, and Women's Studies were established.
