= Paseo de San Antonio =

Paseo in San Jose

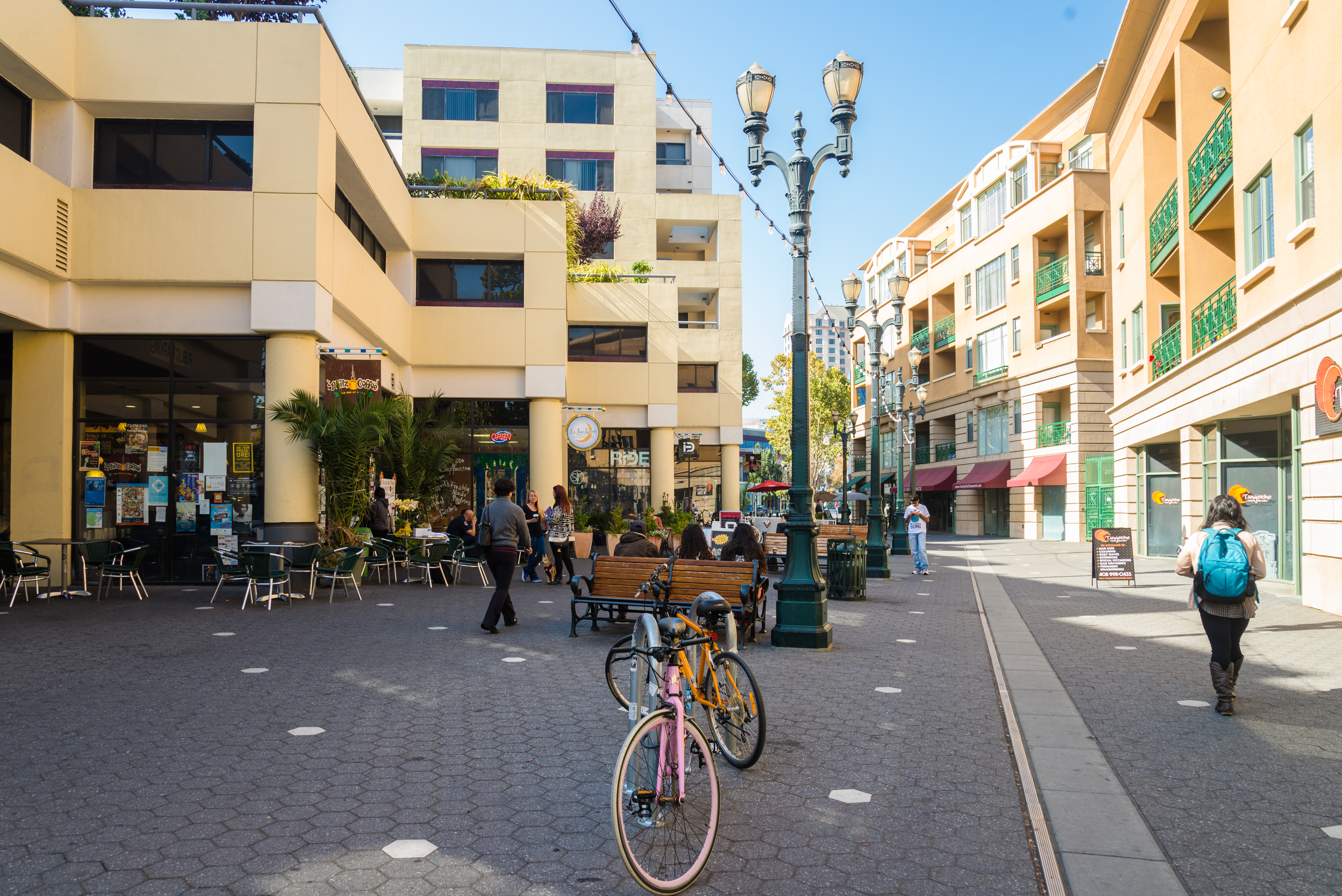
- Interactive map of Paseo de San Antonio
- Type: Pedestrian paseo
- Length: 0.3 mi (0.48 km)
- Location: Downtown, San Jose, California
- Coordinates: 37.33316°N 121.887581°W

The Paseo de San Antonio is a pedestrian paseo in Downtown San Jose, spanning from Plaza de César Chávez in the west to San Jose State University's campus in the east.

== History ==
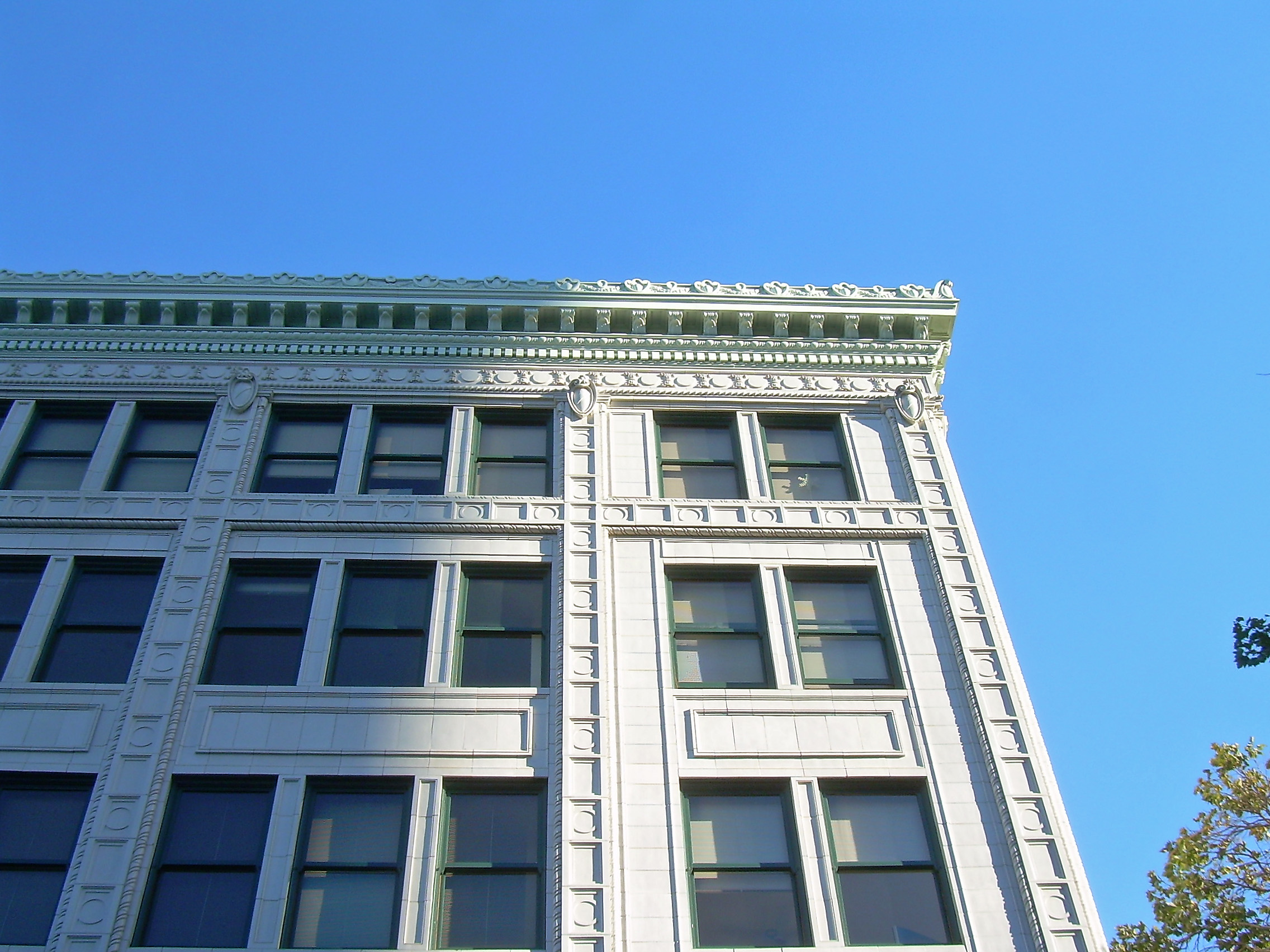
The historic Twohy Building.

The paseo was developed in 1988 by the San José Redevelopment Agency, with the pedestrianization of San Antonio Street eastwards from Plaza de César Chávez.

Paseo de San Antonio was laid out to serve as a pedestrian axis through central Downtown. It has since become one of the most-utilized pedestrian spaces in Downtown, as a focal point for dining, events, and theatres.

== Location ==
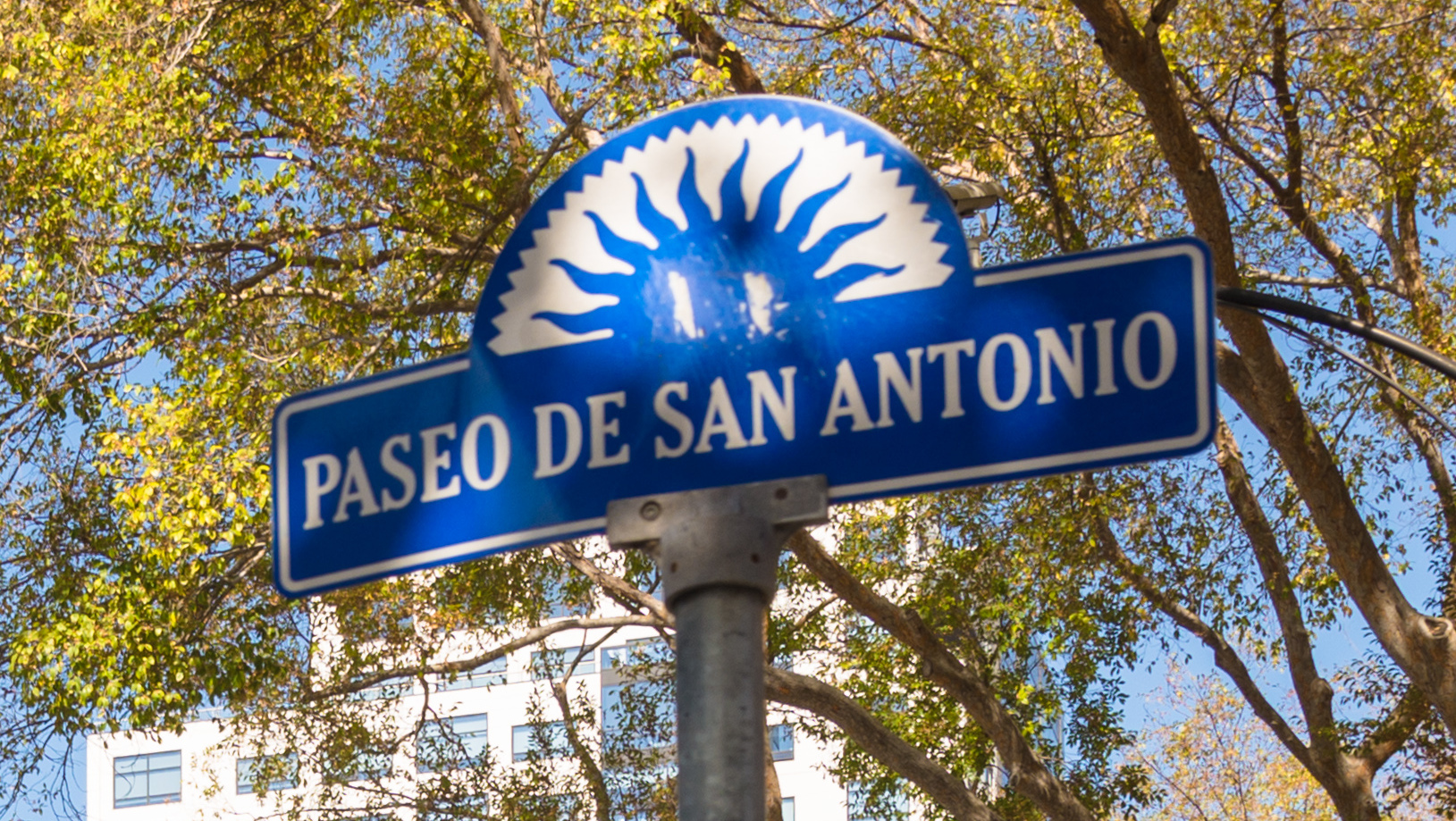
Paseo de San Antonio signage.

Paseo de San Antonio is located in central Downtown San Jose. It spans from Plaza de César Chávez in the west to the Swenson Gate entrance to San Jose State University's campus in the east.

While the western portion of the paseo follows the former alignment of San Antonio Street, the paseo turns diagonally towards the southeast past 2nd Street.

The Paseo de San Antonio station, on the VTA light rail, is located where the paseo meets 1st Street.

== Landmarks ==
- Hammer Theatre
- Fairmont San Jose
- Twohy Building

== See also ==
- Paseo de San Carlos
- Paseo de César Chávez
- 9th Street Paseo
