= Charles W. Davidson College of Engineering =

College under San Jose State University

Coordinates: 37.337100°N 121.881576°W

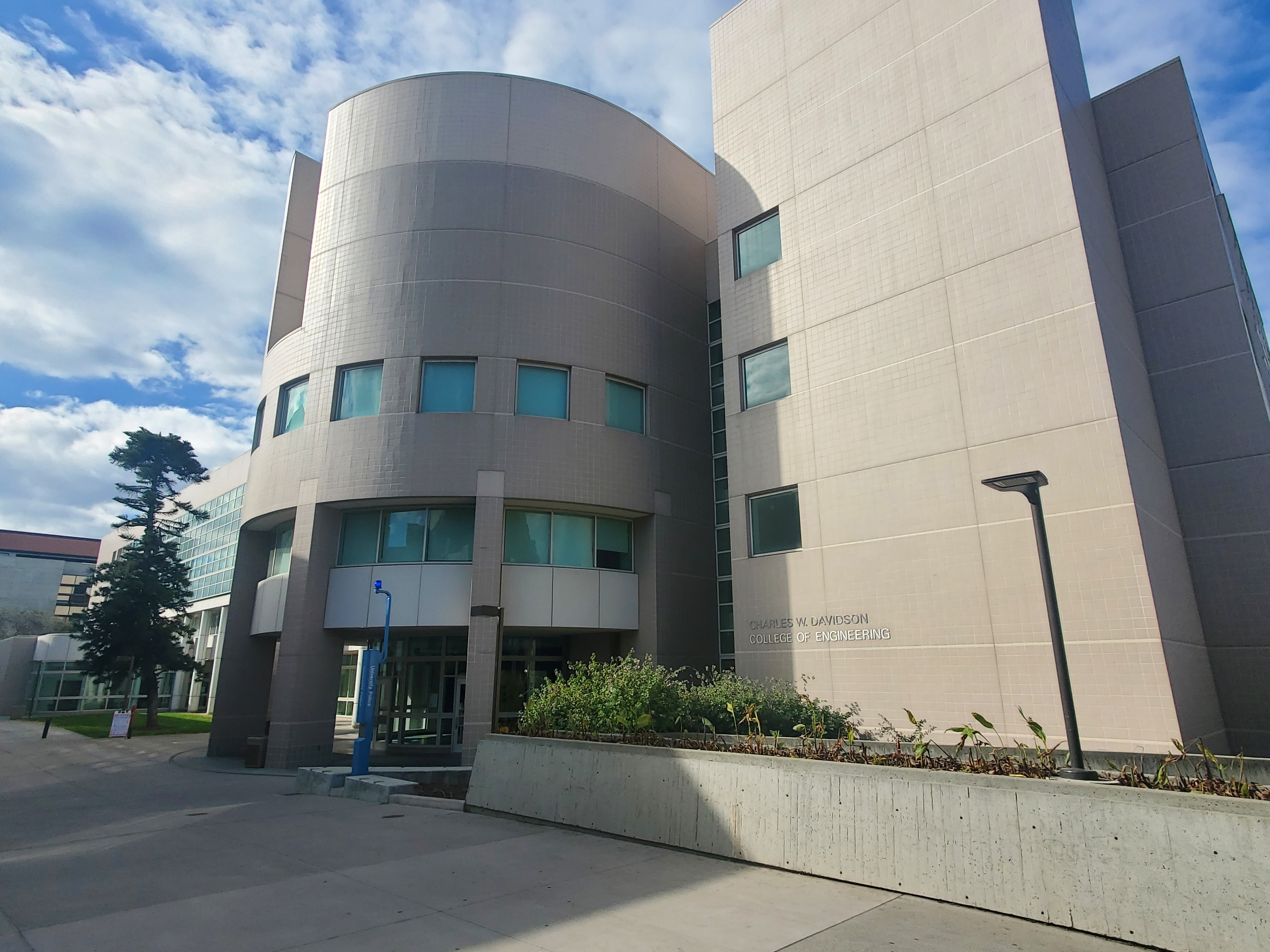
- Established: 1945
- Parent institution: San Jose State University
- Dean: Sheryl Ehrman
- Academic staff: 390 (Spring 2023)
- Students: 7,125 (Spring 2023)
- Undergraduates: 4,837(Spring 2023)
- Postgraduates: 2,288(Spring 2023)
- Location: San Jose, California, United States
- Campus: urban
- Website: https://engineering.sjsu.edu/

The Charles W. Davidson College of Engineering is one of the seven colleges under San Jose State University (SJSU) in downtown San Jose, California, United States. This college is located on the northeastern side of the main campus, which is in the heart of the Silicon Valley. The vast majority of their resources are located in a four-story building known as the "Engineering Building". The college is named after Charles W. Davidson, who donated US$15 million to the formerly known SJSU College of Engineering. Charles W. Davidson was a civil engineer for the City of San Jose and a real estate broker for companies he founded, such as DKD Property Management and L&D Construction.

== Rankings ==
- According to Business Insider in 2012, the Charles W. Davidson College of Engineering is among the top 50 best Engineering schools in the world.
- During 2013, the Silicon Valley Business Journal under the American City Business Journals ranks the Charles W. Davidson College of Engineering No. 1 in Silicon Valley's First Choice for new Engineering hires.
- U.S. News & World Report has ranked the college in the top 10 public engineering programs for the 12th consecutive year in 2022.
- According to Niche, the Charles W. Davidson College of Engineering is No. 311 in the nation and No. 27 in California.
- SJSU's computer engineering program is ranked 1st in the nation among public university engineering programs offering bachelor's and master's degrees and 2nd nationally among all public and private colleges that do not offer doctoral degrees, according to U.S. News & World Report's 2015 college rankings.

== Academics ==
ABET Programs
Program	Founded
Aerospace engineering	1989
Biomedical engineering	2014
Chemical engineering	1966
Civil engineering	1959
Computer engineering	1989
Computer science	1994
Electrical engineering	1959
Industrial engineering	1963
Materials science	1962
Mechanical engineering	1963
Software engineering	2016

The Charles W. Davidson College of Engineering provides fourteen undergraduate majors, seventeen Master's degrees, ten academic minors, and six academic certificates from thirteen engineering disciplines.

San Jose State offers a double degree program in computer engineering where one earns a bachelor's (B.S.) and master's (M.S.) degree in five years. Students in this program are allowed to take graduate classes, complete only one project for graduation, and have guaranteed admission to the graduate program per completion of requirements.

== Admissions ==
Undergraduate admission statistics
	Fall 2025	Fall 2024	Fall 2023	Fall 2022	Fall 2021
First-time Freshmen
Applicants	8,213	7,286	6,457	5,833	5,473
Admits	5,989	5,688	4,754	4,197	4,806
Admit rate	73%	78%	74%	72%	88%
Enrolled	1,007	866	835	726	994
Yield rate	17%	15%	18%	17%	21%
Transfers
Applicants	1,947	1,495	1,426	1,426	1,785
Admits	1,349	1,102	1,147	1,060	1,440
Admit rate	69%	74%	80%	74%	81%
Enrolled	588	415	435	416	552
Yield rate	44%	38%	38%	39%	38%

The Charles W. Davidson College of Engineering generally has the same requirements as the whole university. San Jose State is objective for most applicants, where it primarily decides applicants based on GPA, SAT/ACT, and the rigor of classes taken during one's secondary school. State residency and graduating from a high school in the Santa Clara County are factors as well. Applicants who pose unique, personal circumstances may be given a different outlook on their application if and only if they apply to the Educational Opportunity Program at San Jose State. This college will weigh the SAT/ACT Math score more than the other sections during the admissions process.

== Facilities ==
Main facilities include:

- Engineering Computing Center
- Central Machine Shop
- Industrial Studies Building
- Engineering Building
