= Paseo de César Chávez =

Pedestrian paseo

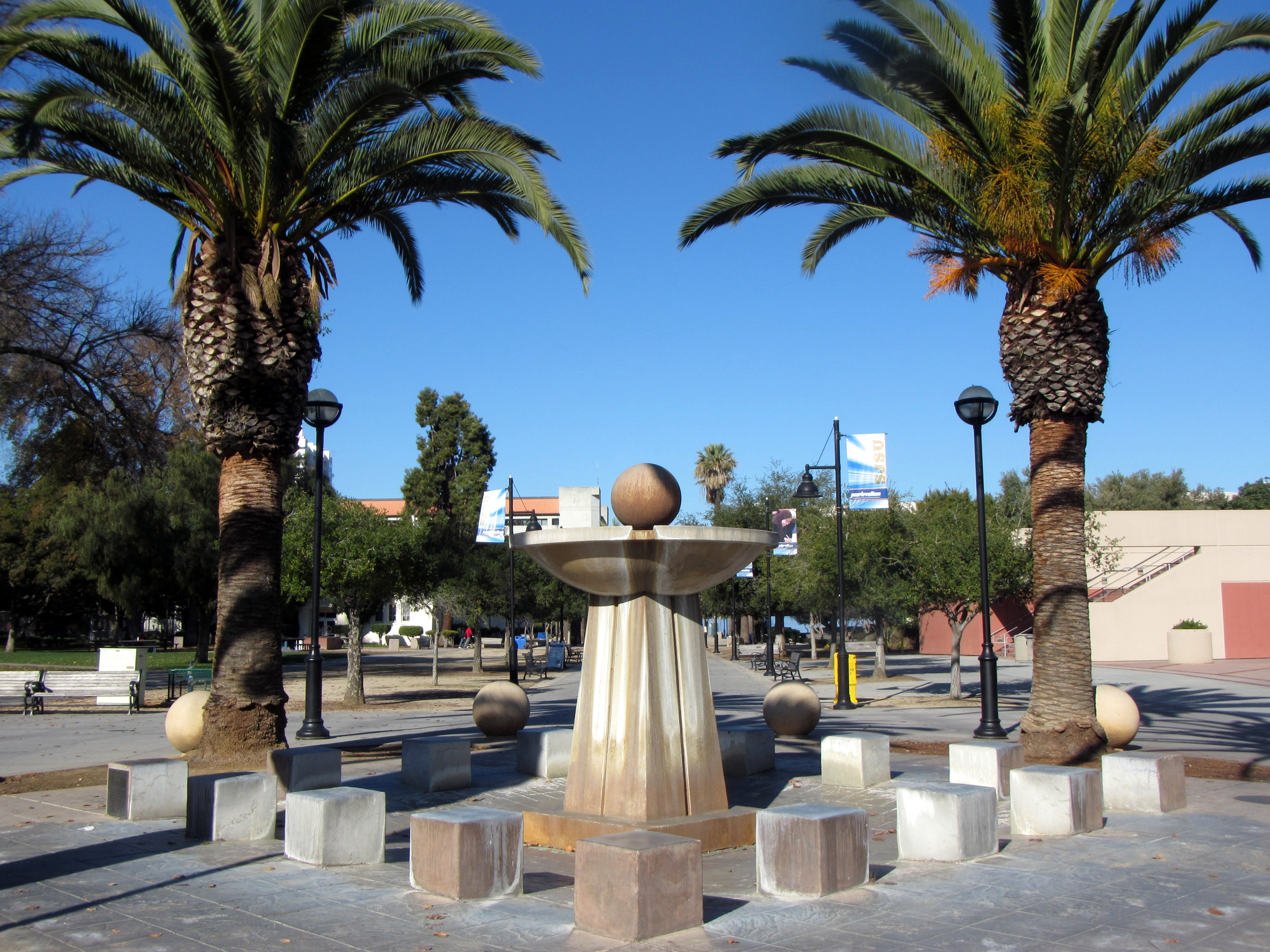
- Interactive map of Paseo de César Chávez
- Part of: San Jose State University
- Namesake: César Chávez
- Type: Pedestrian paseo
- Length: 0.2 mi (0.32 km)
- Location: San Jose State University, San Jose, California
- Coordinates: 37.3357°N 121.8815°W

Construction
- Commissioned: 1993
- Construction start: 1994
- Completion: 1996

The Paseo de César Chávez is a pedestrian paseo in Downtown San Jose, spanning across San Jose State University's campus.

== History ==
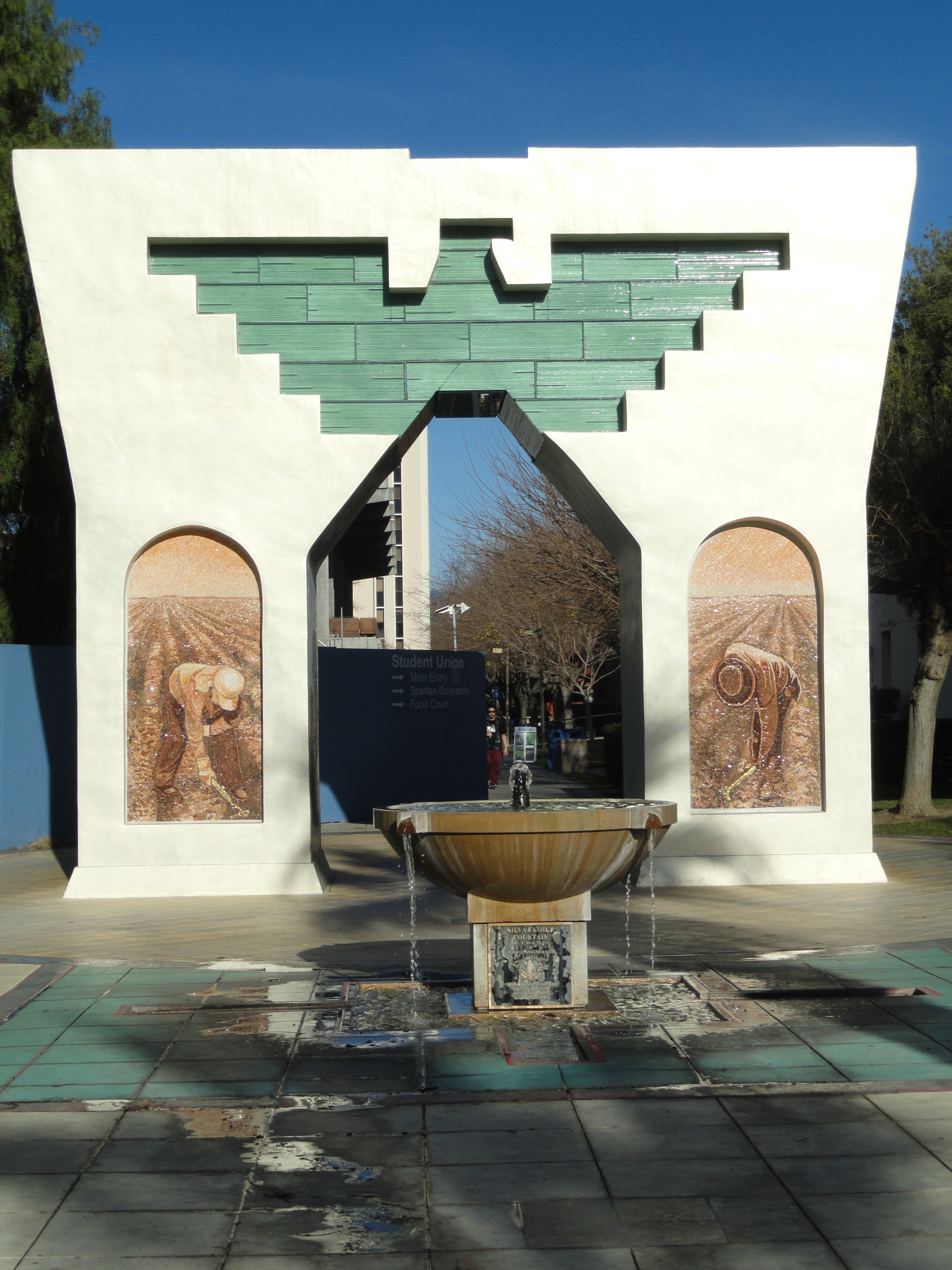
Arch of Dignity, Equality, and Justice, 2008 by Judy Baca

Paseo de César Chávez was developed from 1994–1996 by San Jose State University, along with the Paseo de San Carlos and the 9th Street Paseo, as a part of a major campus revitalization plan. The paseo was created by the pedestrianization of San Carlos Street between 4th and 10th Streets. It was named in honor of the famed California civil rights activist César Chávez.

Paseo de César Chávez was laid out to serve as the primary north-south pedestrian axis through San Jose State University's campus. Because of the Diaz Compean Student Union, it has become an important focal point for events and gatherings on the SJSU campus.

In 2008, the Arch of Dignity, Equality, and Justice, a memorial by Judy Baca to César Chávez, the namesake of the paseo, was unveiled by Dolores Huerta, noted California civil rights activist and contemporary of Chávez.

== Location ==
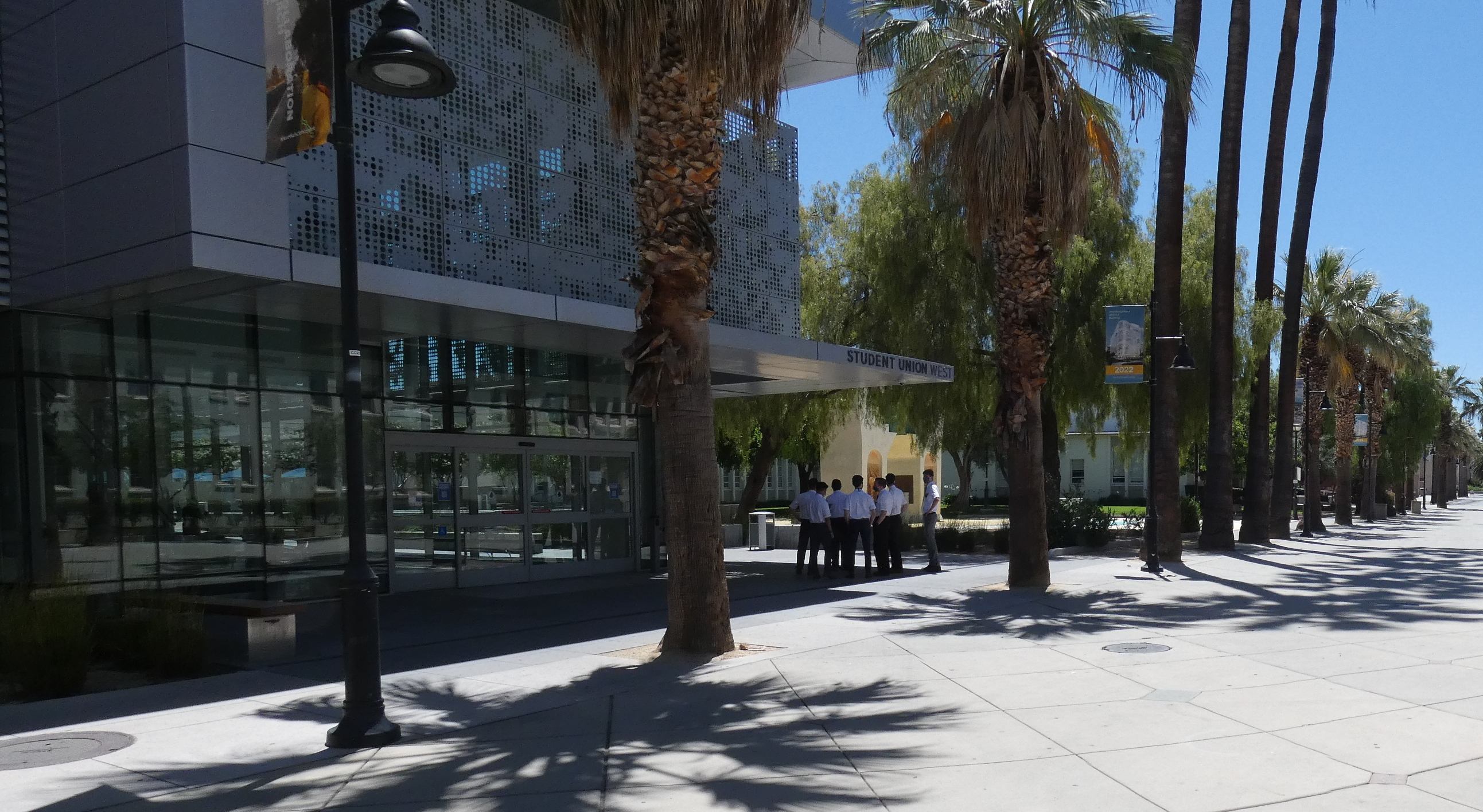
Diaz Compean Student Union

Paseo de César Chávez is located in central Downtown San Jose. spanning across San Jose State University's campus from San Salvador Street in the south to San Fernando Street in the north. It follows the former alignment of 7th Street

The paseo intersects the Paseo de San Carlos, the main east-west axis on campus.

It is within walking distance of Paseo de San Antonio station and Santa Clara Street station, on the VTA light rail.

== See also ==
- Paseo de San Antonio
- Paseo de San Carlos
