= Paseo de San Carlos =

Pedestrian paseo

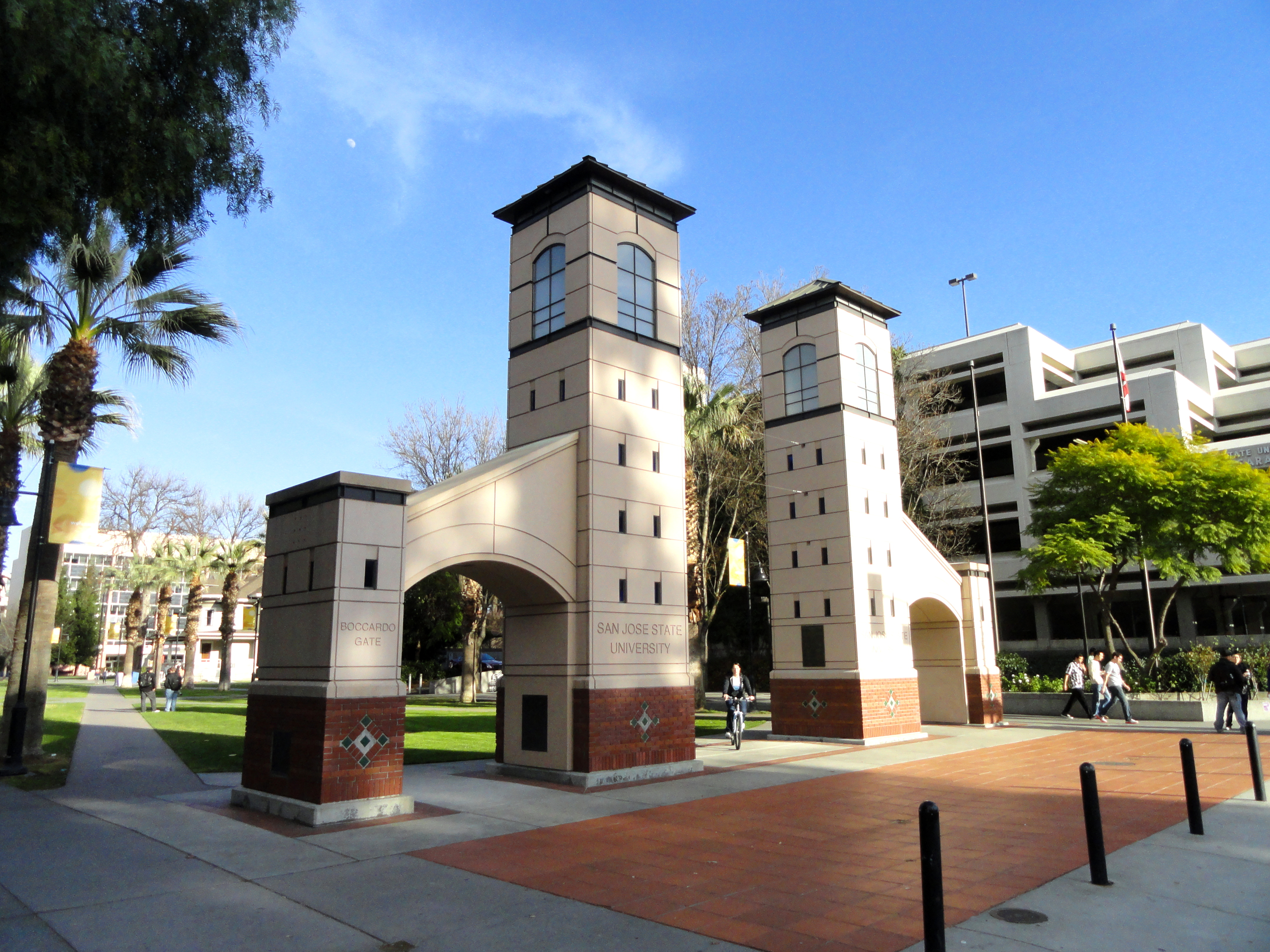
- Interactive map of Paseo de San Carlos
- Part of: San Jose State University
- Type: Pedestrian paseo
- Length: 0.4 mi (0.64 km)
- Location: San Jose State University, San Jose, California
- Coordinates: 37.3334°N 121.8833°W

Construction
- Commissioned: 1993
- Construction start: 1994
- Completion: 1996

The Paseo de San Carlos is a pedestrian paseo in Downtown San Jose, California, spanning across San Jose State University's campus.

== History ==
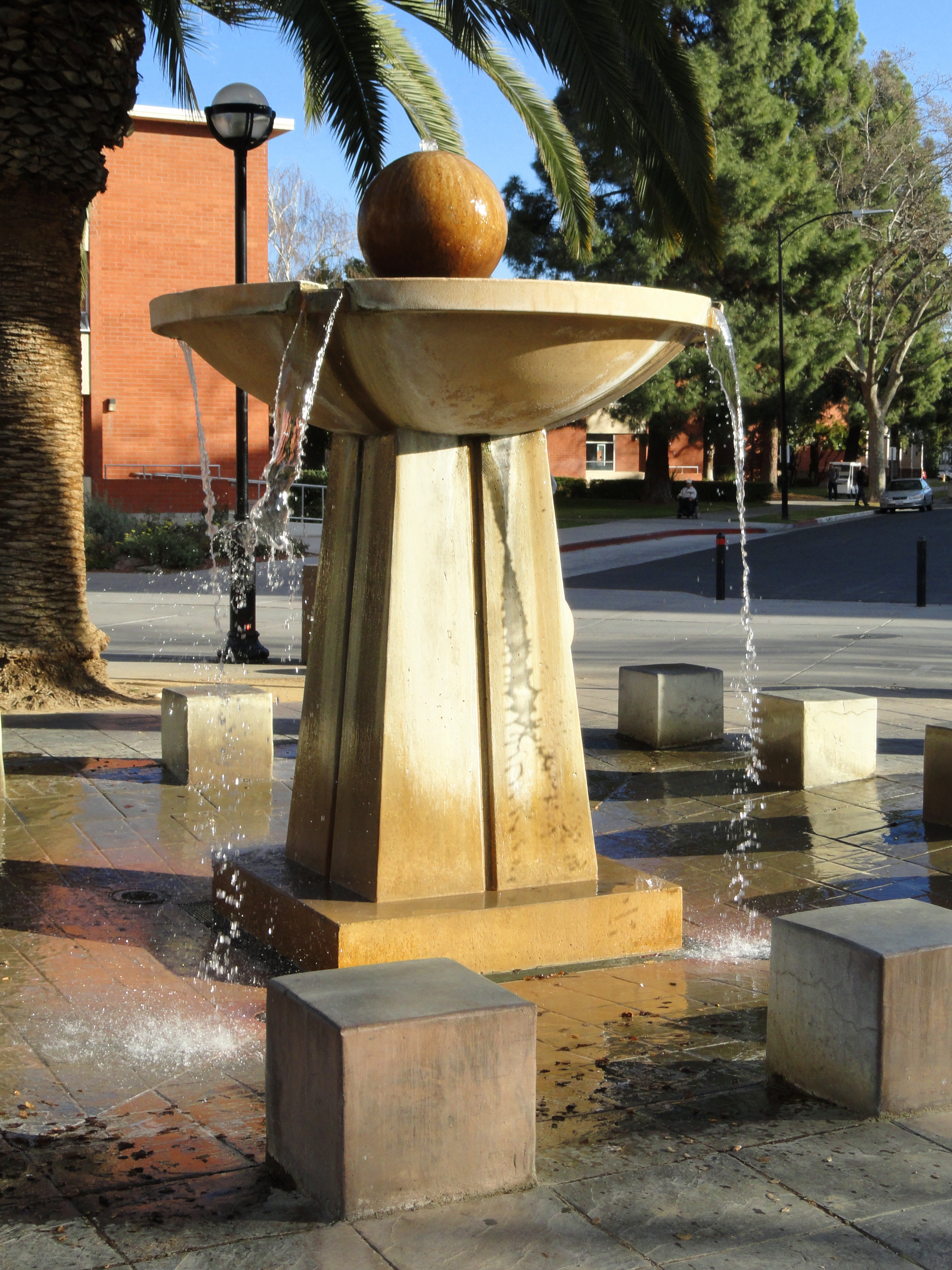
Chávez Fountain marks the intersection of the Paseo de San Carlos and the Paseo de César Chávez.

Paseo de San Carlos was developed from 1994 to 1996 by San Jose State University, along with the Paseo de César Chávez and the 9th Street Paseo, as a part of a major campus revitalization scheme. The paseo was created by the pedestrianization of San Carlos Street between 4th and 10th Streets.

Paseo de San Carlos was laid out to serve as the primary east–west pedestrian axis through San Jose State University's campus, connecting the university to Downtown and connecting Downtown, west of SJSU, to the Naglee Park neighborhood, east of SJSU.

In 2019, the historic Scheller House, home of the SJSU Associated Students organization, was relocated from its historic location on the Paseo de San Carlos to the northeast corner of campus, to make way for the new sciences building.

== Location ==
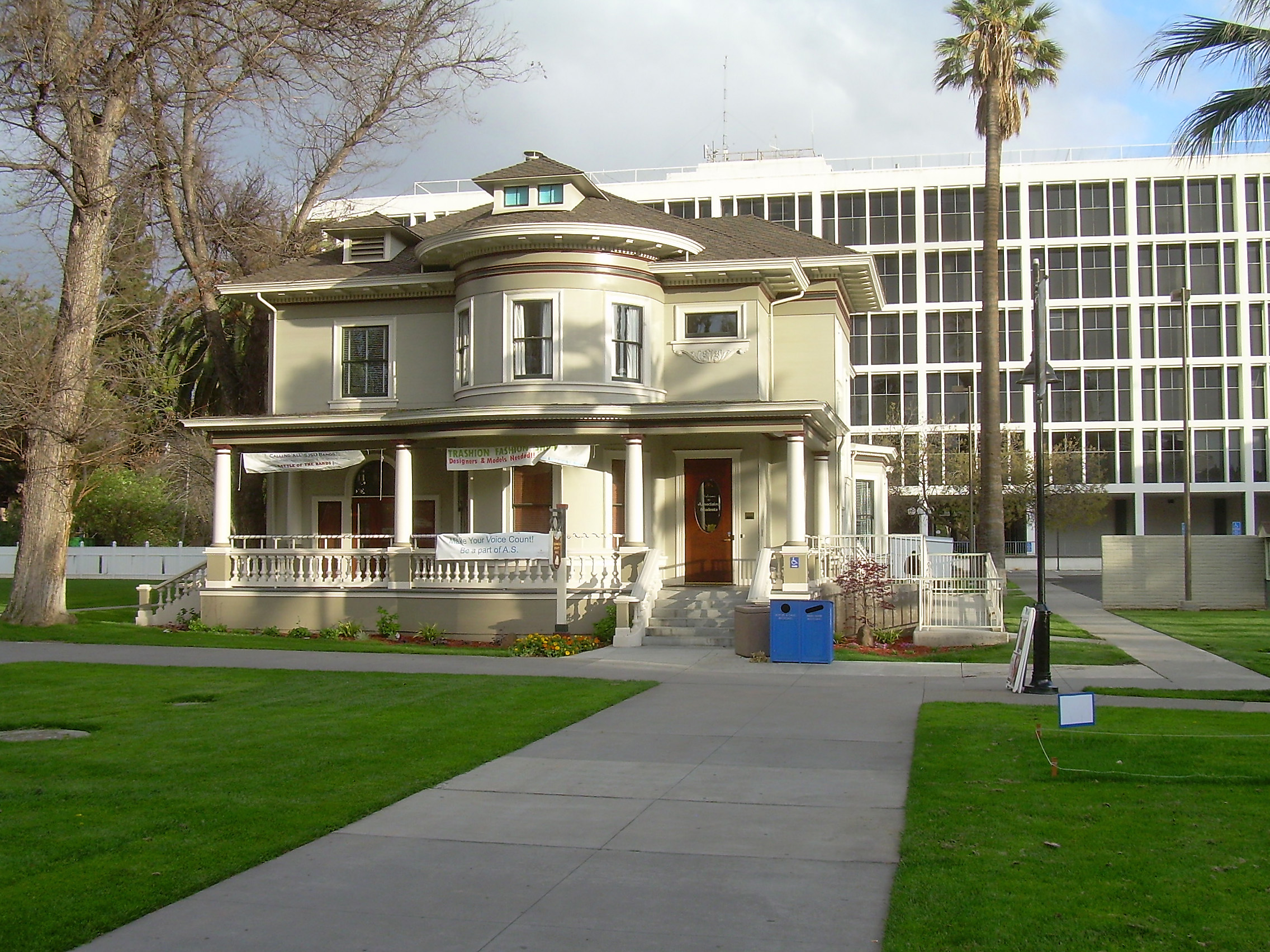
The Scheller House at its former location on the Paseo de San Carlos, prior to its move in 2019.

Paseo de San Carlos is located in central Downtown San Jose. It spans across San Jose State University's campus, from the Boccardo Gate in the west to the Lucas Gate in the east. The paseo follows the former alignment of San Carlos Street, between 4th Street and 10th Street.

The paseo intersects the Paseo de César Chávez, the main north–south axis on campus.

The paseo is within walking distance of Paseo de San Antonio station and Convention Center station, on the VTA light rail.

== See also ==
- Paseo de San Antonio
- Paseo de César Chávez
- 9th Street Paseo
